= Elisabeth Haub School of Law =

Private school in White Plains, New York

Coordinates: 41.040253°N 73.764685°W

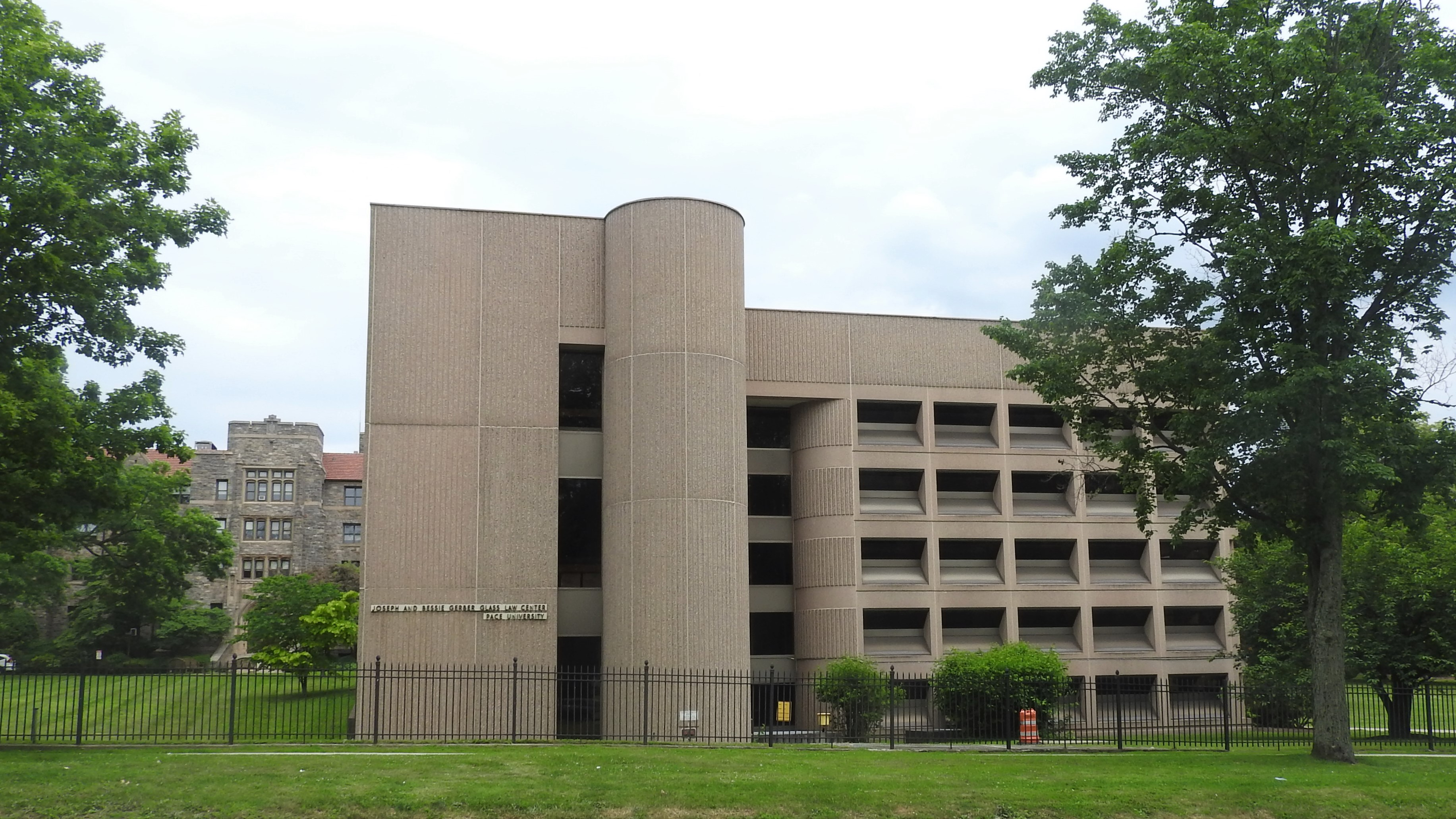
- Motto: Opportunitas (Latin for Opportunity)
- Parent school: Pace University
- Established: 1976; 50 years ago
- School type: Private law school
- Dean: Horace Anderson Jr.
- Location: White Plains, New York, U.S.
- Enrollment: 830
- Faculty: 36 (full-time), 109 (adjunct)
- USNWR ranking: 142nd (tie) (2026)
- Bar pass rate: 68.55% (2024 first-time takers)
- Website: Official website

The Elisabeth Haub School of Law is the law school at Pace University in White Plains, New York. Originally founded in 1976 as Pace Law School, it was renamed in 2016 for Elisabeth Haub (in recognition of Haub's environmental advocacy and philanthropy). The American Bar Association (ABA) accredited it in 1978, and its campus is home to the New York State Judicial Institute, which serves as a statewide center for the education, training, and research facility for all judges and justices of the New York State Unified Court System.

== Overview ==
=== Admissions ===
For the classes starting in 2024, 52% of applicants were accepted by the law school, 28.6% of those accepted enrolled, and the enrolled students had a median 153 LSAT score and a 3.5 undergraduate GPA.

=== Clinics and Centers ===
John Jay Legal Services, Inc. is a not-for-profit legal services firm that houses and runs the clinic and externship programs at the Elisabeth Haub School of Law, including the Amelia A. Gould Representation in Mediation Clinic, Barbara C. Salken Criminal Justice Clinic, Environmental Litigation Clinic, Equal Justice America Disability Rights Clinic, Fairbridge Investor Rights Clinic, Food and Farm Business Law Clinic, and Immigration Justice Clinic. Additionally, the school operates several nationally renowned centers and institutes including the Pace Energy and Climate Center, Land Use Law Center, and Women's Justice Center.

=== Joint programs ===
The law school has several joint degree programs which require additional applications for admission. This option includes dual degrees with four masters programs in the Yale School of the Environment (Master of Environmental Management, Master of Environmental Science, Master of Forestry, and Master of Forest Science), and an M.S. in Environmental Policy at Bard College.

=== 2026 Rankings ===
U.S. News & World Report ranked the Elisabeth Haub School of Law at #142 (tie). Trial Advocacy tied at #21, Dispute Resolution tied at #36, and International Law tied at #56.

U.S. News & World Report also ranked The Elisabeth Haub School of Law #1 in Environmental law, followed by Lewis & Clark Law School (#2 tie)/UC Berkeley School of Law (#2 tie), UCLA School of Law (#4), and Harvard Law School (#5 tie)/Vermont Law School (#5 tie), in the top five for environmental law programs. The Lexinter Law Directory ranked the Haub Environmental Law program #2 out of the "16 Best Environmental Law Schools," alongside New York University School of Law (#1), Harvard Law School (#3), Yale Law School (#4), and Columbia Law School (#5). Above the Law (website) summarized the top five environmental law programs that received an A+ from the "National Jurist’s preLaw magazine" in alphabetical order as: Georgetown University Law Center, George Washington University Law School, Harvard Law School, Lewis & Clark Law School, and (Elizabeth Haub School of Law), Pace University.

== Post-graduation ==
=== Bar passage rate ===
In 2024, the law school had a 68.55% pass rate for first-time takers, while 78.22% passed a bar examination within two years of graduation. In 2024, 71.01% first time takers passed from the jurisdiction of New York, 54.55% from New Jersey, and 57.89% passed from 6 remaining jurisdictions.

=== Employment ===
According to the law school's official 2024 ABA-required disclosures, after graduation 75.4% of the Class of 2023 obtained full-time, long-term, JD-required employment (i.e., as attorneys) and 9.27% obtained JD-advantage employment. Most employment was in 1–10 attorney firms or in government, and no graduates obtained federal clerkships. The graduate Under-Employment Score as calculated by Law School Transparency is 9.7%, indicating the percentage of the Class of 2023 unemployed, pursuing an additional degree, or working in a non-professional, short-term, or part-time job nine months after graduation.

== See also ==
- Environmental law in the United States
