= 2025 New York City Civil Court elections =

New York City judicial election

Various elections to the New York City Civil Court took place on November 4, 2025, in New York City. Primary elections will be held on June 24, 2025. Justices are either elected from districts or county-wide.

== Bar Association evaluation ==
The New York City Bar Association rates judicial candidates as approved or disapproved in both primary and general elections.

=== Primary election ===
Election	Candidate	Rating
Brooklyn at-large	Marisa Arrabito	Approved
Brooklyn at-large	Janice Chen	Approved
Brooklyn at-large	Susan Liebman	Not Approved
Brooklyn at-large	Janice P. Purvis	Approved
Queens at-large	John J. Ciafone	Not Approved
Queens at-large	Sheridan C. Chu	Approved
Queens 1st district	Juliette-Noor Haji	Approved
Queens 1st district	Thomas G. Wright-Fernandez	Not Approved
Queens 2nd district	Eve Cho Guillergan	Approved
Queens 2nd district	Julie M. Milner	Not Approved
Bronx at-large	Shekera Anessa Algarin	Approved
Bronx at-large	George M. Santana	Not Approved

== Brooklyn ==
=== At-large (2 seats, special) ===
==== Democratic primary ====
===== Candidates =====
====== Nominees ======
- Marisa Arrabito, law clerk
- Janice Chen, court attorney

====== Eliminated in primary ======
- Susan Liebman, law clerk
- Janice Purvis, court attorney referee

==== Results ====

Chen

20–30%
30–40%
40–50%
50–60%
60–70%

Arrabito

20–30%
30–40%
40–50%
50–60%
60–70%
80–90%

Purvis

20–30%
30–40%
40–50%
60–70%

Liebman

20–30%
30–40%
40–50%
50–60%
60–70%

Other

20–30% tie
30–40% tie
40–50% tie
50% tie
No votes

Chen

<20%
20–30%
30–40%
40–50%
50–60%
60–70%

Other

No votes

Arrabito

<20%
20–30%
30–40%
40–50%
50–60%
60–70%
80–90%

Other

No votes

Purvis

<20%
20–30%
30–40%
40–50%
50–60%
60–70%

Other

No votes

Liebman

<20%
20–30%
30–40%
40–50%
50–60%
60–70%

Other

No votes

Democratic primary (vote for 2)
Party	Candidate	Votes	%
Democratic	Janice Chen	143,199	34.50
Democratic	Marisa Arrabito	107,709	25.95
Democratic	Janice P. Purvis	81,322	19.59
Democratic	Susan Liebman	79,686	19.20
Write-in		3,104	0.75
Total votes		415,020	100.00

==== General election ====
===== Results =====
2025 New York City Civil Court Brooklyn at-large special election (vote for up to 2)
Party	Candidate	Votes	%
Democratic	Janice Chen	425,252	52.06
Democratic	Marisa Arrabito	382,719	46.85
Write-in		8,902	1.09
Total votes		816,873	100.00

=== 2nd district (special) ===
==== Democratic primary ====
===== Candidates =====
====== Nominee ======
- Sheridan Jack-Browne

==== General election ====
===== Results =====
2025 New York City Civil Court Brooklyn district 2 special election
Party	Candidate	Votes	%
Democratic	Sheridan Jack-Browne	51,962	99.60
Write-in		211	0.40
Total votes		52,173	100.00

=== 4th district (special) ===
==== Democratic committee selection ====
===== Nominee =====
- Chidi Eze

==== General election ====
===== Results =====
2025 New York City Civil Court Brooklyn district 4 special election
Party	Candidate	Votes	%
Democratic	Chidi A. Eze		
Write-in			
Total votes			100.00

=== 6th district (special) ===
==== Democratic committee selection ====
===== Nominee =====
- Juliet Howard

==== General election ====
===== Results =====
2025 New York City Civil Court Brooklyn district 6 special election
Party	Candidate	Votes	%
Democratic	Juliet Howard		
Write-in			
Total votes			100.00

=== 7th district (special) ===
==== Democratic primary ====
===== Candidates =====
====== Nominee ======
- Duane Frankson

==== Democratic committee selection ====
===== Nominee =====
- Dagmar Plaza-Gonzalez

==== General election ====
===== Results =====
2025 New York City Civil Court Brooklyn district 7 special election (vote for up to 2)
Party	Candidate	Votes	%
Democratic	Duane Frankson		
Democratic	Dagmar Plaza-Gonzalez		
Write-in			
Total votes			100.00

== Manhattan ==
=== 3rd district (special) ===
==== Democratic nominee ====
- Eric Wursthorn

==== General election ====
===== Results =====
2025 New York City Civil Court Manhattan district 3 special election
Party	Candidate	Votes	%
Democratic	Eric J. Wursthorn		
Write-in			
Total votes			100.00

=== 7th district (special) ===
==== Democratic nominee ====
- Onya Brinson

==== General election ====
===== Results =====
2025 New York City Civil Court Manhattan district 7 special election
Party	Candidate	Votes	%
Democratic	Onya Brinson		
Write-in			
Total votes			100.00

=== 8th district ===
==== Democratic primary ====
===== Candidates =====
====== Nominee ======
- Lisa Headley, incumbent justice

==== General election ====
===== Results =====
2025 New York City Civil Court Manhattan district 8 election
Party	Candidate	Votes	%
Democratic	Lisa S. Headley (incumbent)		
Write-in			
Total votes			100.00

=== 9th district (special) ===
==== Democratic primary ====
===== Candidates =====
====== Nominee ======
- Terence McCormick

==== General election ====
===== Results =====
2025 New York City Civil Court Manhattan district 9 special election
Party	Candidate	Votes	%
Democratic	Terrence W. McCormick		
Write-in			
Total votes			100.00

== Queens ==
=== At large (3 seats, special) ===
==== Primary election, vacancy 1 ====
===== Democratic primary =====
====== Candidates ======
Nominee

- Sheridan Chu, private practice law firm owner

Eliminated in primary

- John Ciafone, attorney and candidate in 2023 for the 6th district

====== Endorsements ======
Sheridan Chu

Political parties

- Queens County Democratic Party

====== Results ======

Chu

40–50%
50–60%
60–70%
70–80%
80–90%
90–100%

Ciafone

40–50%
50–60%
60–70%
70–80%
90–100%

Other

40–50% tie
50% tie
No votes

Democratic primary
Party	Candidate	Votes	%
Democratic	Sheridan C. Chu	99,451	58.88
Democratic	John J. Ciafone	68,270	40.42
Write-in		1,172	0.69
Total votes		168,893	100.00

===== Republican primary =====
====== Candidates ======
Nominee

- William Shanahan, attorney

==== Primary election, vacancy 2 ====
===== Democratic primary =====
====== Candidates ======
Nominee

- Indira Khan, trial lawyer

====== Endorsements ======
Indira Khan

Political parties

- Queens County Democratic Party

===== Republican primary =====
====== Candidates ======
Nominee

- Mary-Ann Maloney, attorney

==== Primary election, vacancy 3 ====
===== Democratic primary =====
====== Candidates ======
Nominee

- Oma Phillips, attorney

====== Endorsements ======
Oma Phillips

Political parties

- Queens County Democratic Party

===== Republican primary =====
====== Candidates ======
Nominee

- Stephen Dachtera, private attorney

==== General election ====
===== Results =====
2025 New York City Civil Court Queens at-large special election (vote for up to 3)
Party	Candidate	Votes	%
Democratic	Sheridan Chu	293,619	24.2
Democratic	Indira Khan	270,210	22.2
Democratic	Oma Phillips	259,361	21.4
Republican	Thomas Barra		
Conservative	Thomas Barra		
Total	Thomas Barra	119,816	9.9
Republican	William Shanahan		
Conservative	William Shanahan		
Total	William Shanahan	134,819	11.1
Republican	Susan Silverman		
Conservative	Susan Silverman		
Total	Susan Silverman	134,998	11.1
Write-in		1,921	0.2
Total votes		1,214,744	100.00

=== 1st district (special) ===
==== Democratic primary ====
===== Candidates =====
====== Nominee ======
- Juliette-Noor Haji, principal law clerk

====== Eliminated in primary ======
- Thomas Wright-Fernandez, attorney

===== Endorsements =====
Thomas Wright-Fernandez

Political parties

- Queens County Democratic Party

===== Results =====

Haji

50–60%
60–70%
70–80%

Wright-Fernandez

50–60%
60–70%
90–100%

Other

No votes

Democratic primary
Party	Candidate	Votes	%
Democratic	Juliette-Noor Haji	18,849	69.20
Democratic	Thomas Wright-Fernandez	8,267	30.35
Write-in		124	0.46
Total votes		27,240	100.00

==== General election ====
===== Results =====
2025 New York City Civil Court Queens district 1 special election
Party	Candidate	Votes	%
Democratic	Juliette-Noor Haji	47,881	98.9
Write-in		544	1.1
Total votes		48,425	100.00

=== 2nd district (2 seats, special) ===
==== Democratic primary ====
===== Candidates =====
====== Nominees ======
- Eve Cho Guillergan, private law practice owner
- Thomas Wright-Fernandez (selected by party after priamry)

====== Eliminated in primary ======
- Julie Milner, civil rights attorney

===== Endorsements =====
Eve Cho Guillergan

Political parties

- Queens County Democratic Party

===== Results =====

Guillergan

40–50%
50–60%
60–70%
70–80%

Milner

50–60%
60–70%

Other

50% tie
No votes

Democratic primary
Party	Candidate	Votes	%
Democratic	Eve Cho Guillergan	20,257	57.70
Democratic	Julie Milner	14,657	41.75
Write-in		191	0.54
Total votes		35,105	100.00

==== General election ====
===== Results =====
2025 New York City Civil Court Queens district 2 special election (vote for up to 2)
Party	Candidate	Votes	%
Democratic	Eve Cho Guillergan		
Democratic	Thomas Wright-Fernandez		
Republican	Stephen Dachtera		
Conservative	Stephen Dachtera		
Total	Stephen Dachtera		
Write-in			
Total votes			100.00

=== 4th district (2 seats, special) ===
==== Democratic primary ====
===== Candidates =====
====== Nominees ======
- Gail Adams
- Fania Jean

===== Endorsements =====
Gail Adams

Political parties

- Queens County Democratic Party

==== Republican nominee ====
- Mary-Ann Maloney

==== General election ====
===== Results =====
2025 New York City Civil Court Queens district 4 special election (vote for up to 2)
Party	Candidate	Votes	%
Democratic	Gail A. Adams		
Democratic	Fania Jean		
Republican	Mary-Ann Maloney		
Conservative	Mary-Ann Maloney		
Total	Mary-Ann Maloney		
Write-in			
Total votes			100.00

=== 5th district (special) ===
==== Democratic primary ====
===== Candidates =====
====== Nominee ======
- Jennifer Tubridy, judge for the Criminal Court of the City of New York

===== Endorsements =====
Jennifer Tubridy

Political parties

- Queens County Democratic Party

==== Republican primary ====
===== Candidates =====
====== Nominee ======
- Jennifer Tubridy, judge for the Criminal Court of the City of New York

==== General election ====
===== Results =====
2025 New York City Civil Court Queens district 5 special election
Party	Candidate	Votes	%
Democratic	Jennifer Tubridy		
Republican	Jennifer Tubridy		
Total	Jennifer Tubridy		
Write-in			
Total votes			100.00

== The Bronx ==
=== At-large (special) ===
==== Democratic primary ====
===== Candidates =====
====== Nominee ======
- Shekera Anessa Algarin, attorney

====== Eliminated in primary ======
- George Santana, candidate for judge in Manhattan in 2020

===== Results =====

Algarin

50–60%
60–70%
70–80%
80–90%

Santana

40–50%
50–60%
60–70%
70–80%

Other

40–50% tie
50% tie
No votes

Democratic primary
Party	Candidate	Votes	%
Democratic	Shekera Anessa Algarin	45,908	56.84
Democratic	George Santana	34,547	42.77
Write-in		318	0.39
Total votes		80,773	100.00

==== General election ====
===== Results =====
2025 New York City Civil Court The Bronx at-large special election
Party	Candidate	Votes	%
Democratic	Shekera Anessa Algarin	172,745	98.9
Write-in		1,984	1.1
Total votes		174,729	100.00

=== 1st district (special) ===
==== Democratic nominee ====
- Katherine O'Brien

==== General election ====
===== Results =====
2025 New York City Civil Court The Bronx district 1 special election
Party	Candidate	Votes	%
Democratic	Katherine O'Brien	87,825	98.9
Write-in		998	1.1
Total votes		88,823	100.00

=== 2nd district (special) ===
==== Democratic nominee ====
- Lauvienska Polanco

==== General election ====
===== Results =====
2025 New York City Civil Court The Bronx district 2 special election
Party	Candidate	Votes	%
Democratic	Shekera Anessa Algarin	81,371	98.9
Write-in		868	1.1
Total votes		82,239	100.00
