= New York City Civil Court =

Court in New York, United States

Civil Court of the City of New York
- Seal of the Unified Court System

- Electoral districts (from map on NYC OpenData)

Court overview
- Formed: September 1, 1962
- Jurisdiction: New York City
- Court executive: administrative judge; chief clerk
- Parent department: New York State Unified Court System
- Key documents: Civil Court Act as enacted; Civil Court Act as amended
- Website: nycourts.gov/…/civil

The Civil Court of the City of New York is a civil court of the New York State Unified Court System in New York City that decides lawsuits involving claims for damages up to $50,000 and includes a small claims part (small claims court) for cases involving amounts up to $10,000 as well as a housing part (housing court) for landlord-tenant matters, and also handles other civil matters referred by the New York Supreme Court. The court has divisions by county (borough), but it is a single citywide court.

It handles about 25% of all the New York state and local courts' total filings. The court consists of 3 parts: Housing, Small Claims, and General Civil. The court's jurisdiction includes ejectment actions, replevin of personal property within monetary limits, equity jurisdiction limited to real property actions, real property actions such as partitions, foreclosures within monetary limits, and actions to rescind or reform a contract.

== Housing Court ==
Housing Court is devoted to the enforcement of state and local housing standards laws. The housing part's (HP) fundamental purpose is to ensure that landlords provide safe and habitable housing. The majority of cases are eviction proceedings over unpaid rent.

The city's right-to-counsel law guarantees free legal services to all tenants facing eviction. People with gross household incomes at or below 200% of the federal poverty level can receive "full legal representation", whereas everyone can receive "brief legal assistance", regardless of immigration status and provided no later than their first scheduled appearance.

The housing part's enforcement and remedial powers include injunctions, restraining orders, and other orders to correct and prevent housing-code violations and to compensate aggrieved parties. Under Article 7A, one-third of tenants of a multiple dwelling may seek a judgment directing the deposit of rents into court for remedying conditions dangerous to life, health or safety.

=== Section 755 ===
7A supplements RPAPL § 755 which provides that in proceedings for non-payment of rent, the tenant may be permitted to deposit the rent into court pending cure of the violations if they can prove of the existence of dangerous conditions. Other state and local housing standards laws include the Multiple Dwelling Law of the Consolidated Laws, and the housing maintenance code, building code and health code of the New York City Administrative Code.

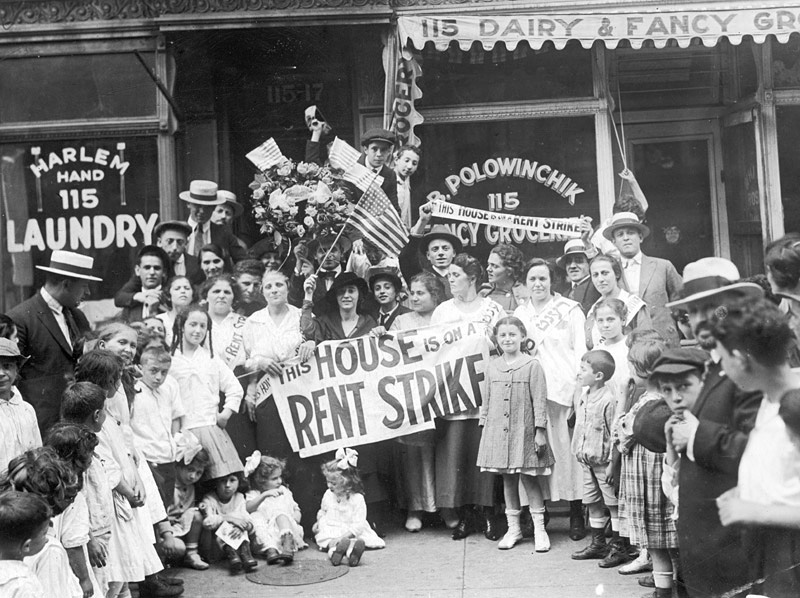
A rent strike in Harlem during the 1918–1920 rent strikes

== Small Claims Court ==
The Small Claims Part, commonly referred to as Small Claims Court, is the division of the court dedicated to resolving monetary disputes involving claims up to $10,000. Designed with simpler and more informal procedures compared to other parts of the court system, Small Claims Court encourages individuals to represent themselves, aiming to offer an accessible and efficient legal resolution path for the public.

The cases typically dealt with in this court involve personal or property damages, contract disputes, or disagreements over services rendered. The small filing fees and streamlined processes make it cost-effective for individuals or businesses involved in monetary disputes. Cases are heard by either judges or volunteer lawyer arbitrators, with arbitration often providing a faster resolution. In certain situations, disputes may be referred to mediation where a neutral third party facilitates an agreement between the disputing parties.

== Administration ==
The court's divisions are by each county (borough). In each division there are a number of court parts established by the Chief Administrative Judge. The "Housing Part" (HP) refers to the part of the Housing Court devoted exclusively to code enforcement.

Other parts include:

- Calendar part, for the maintaining and calling of a calendar of cases, and for the hearing and disposition of all motions and applications, including orders to show cause and applications for adjournments, in civil actions that have been placed on a reserve or ready calendar but not yet assigned to a trial part.
- Trial part, for the trial of civil actions and for the hearing and determination of all motions and applications, including orders to show cause, made after an action is assigned to a trial part.
- Motion part, for the hearing and determination of motions and applications that are not otherwise required to be made in a calendar part, trial part or conference part.
- Conference part, for the precalendar or pretrial conference of actions.
- Multipurpose part, for the performance of the functions of a calendar part, a trial part, a motion part, a conference part, as well as other special parts of court.

== Personnel ==
=== Judges ===
There are approximately 120 Civil Court judges in the New York City Civil Court. Civil Court judges may be assigned by the Chief Administrative Judge of New York to the Criminal Court, Family Court, or Supreme Court. At any given time, about 50 Civil Court judges are assigned to the Civil Court, with the rest assigned to the Criminal, Family or Supreme Courts.

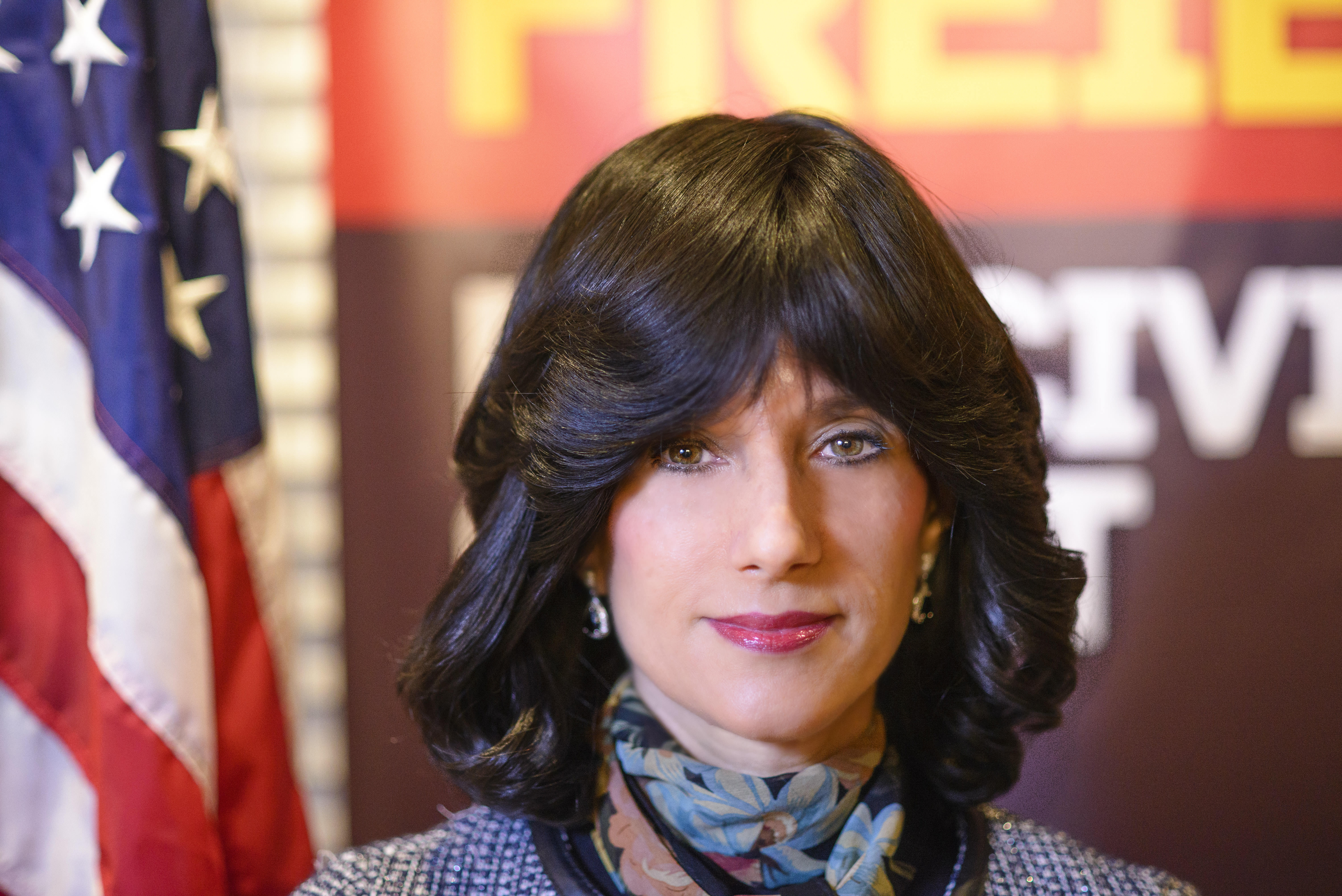
Rachel Freier was elected as a Civil Court judge for Brooklyn's 5th district in 2016, which overlapped with community board districts 7, 10, 11, and 12

Civil Court judges are elected countywide or from districts to 10-year terms, with vacancies filled by the mayor and with their service continuing until the last day of December after next election. The Legislature has consistently opted to fill judgeships using the preexisting mixed pattern of countywide and Municipal Court districts—

1. seats formerly held by City Court justices, elected on a countywide basis;
2. seats formerly held by Municipal Court justices, elected from districts located within counties; and
3. seats created by successive acts of the Legislature, elected on a countywide basis.

A candidate needs to file petitions to be considered a candidate for a political party's nomination in the general election; petitions containing 4,000 signatures are needed for a county-wide seat, and petitions containing 1,500 signatures are necessary for a district seat. Party leaders frequently designate candidates for the Civil Court judgeships, who then face an open primary against others who qualify for the ballot. The party machine usually manages to elect most of its judicial candidates.

=== Legal aid ===
The New York City Office of Civil Justice (OCJ) is responsible for implementing the city's right-to-counsel law.

=== Housing judges ===
There are approximately 50 Housing Court judges in the New York City Civil Court. In housing court, referees known as "housing judges" preside over most proceedings. Housing Court judges handle the housing parts of the New York City Civil Court, but are not judges provided for under Article VI of the New York Constitution. Housing judges are appointed by the Chief Administrative Judge to five-year terms from a list of qualified applicants screened and selected by the Housing Court Advisory Council. All 50 Housing Court judges serve in the Civil Court and cannot be assigned to other courts.

=== Arbitrators ===
With the consent of the parties, a volunteer arbitrator hears and decides disputes in small claims parts. Over 2800 arbitrators preside over 95% of the cases heard in small claims parts. They are appointed by the administrative judge of the court.

== Analysis and criticism ==
Landlords in New York City may use a blacklist of persons who have appeared in housing court as a plaintiff or defendant. Known among housing advocates and lawyers as the tenant blacklist, it is compiled by tenant-screening database companies from housing court records.

The appointment of housing judges has been criticized because the advisory council through which appointments are processed is composed largely of members of real estate interests and is not representative of the population.

== History ==
In 1759, so-called justices' courts held by the mayor, recorder or an alderman could try cases in controversy of not more than £5 (equivalent to £843 in 2025). In 1781, they were replaced by assistant justices' courts held by associate justices appointed by the governor. In 1787, these were replaced by assistant justices with the power of justices of the peace in other counties. In 1797, these were replaced with justices of the peace for the city and county of New York and were constituted as one court.

In 1807-1808 these were replaced by justices' courts and assistants justices' courts. In 1819, the justices' courts were renamed as the marine court of the city of New York, and in 1883 was renamed as the City Court of the City of New York. In 1848–1849 the assistants justices' courts were replaced with newly created justices' courts elected within six districts, and in 1852 these justices' courts were renamed as district courts, by 1857 divided into seven districts and by 1882 into ten districts, and by the city charter of 1897 the district courts of New York City and justices' courts of Brooklyn and Long Island City were consolidated into the Municipal Court of the City of New York. Small claims parts were added to the Municipal Court in 1934.

On September 1, 1962, the City Court and the Municipal Court were merged to form the current Civil Court. The Civil Court Act was primarily based upon the Municipal Court Code, and to some extent the New York City Court Act and the practice of the County Courts outside NYC. Francis E. Rivers on the City Court legislative committee criticized the new court act, calling it "outdated" and "radically limited by practice provisions adapted to conditions existing more than a half century ago" given that it used Municipal Court Code legal procedure instead of the newer Civil Practice Act.

In 1820, a landlord-drafted act removed the common law six-month waiting period for ejectments, allowing summary eviction and removal of tenants for nonpayment. The Tenement House Act of 1901 was enacted by Progressive reformers to ban the construction of poor-quality apartment buildings. The Housing Stability and Tenant Protection Act of 2019 introduced major changes to landlord-tenant law.

The housing part and its housing judges were created on April 1, 1973. In Glass v Thompson the Appellate Division held the appointment of "hearing officers" to preside over non-jury trials in the housing part was constitutional, suggesting that although they were able to preside over housing matters and exercise judicial functions, their office was distinct from that of a judge of the Civil Court because they are essentially referees: nonjudicial officers of the court appointed to assist it in the performance of its judicial functions. In 1978 they were renamed as "housing judges" with the intent to improve their stature, though they "are still nonjudicial officers of the court".

== See also ==
- NYC Office of Administrative Trials and Hearings (OATH), the main city administrative court
- New York City Criminal Court
- Government of New York City
- Law of New York
  - Rent regulation in New York

== General and cited references ==
- "The New York City Civil Court Act". Laws of New York. Vol. 185th sess.: III. 1962. pp. 3203–3252. hdl:2027/uc1.b4378119. ISSN 0892-287X. Chapter 693, enacted 24 April 1962, effective 1 September 1962.
- "New York City Municipal Court Code". Laws of New York. Vol. 138th sess.: I. 1915. pp. 835–905. hdl:2027/nyp.33433090742754. ISSN 0892-287X. Chapter 279, enacted 14 April 1915, effective 1 September 1915.
- Lebovits, Gerald (May 15, 2007), HP Proceedings: A Primer, New York State Judicial Institute
