= New York county courts =

Trial-level courts in New York

The County Courts are courts within the New York State Unified Court System located in each county outside New York City. In New York City, criminal and civil matters are heard in the city Criminal Court and Civil Court, respectively, or the state Supreme Court.

== Jurisdiction ==
The court has unlimited criminal jurisdiction and civil jurisdiction where the amount in controversy is no more than $25,000. County courts primarily hear criminal cases, while the Supreme Court primarily hears civil cases, and usually only felonies as lesser crimes are handled by local courts.

== Structure ==
A County Court operates in each county except for the five counties of New York City (in those counties, the New York City Courts and Supreme Court operate in place of a typical County Court). Unlike the Supreme Court, each County Court is considered distinct.

The County Court is authorized to establish "appellate sessions", an intermediate appellate court that hears appeals from the inferior courts. Appellate sessions are located in the Third and Fourth Judicial Departments only.

== Judges ==
Judges are elected to ten-year terms.

== Appellate procedure ==
Appeals in criminal cases originating in the County Court and in civil cases are taken to the Supreme Court, Appellate Division as of right, except for civil appeals in the Second Department, which are taken to the Appellate Term of the Supreme Court. In criminal matters in which the County Court acts as an appellate court, further appeal is to the Court of Appeals and may be taken only by permission of a judge of the Court of Appeals.

== General and cited references ==
- Gibson, Ellen M.; Manz, William H. (2004). Gibson's New York Legal Research Guide (PDF) (3rd ed.). Wm. S. Hein Publishing. ISBN 1-57588-728-2. LCCN 2004042477. OCLC 54455036.
- Galie, Peter J. (1991). The New York State Constitution: A Reference Guide. Reference Guides to the State Constitutions of the United States. ABC-CLIO. ISBN 0-313-26156-3. LCCN 90-36627.
- NYSBA Committee on Legal Education and Admission to the Bar; NYSBA Membership Committee (September 2012). The Practice of Law in New York State: An Introduction For Newly-Admitted Attorneys (PDF). New York State Bar Association. Archived from the original (PDF) on July 15, 2014.
