= New York Surrogate's Court =

Probate court of New York

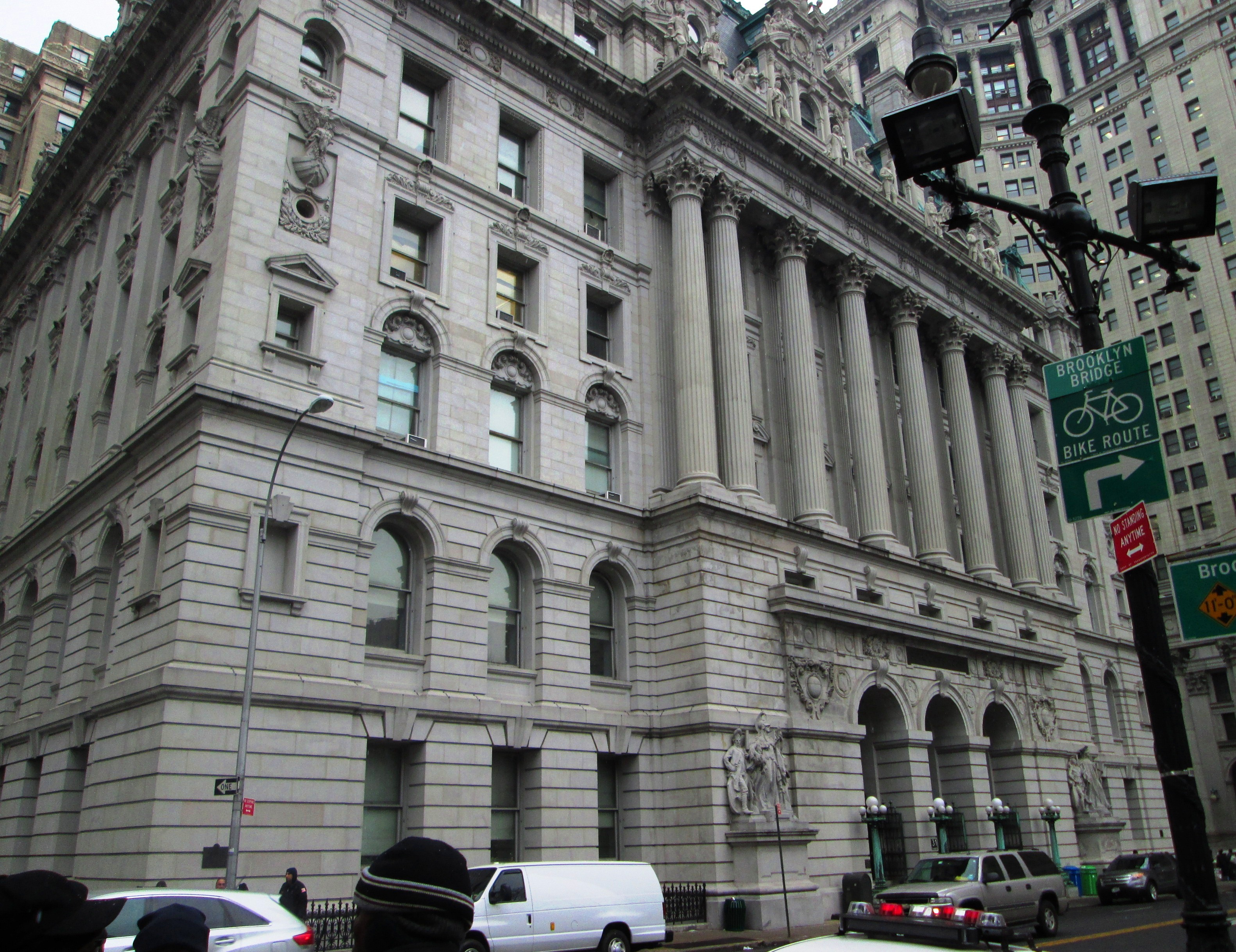
The Surrogate's Courthouse in Manhattan

The Surrogate's Court of the State of New York handles all probate and estate proceedings in the New York State Unified Court System. All wills are probated and all estates of people who die without a will are handled in this court. Unclaimed property of the deceased without wills is handled by the judges of this court. It also handles adoptions.

There is a Surrogate's Court in each county in the state. The judges of this court are styled the "Surrogate of [X] County". The surrogate is elected countywide, and is required to be a resident of the pertaining county. Each of New York's 62 counties has one surrogate, except New York County and Kings County which have two each. Surrogates are elected to 10-year terms, except those in the five counties within New York City where surrogates are elected to 14-year terms. In some counties, usually those with a small number of inhabitants, the judge of the County Court holds at the same time the office of surrogate.

There have been frequent efforts to abolish the Surrogate's Court and redistribute its powers to the New York Supreme Court (the general trial court) and the Family Court. The most recent efforts stem from the corruption scandal surrounding former Brooklyn Surrogate Michael Feinberg, who was removed from the bench in 2005.

== See also ==
- New York State Courts Electronic Filing System
- Probate court for other jurisdictions
- Surrogate's Courthouse, building in lower Manhattan
