= Judiciary of New York =

Judicial branch of the New York state government

The flag of New York

The judiciary of the State of New York (officially the New York State Unified Court System) is the judicial branch of the New York state government, comprising all the courts of the State of New York (excluding extrajudicial administrative courts).

The Court of Appeals, sitting in Albany and consisting of seven judges, is the state's highest court. The Appellate Division of the New York State Supreme Court is the principal intermediate appellate court. The New York State Supreme Court is the trial court of general jurisdiction in civil cases statewide and in criminal cases in New York City. Outside New York City, the 57 individual County Courts hear felony criminal cases. There are a number of local courts in different parts of the state, including the New York City Civil Court and New York City Criminal Court.

By one estimate, debt collection actions are 25% of all lawsuits in state courts. The system is administered by the Chief Judge of the State of New York, working with the Chief Administrative Judge, other administrative judges, the Office of Court Administration, and other agencies.

== Courts ==
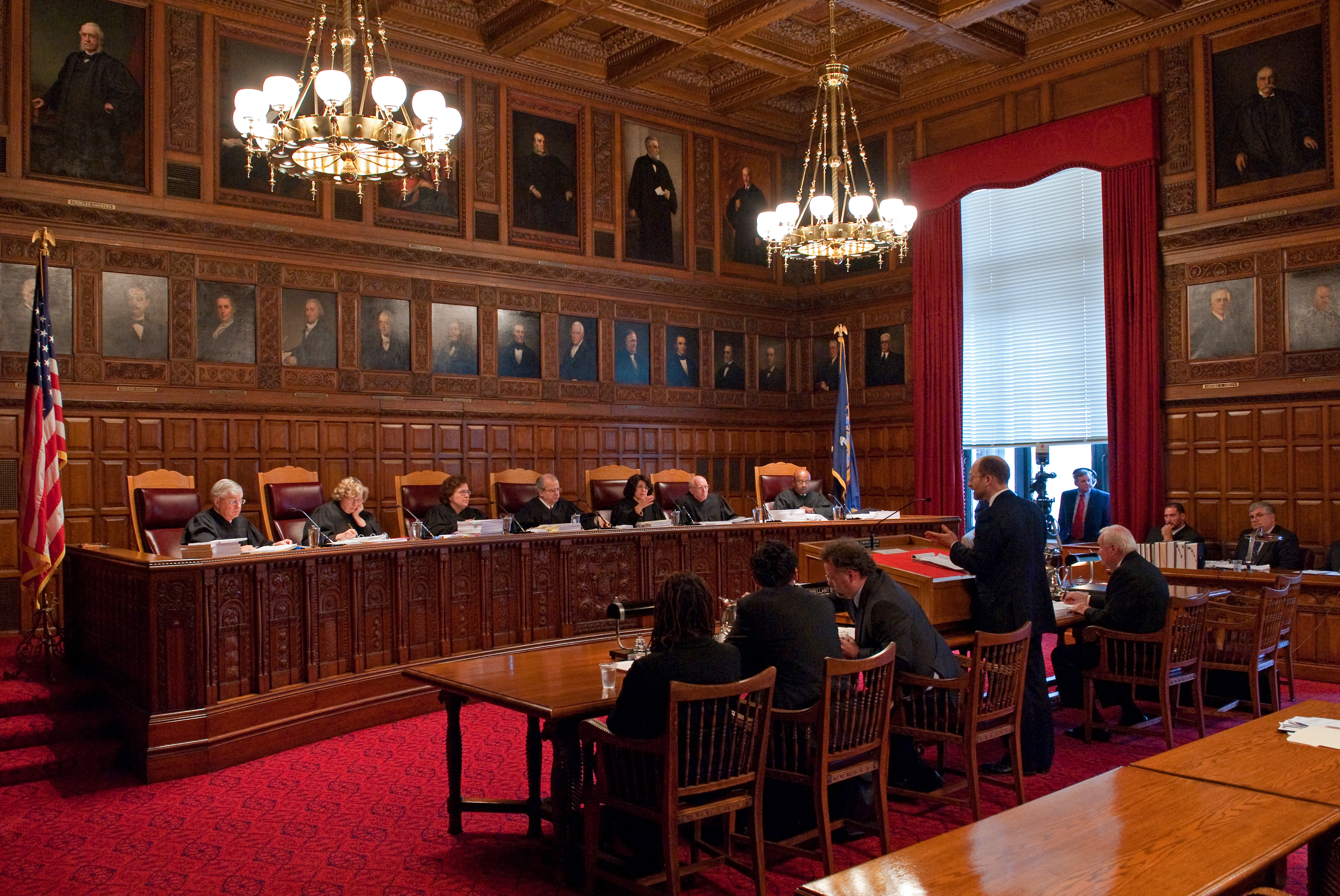
The Court of Appeals hearing oral arguments in Court of Appeals Hall

In general, the judicial system is composed of the appellate courts and the trial courts, consisting of the superior courts and the local courts.

The appellate courts are the:

- Court of Appeals
- Appellate Division of the Supreme Court
- appellate terms of the Supreme Court
- appellate sessions of the County Court

The superior courts are the:

- Supreme Court
- County Court
- specialized courts (Family Court, Surrogate's Court, Court of Claims)

And the local courts:

- District Court
- New York City courts (NYC Civil Court, NYC Criminal Court)
- city courts
- justice courts (town and village courts)

There are also other tribunals that are not normally considered part of the New York State Unified Court System or the judiciary proper.

=== Court of Appeals ===
The New York State Court of Appeals is the state's highest court. In civil cases, appeals are taken almost exclusively from decisions of the Appellate Divisions. In criminal cases, depending on the type of case and the part of the state in which it arose, appeals can be heard from decisions of the Appellate Division, the Appellate Term, and the County Court.

=== Appellate Division of the Supreme Court ===
The New York Supreme Court, Appellate Division is the state's second-highest court, and is regionally divided into four judicial departments. It primarily hears appeals from the superior courts in civil cases, the Supreme Court in criminal cases, and the County Court in felony criminal cases in the Third and Fourth Judicial Departments. In addition, in civil cases it may hear appeals from the appellate terms of the Supreme Court when these courts have heard appeals from one of the lower trial courts.

=== Superior courts ===
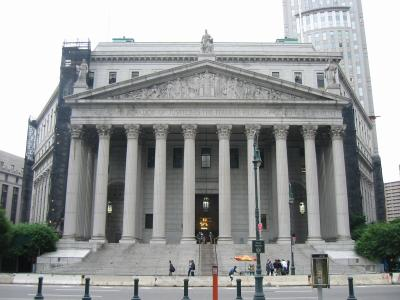
The New York County Courthouse in Manhattan

The court of general jurisdiction in New York is the New York Supreme Court. (Unlike in most other states, the Supreme Court is a trial court and is not the highest court in the state.) There is a branch of the New York Supreme Court in each of New York State's 62 counties.

In New York City, the Supreme Court in each county hears all felony cases; outside New York City, these cases are generally heard in the County Court. The Supreme Court hears civil cases seeking money damages that exceed the monetary limits of the local courts' jurisdiction. The Supreme Court has exclusive jurisdiction over most cases in which a party seeks equitable relief such as an injunction, declaratory judgment actions, or proceedings for review of many administrative-agency rulings. The court also has exclusive jurisdiction over matrimonial actions seeking a divorce, legal separation, or annulment of a marriage. In several counties the Supreme Court has a specialized Commercial Division that hears commercial cases.

The New York State County Court operates in each county except for the five counties of New York City (in those counties, the Civil Court, Criminal Court and Supreme Court operate in place of a typical County Court). In many counties, this court primarily hears criminal cases (whereas the Supreme Court primarily hears civil cases), and usually only felonies as lesser crimes are handled by local courts.

- The Family Court has exclusive jurisdiction over certain matters involving minors, including juvenile delinquency charges, status offenses, child abuse and neglect, termination of parental rights, adoption, and guardianships. It also handles aspects of domestic relations disputes including child support and child custody (although only the Supreme Court can grant a divorce).
- The Surrogate's Court exercises exclusive jurisdiction over probate and related matters, and also has jurisdiction over certain guardianship matters (concurrent with the Supreme Court) and over adoption proceedings (concurrent with the Family Court).
- The Court of Claims hears actions seeking monetary damages against the State of New York itself. The judges are appointed by the Governor subject to confirmation by the State Senate.

=== Local courts ===
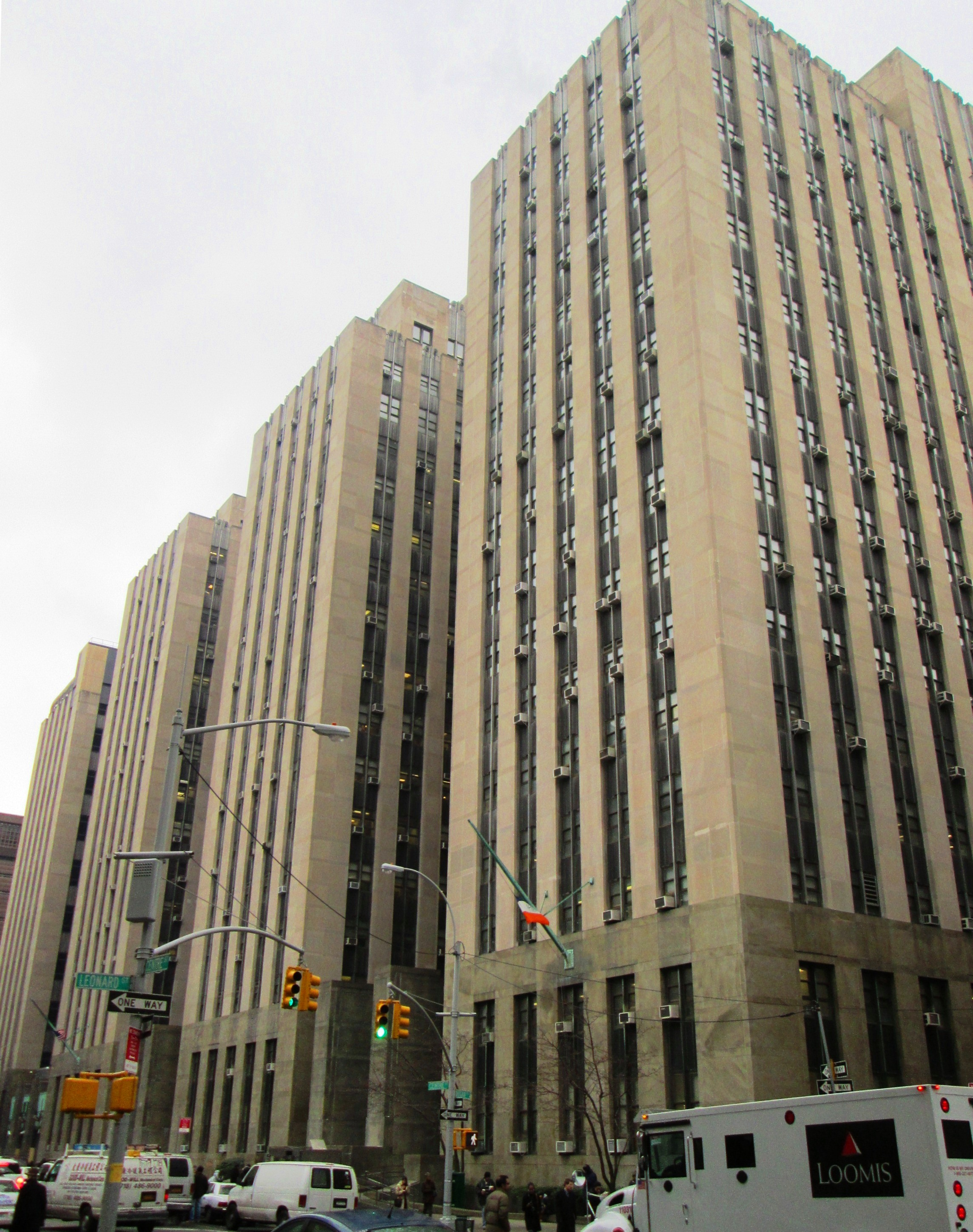
100 Centre Street Criminal Courts Building, connected to the Tombs

- City courts handle the arraignment of felonies, try misdemeanors and lesser offenses, and try civil lawsuits involving claims of up to $15,000. The New York City Criminal Court and the New York City Civil Court are the local courts in the 5 boroughs of New York City. Some city courts have small claims parts for the informal disposition of matters involving claims of up to $5,000 and/or housing parts to handle landlord-tenant matters and housing violations.
- The District Court is the local criminal and civil court in Nassau County and the five western towns of Suffolk County. It arraigns felonies and tries misdemeanors and lesser offenses, as well as civil lawsuits involving claims of up to $15,000, small claims and small commercial claims up to $5000, and landlord-tenant actions.
- Justice courts (town and village courts) try misdemeanors and lesser offenses in towns and villages. These courts are the starting point for all criminal cases outside cities, and handle a variety of other matters including small claims, traffic ticket cases and local zoning matters. They also arraign defendants accused of felonies. These courts may hear civil lawsuits involving claims of up to $3,000 (including small claims cases of up to $3,000). Unlike all other courts, which are state funded, the town and village justice courts are locally funded. Justices are chosen by local election and are not required to have a Juris Doctor degree, license to practice or any other formal legal or law enforcement training, although upon election they are provided with training and are subject to an annual continuing education requirement.

=== Extrajudicial courts ===
There are numerous administrative courts that are not considered part of the judicial branch of government.

- The Traffic Violations Bureau (TVB) is a part of the state Department of Motor Vehicles that adjudicates non-criminal traffic violations (other than parking violations) in New York City.
- The New York City Office of Administrative Trials and Hearings (OATH) is an agency of the New York city government that conducts administrative hearings, overseeing the operations of four tribunals: the OATH Tribunal, the Environmental Control Board, the Health Tribunal, and the Taxi & Limousine Tribunal.
- The New York Court for the Trial of Impeachments, often referred to as the Impeachment Court or sometimes as the High Court of Impeachment, is for the trial of state officers who had been impeached by the State Assembly.

== Appeal structure ==
As New York has 11 separate trial courts, and some courts appeal differently based on which Judicial Department they are located in, the sequence of appeals is fairly complex:

- The Supreme Court, County Court civil and felony cases, Family Court, Surrogate's Court, and Court of Claims appeal to the Supreme Court, Appellate Division.
- In the 1st and 2nd Departments: the New York City Civil Court, New York City Criminal Court, other City Courts, District Court, Town Justice Courts, Village Justice Courts, and County Court non-felony criminal cases appeal to the Supreme Court, Appellate Term.
- In the 3rd and 4th Departments: City Courts, Town Justice Courts, and Village Justice Courts appeal to the County Court, Appellate Session.

== Law ==
=== Precedent ===
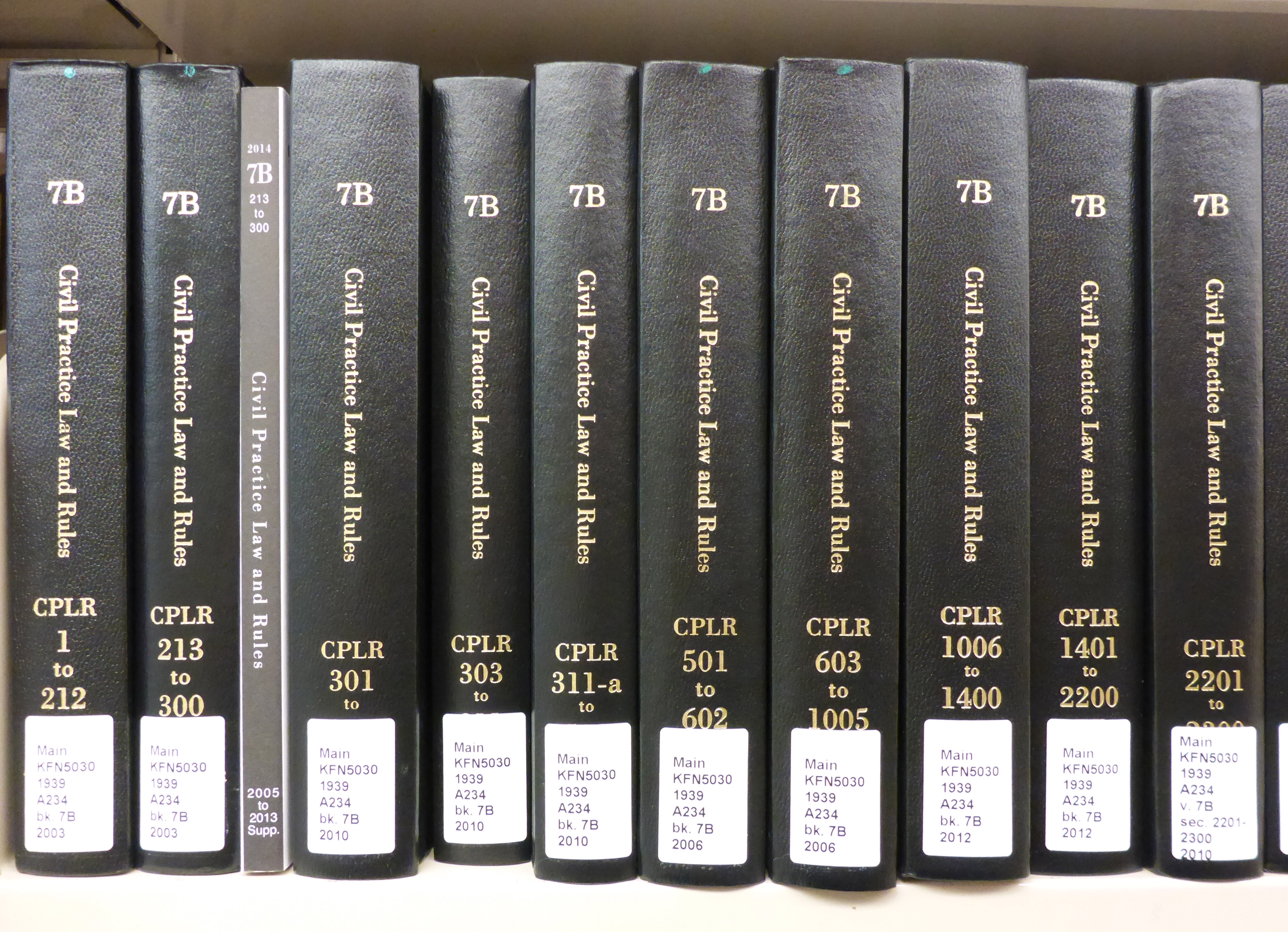
The McKinney's annotated version of the Civil Practice Law and Rules

Decisions of the New York Court of Appeals are binding authority on all other courts, and persuasive authority for itself in later cases. Decisions of the New York Supreme Court, Appellate Division department panels are binding on the lower courts in that department, and also on lower courts in other departments unless there is contrary authority from the Appellate Division of that department. Decisions by the Supreme Court, Appellate Term must be followed by courts whose appeals lie to it. Published trial court decisions are persuasive authority for all other courts in the state.

The New York Reports and Appellate Division Reports contain the opinions, memorandums, and motions sent by the Court of Appeals and the Supreme Court Appellate Division, respectively. The appellate term and trial court opinions are published selectively in the Miscellaneous Reports. The current versions are the New York Reports 3d (cited as N.Y.3d), the Appellate Division Reports 3d (cited as A.D.3d) and the Miscellaneous Reports 3d (cited as Misc.3d).

=== Procedure ===
The Civil Practice Law and Rules (CPLR) governs legal procedure such as jurisdiction, venue, and pleadings, as well certain areas of substantive law such as the statute of limitations and joint and several liability.

The New York State Courts Electronic Filing System (NYSCEF) is the electronic court filing (e-filing, like the federal CM/ECF system) system used by the Unified Court System. It supports civil proceedings and criminal proceedings in participating courts. Criminal filings that are otherwise publicly accessible cannot be inspected online through NYSCEF, although certain unsealed documents may be published separately by the chief administrator.

== Administration ==
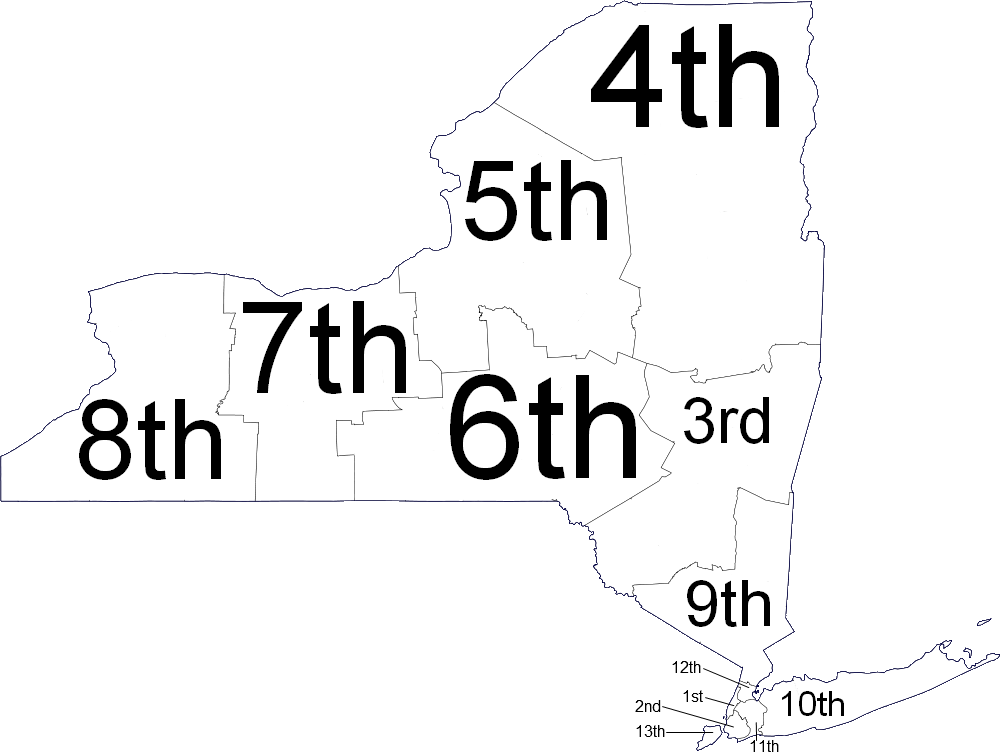
Map of judicial districts as of 2012

The Judiciary of New York is a unified state court system that functions under the Chief Judge of the New York Court of Appeals who is the ex officio Chief Judge of New York. The Chief Judge supervises the seven-judge Court of Appeals and is chair of the Administrative Board of the Courts. In addition, the Chief Judge establishes standards and administrative policies after consultation with the Administrative Board and approval by the Court of Appeals. The Administrative Board is composed of the chief judge and presiding justices of each Supreme Court Appellate Division department. The Chief Administrator (or Chief Administrative Judge if a judge) is appointed by the Chief Judge with the advice and consent of the Administrative Board and oversees the administration and operation of the court system, assisted by the Office of Court Administration.

The court system is currently divided into thirteen judicial districts: seven upstate districts each comprising between five and eleven counties, five districts corresponding to the boroughs or counties of New York City, and one district on Long Island. In each judicial district outside New York City, an Administrator (or Administrative Judge if a judge) is responsible for supervising all courts and agencies, while inside New York City an Administrator (or Administrative Judge) supervises each major court. Administrators are assisted by Supervising Judges who are responsible in the on-site management of the trial courts, including court caseloads, personnel, and budget administration, and each manage a particular type of court within a county or judicial district. District Executives (outside New York City) and Chief Clerks (inside New York City) assist the local administrators in carrying out their responsibilities for supervising the day-to-day operations of the trial courts. The district administrative offices are responsible for personnel, purchasing, budgets, revenue, computer automation, court interpreters, court security, and case management.

Map of the four departments of the New York Supreme Court, Appellate Division: First Department / Second Department; Third Department / Fourth Department

The New York State Reporter of the New York State Law Reporting Bureau is the official reporter of decisions and is required to publish every opinion, memorandum, and motion sent to it by the Court of Appeals and the Appellate Divisions of the Supreme Court in the New York Reports and Appellate Division Reports, respectively. The State Reporter is appointed by the Court of Appeals.

The Judicial Conference of the State of New York is responsible for surveying current practice in the administration of the state's courts, compiling statistics, and suggesting legislation and regulations. The New York State Judicial Institute serves as a statewide center for the education, training, and research facility for judges, justices, and other personnel.

In the State Legislature, the Senate Judiciary and Assembly Judiciary standing committees conduct legislative oversight, budget advocacy, and otherwise report bills on the judicial branch, both state and local courts. All courts, except justice courts (town and village courts), are financed by the state in a single court budget. During 2009, the judiciary had approximately 1300 judges, 4.6 million new cases, and a budget in excess of $2.5 billion. As of 2015 it had a $2 billion budget, 3,600 state and locally paid judges and over 15,000 nonjudicial employees in over 300 locations around the state.

== Personnel ==
There are several officers of the court, including judges, jurors, and bailiffs, and other personnel.

=== Judges ===
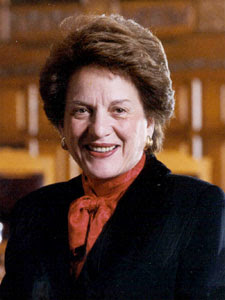
Judith Kaye was Chief Judge from 1993 to 2008

Judges of the Court of Appeals are appointed by the Governor with the advice and consent of Senate upon recommendation of the Commission on Judicial Nomination. Judges of the Court of Claims are appointed in the same manner, without the requirement of a commission recommendation. All other justices are elected, with the exception of those of the New York City Criminal Courts, New York City Family Court, and some other city courts, which are appointed by the mayor. Supreme Court justices are nominated by judicial district nominating conventions (with judicial delegates themselves elected from assembly districts), while New York City Civil Court and Surrogate's Court judges are nominated in primary elections.

Family Court judges serve 10-year terms; those outside New York City are elected, while those in New York City are appointed to by the Mayor. Surrogates serve 14-year terms within New York City and 10-year terms elsewhere in the state. Full-time city court judges serve 10-year terms, and part-time city court judges serve six-year terms. District Court judges are elected to six-year terms. Justice court justices are elected to four-year terms. The majority of justice court justices are not attorneys, and non-attorney justices must successfully complete a certification course and participate in continuing judicial education. New York City Criminal Court judges are appointed by the Mayor of New York City to 10-year terms from a list of candidates submitted by the Mayor's Advisory Committee on the Judiciary. New York City Civil Court judges are elected from districts to 10-year terms, with vacancies filled by the mayor and service continuing until the last day of December after next election.

Once a judge is elected or appointed, the Chief Judge, in consultation with the Chief Administrative Judge, Administrative Judges, Supervising Judges and the Presiding Justice of the relevant Appellate Division, assigns judges to a court and a part, not necessarily the court and county in which they were elected or appointed, including to the Supreme Court (but not its Appellate Division or Appellate Term) as Acting Supreme Court Judges.

Judges are regulated by the Rules Governing Judicial Conduct promulgated by the Chief Administrative Judge, the Code of Judicial Conduct adopted by the New York State Bar Association, and the relevant rules of the respective Appellate Division departments. The eleven-member New York State Commission on Judicial Conduct receives complaints, investigates, and makes initial determinations regarding judicial conduct and may recommend admonition, censure, or removal from office to the Chief Judge and Court of Appeals. The Ethics Commission for the Unified Court System administers financial disclosure requirements. The New York State Advisory Committee on Judicial Ethics issues confidential advisory opinions regarding judicial conduct.

Along with the unusual names for the courts, judges in the Supreme Court and the justice courts are called justices, while in the Court of Appeals and in other courts such as the Family Court, County Court, and Surrogates' courts, they are called judges.

=== Jurors ===
The Judiciary Law states that all litigants (who have the right to a jury trial) have the right to juries selected from a fair cross section of the community and that all eligible citizens shall have both the opportunity and the obligation to serve. Potential jurors are randomly selected from lists of registered voters, holders of a driver's licenses or ID issued by the Division of Motor Vehicles, New York state income tax filers, recipients of unemployment insurance or family assistance, and from volunteers. The grand jury is organized pursuant to article 190 of the Criminal Procedure Law.

=== Attorneys ===
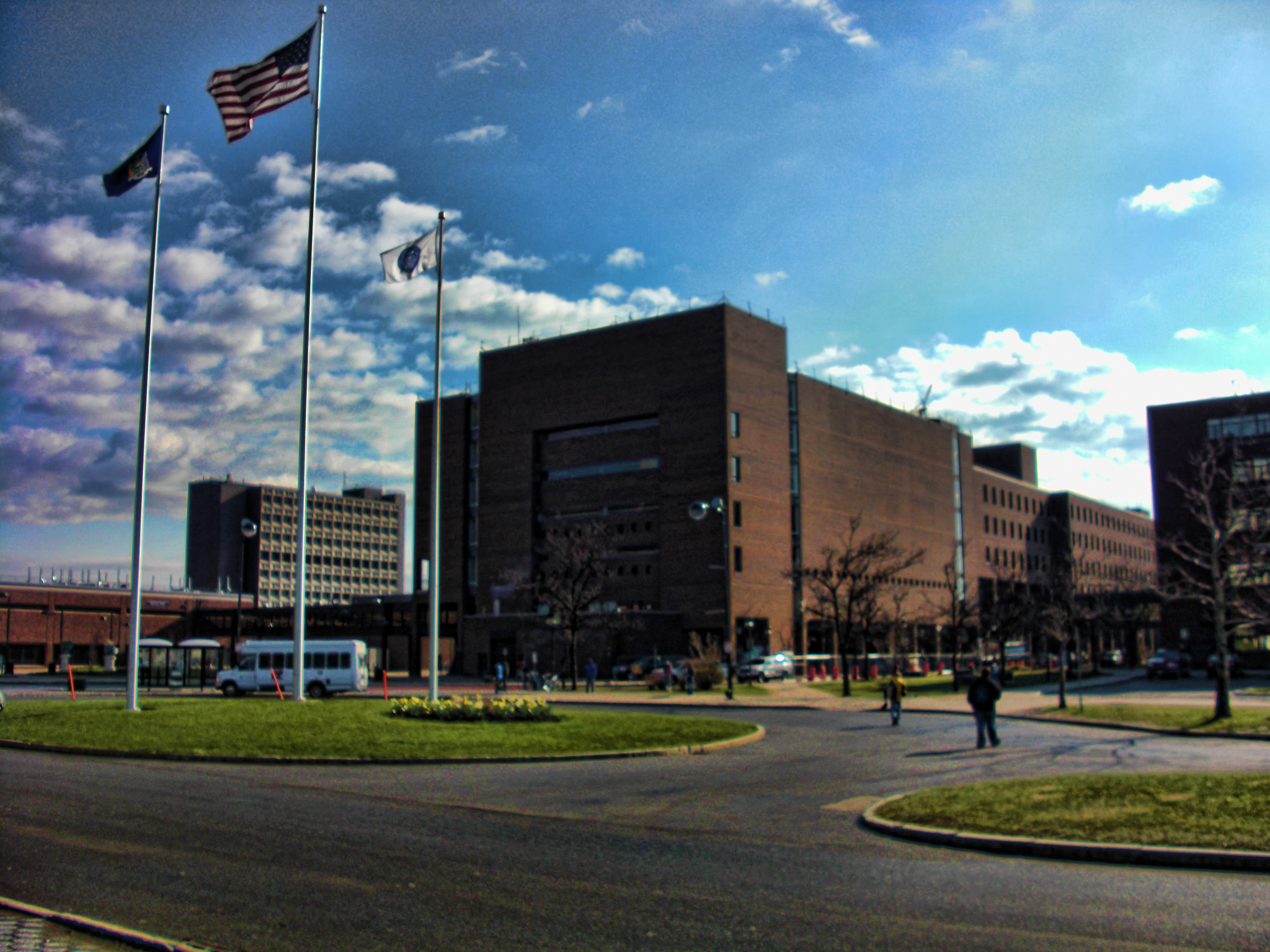
SUNY Buffalo Law School, one of two public law schools in New York state.

The Court of Appeals promulgates rules for admission to practice law in New York. The New York State Education Department promulgates standards for law school education (which defer to the requirements of the Rules of the New York Court of Appeals pertaining to legal education and prerequisites to the study of law), and the New York State Board of Law Examiners administers the New York State bar examination.

Attorneys are admitted to the New York bar by one of the Appellate Division departments rather than by the Court of Appeals, though once admitted to any of the Appellate Division departments the attorney is admitted to practice and appear before all New York courts, including the Court of Appeals. Applicants must be interviewed in person by a member of the Appellate Division department's character and fitness committee after passing the Uniform Bar Exam, Multistate Professional Responsibility Examination, New York Law Course, and New York Law Exam.

Lawyers are regulated by various state laws, the Rules of Professional Conduct (based on the ABA Model Rules of Professional Conduct), and rules adopted by each department of the Appellate Division. Each department of the Appellate Division has attorney grievance committees that investigate complaints of attorney misconduct and may issue reprimands or recommend censure, suspension, or disbarment to the Appellate Division.

The New York State Bar Association is a voluntary bar association of New York, but others exist such the New York City Bar Association.

==== District attorneys ====
All counties (including each of the five counties of New York City) elect a district attorney for four-year terms, whose duty it is to prosecute all crimes and offenses cognizable by the courts of the county.

District attorneys are legally permitted to delegate the prosecution of petty crimes or offenses. For example, prosecutors do not normally handle New York City Criminal Court summons court cases, and the NYPD's Legal Bureau has a memorandum of understanding with the district attorneys, at least in Manhattan, allowing the NYPD to selectively prosecute them.

==== Public defenders ====
The system of public defenders is run by county governments. Each county must provide representation by any combination of a public defender, legal aid society, and/or panel of qualified lawyers (pursuant to County Law article 18-B). For a comparison of relative activity in 2009 in New York City, legal aid societies handled 290,251 cases, of which 568 went to trial, whereas 18-B lawyers represented 42,212 defendants of which 623 went to trial.

The state Mental Hygiene Legal Service (MHLS) provides legal representation, advice, and assistance to mentally disabled persons under the care or jurisdiction of state-operated or licensed facilities concerning their admission, retention, care, or treatment.

==== Local government attorneys ====
New York local government attorneys represent municipal corporations and other local public entities in civil matters, including counties, cities, towns, villages, special districts, and local public authorities. Their authority, appointment, and duties are defined primarily by the specific statutes governing each class of local government entity, supplemented by local charters and home-rule laws.

All counties outside New York City have a county attorney appointed by the county's governing board for a term concurrent with that board's members. Unlike elected district attorneys, who handle criminal prosecutions, county attorneys are generally appointed officials focused on civil matters. However, they may handle certain quasi-criminal or family court matters on behalf of the government. Notably, in juvenile delinquency cases (New York Family Court proceedings for youth offenders), the county attorney’s office often serves as the presentment agency (prosecutor) outside New York City. (In New York City, the Corporation Counsel fulfills that role.) Similarly, county attorneys may prosecute or enforce local laws and infractions that are not handled by the district attorney’s office, such as violations of county ordinances or codes.

The five counties comprising New York City do not have separate county attorneys. Instead, the city's centralized Law Department, led by the New York City Corporation Counsel, provides legal counsel for the city (and by extension, for the five boroughs) in all civil matters. The Law Department's attorneys represent the City, the Mayor, and all municipal agencies in defensive and affirmative litigation, draft and review legislation and contracts, and handle family court prosecutions (such as juvenile delinquency) and minor criminal prosecutions under city ordinances.

=== Others ===
The county clerk acts as clerk of the Supreme Court, Civil Branch, and commissioner of jurors for the Supreme Court for both the Civil and Criminal branches. They summon people for jury duty, keep court records, and collect revenue. They are appointed by the presiding justice of the Appellate Division of the relevant judicial department.

Judicial hearing officers (JHOs) adjudicate most universal summons (summons court) cases in New York City Criminal Court, assist in Criminal Court compliance parts in domestic violence cases, and in the New York Supreme Court monitor substance abuse program defendants, conduct pre-trial suppression hearings and make recommended findings of fact and law to sitting judges. JHOs are appointed by the Chief Administrator.

Support magistrates hear support cases (petitions filed seeking support for a child or spouse) and paternity cases (petitions filed requesting the court to enter an order declaring someone to be the father of a child).

A court attorney is a lawyer who works with and assists the judge by researching legal questions and helping to write decisions. The court attorney may also meet with the attorneys or parties to a case to try to reach an agreement without the need for a trial.

==== Court Officers ====
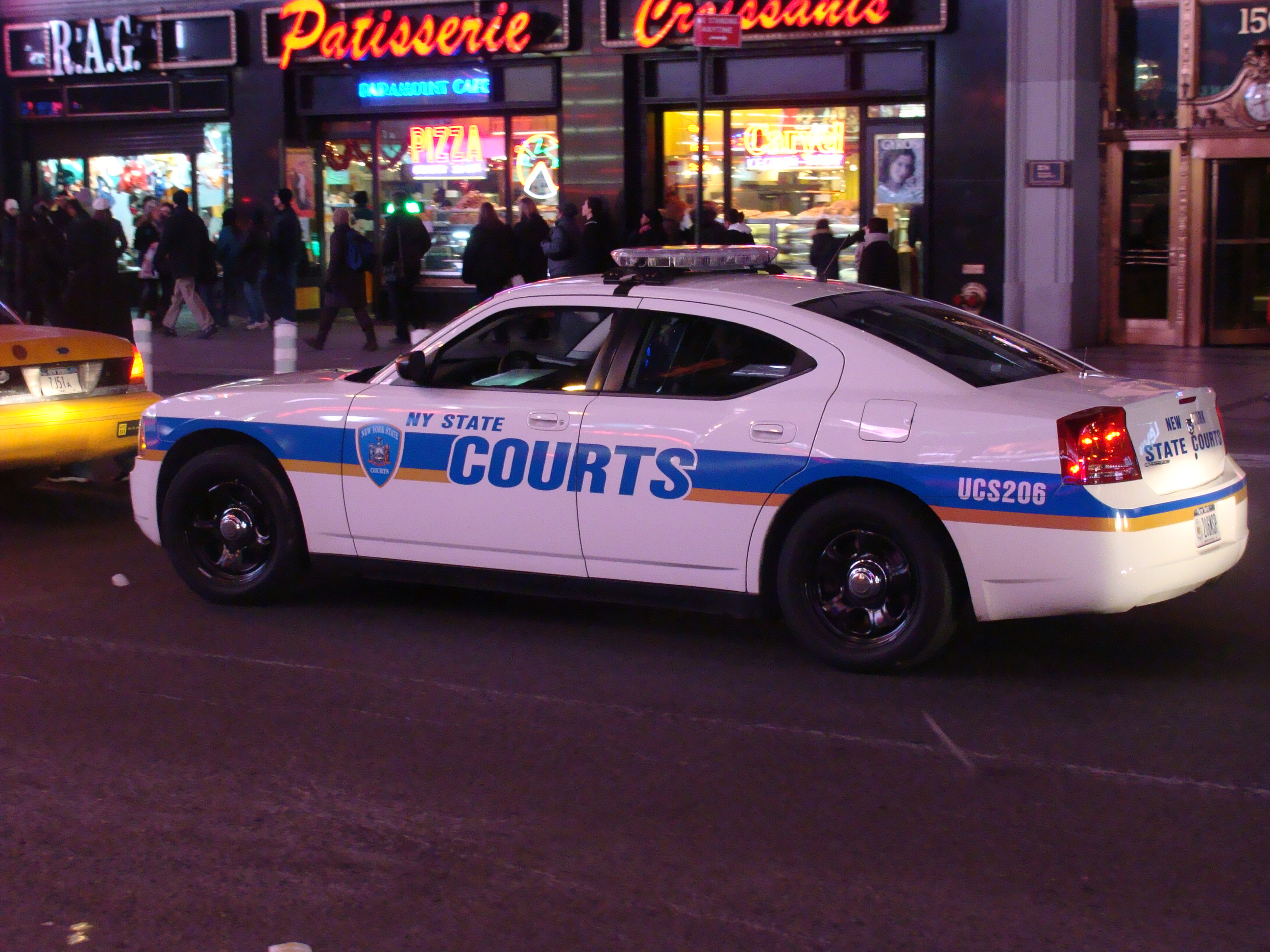
A New York State Court Officer cruiser in Times Square

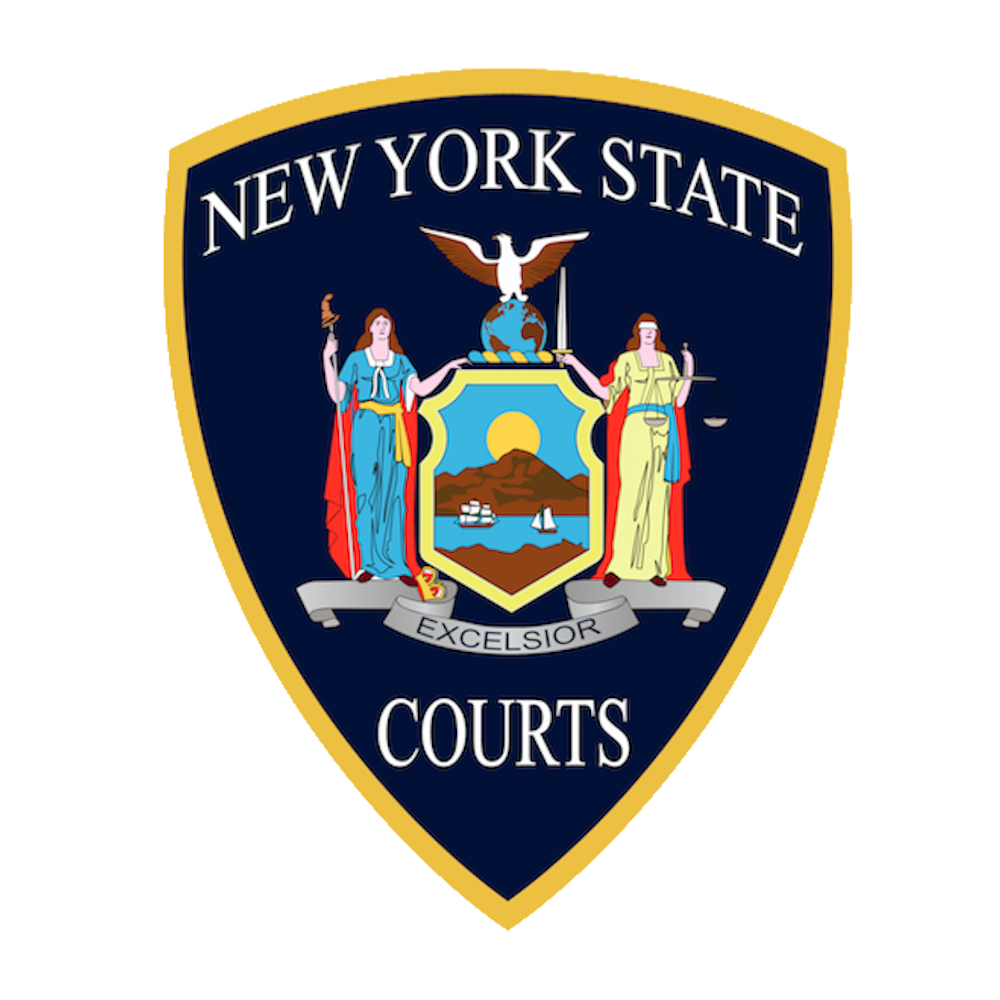
NYS Court Officer Patch, worn by all uniformed officers

New York State Court Officers are armed law enforcement officers who provide security services to the New York State Unified Court System (i.e. bailiffs), and enforce state and city laws at all facilities operated by the New York State Unified Court System.

They are designated as New York State peace officers under Criminal Procedure Law § 2.10 Court officers are also authorized to execute bench warrants only, and issue summonses for penal law violations and parking violations (when pursuant to their duties), in accordance with Criminal Procedure Law § 2.20.

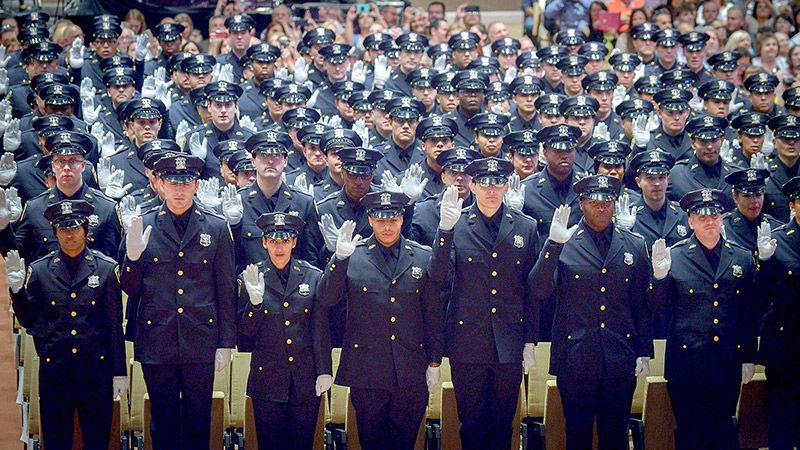
Court Officer Training Class in 2024

NYS Court Officers must fit certain requirements, before becoming a Court Officer, including:

- age (aged 20.5 or older)
- be a U.S. citizen and N.Y.S. resident
- have a driving license
- and have a high-school diploma.

Officers have the opportunity to promote and specialise, with rank structure similar to other NYC/NYS law enforcement agencies.

They can also join different units, such as the:

- Special Response Team (SRT)
- Mobile Security Patrol (MSP)
- or training at the Court Officers Academy.

Rank Structure of the NYS Court Officers:

Title	Insignia
Chief Court Officer	
Deputy Chief Court Officer	
Court Officer - Major	
Court Officer - Captain	
Court Officer - Lieutenant	
Court Officer - Sergeant	
Court Officer	

== Analysis and criticism ==
New York's use of remand (pre-trial detention) and bail procedures have been criticized. For example, New York is one of only four states that does not allow judges to consider public safety when making a bail determination. And almost without exception, New York judges only set two kinds of bail at arraignment, straight cash or commercial bail bond, while other options exist such as partially secured bonds, which only require a tenth of the full amount as a down payment, and unsecured bonds, which do not require any up front payment. The Court of Appeals ruled in 1991 that most people arrested must be released if they are not arraigned within 24 hours, and in 2013, for the first time since 2001, the average time it took to arraign defendants fell below 24 hours in all five boroughs of New York City. But there have been accusations of systematic trial delays, especially with regards to the New York City stop-and-frisk program. There have also been allegations that excessive pre-trial detention and systematic trial delays are used to pressure defendants to accept plea bargains.

In 2006 a commission appointed by Chief Judge Judith Kaye found that the county public defender system provided "an unconstitutional level of representation [...] impugning the fairness of New York's criminal justice system". The New York Civil Liberties Union has claimed that public defenders in New York are so overworked and overmatched that poor people essentially receive no legal aid in local criminal courts.

Some watchdog groups consider Brooklyn as one of America's most corrupt judicial systems. New York's judicial nominating conventions have been criticized as opaque, brief and dominated by county party leaders. When one New York judge brought an unsuccessful challenge to the constitutionality of the state's judicial nomination system to the U.S. Supreme Court, Justice John Paul Stevens wrote in a concurring opinion: "[A]s I recall my esteemed former colleague, Thurgood Marshall, remarking on numerous occasions: 'The Constitution does not prohibit legislatures from enacting stupid laws.'"

In her 1999 State of the Judiciary address, Chief Judge Judith Kaye called the system of New York trial courts "absurdly complex [...] difficult to understand, hard to navigate and a burden to administer" and endorsed a proposal for a two-tier trial court structure with a statewide Supreme Court and a series of regional district courts.

== History ==
Historically, county superior courts—like New York's county-by-county Supreme Court—were the highest level of trial court, overseeing a network of inferior trial courts (e.g., municipal courts, recorder's courts, courts of referees and commissioners), the decisions of which could be appealed within the trial court system to the superior courts.

The constitution of 1846 made several changes to the organization of the courts. The Court of Chancery was abolished and jurisdiction over equity was transferred to the Supreme Court. The Court for the Correction of Errors was abolished and jurisdiction over appeals was transferred to the Court of Appeals. The New York circuit courts, by the constitution of 1821, were abolished and replaced by the district benches of the Supreme Court. The Court of Appeals was established in July 1847, consisting of four statewide elected judges and four justices chosen annually from the Supreme Court.

The Court of Common Pleas had been established in 1686 in New York City, extended in 1691 throughout the state, had been again restricted to New York City in 1846, and was abolished in 1895. The Court for the Trial of Impeachments was established by the New York State Constitution of 1777 and was split from the Court for the Correction of Errors upon that court's disestablishment in 1846.

In 1961, constitutional changes to organize a unified court system were approved by the electorate. In 1962, several changes were implemented in statute. In 1977, several constitutional changes to the judiciary were approved by the electorate. In 1978, the nomination and regulation of judges and the administration of the courts was reorganized.

In 1999, electronic court filing (e-filing) was first authorized. In 2009, it was expanded and made permanent. In 2012, e-filing in superior criminal courts and Family Court was authorized. In 2015, authority for mandatory civil e-filing was made permanent, and appellate e-filing was authorized. In 2024, authorization was extended to all trial courts and classes of cases.

== See also ==
- Government of New York (state)
- Law enforcement in New York
- Law of New York

== General and cited references ==
- Gibson, Ellen M.; Manz, William H. (2004). Gibson's New York Legal Research Guide (PDF) (3rd ed.). Wm. S. Hein Publishing. ISBN 1-57588-728-2. LCCN 2004042477. OCLC 54455036.
- Local Government Handbook (PDF) (6th ed.). New York State Department of State. 2009. Archived from the original (PDF) on January 13, 2016.
- Galie, Peter J.; Bopst, Christopher (2012). The New York State Constitution (2nd ed.). Oxford University Press. ISBN 978-0-19-986056-2. LCCN 2011051555.
- Galie, Peter J. (1991). The New York State Constitution: A Reference Guide. Reference Guides to the State Constitutions of the United States. ABC-CLIO. ISBN 0-313-26156-3. LCCN 90-36627.
- NYSBA Committee on Legal Education and Admission to the Bar; NYSBA Membership Committee (September 2012). The Practice of Law in New York State: An Introduction For Newly-Admitted Attorneys (PDF). New York State Bar Association.
- Lincoln, Charles Z. (1906). The Constitutional History of New York. Lawyers Co-operative Publishing. OCLC 1337955.
