= Judicial Conference of the State of New York =

New York Judicial Administration Body

Agency overview
- Jurisdiction: New York
- Agency executive: Chief Judge of the State of New York
- Key document: Judiciary Law

The Judicial Conference of the State of New York is an institution of the New York State Unified Court System responsible for surveying current practice in the administration of the state's courts, compiling statistics, and suggesting legislation and regulations. Its members include the Chief Judge of the New York Court of Appeals and judges from the New York Supreme Court, Appellate Division.

== History ==
It was created in 1955 and codified at New York Judiciary Law article 7-A (§§ 214, 214-A). It is the successor body of the Judicial Council of the State of New York, which was abolished with the repeal of article 2-A of the Judiciary Law in Laws of 1955, ch. 869. That body was formed for the purpose of surveying current practice in the administration of the State's courts, compiling statistics, and suggesting legislation.
