= New York district courts =

Trial-level courts in New York

In the U.S. state of New York, district courts are state courts that are a type of trial court of inferior jurisdiction. They are established in Nassau County and the five western towns in Suffolk County. Each contains individual districts for civil cases which are organized along town lines, while criminal cases are heard in a separate countywide (in Nassau) or half-countywide (in Suffolk) district. They effectively replace town justice courts in these localities, but have subject-matter jurisdiction and operations similar to city courts.

They are not to be confused with the United States District Court for the Eastern District of New York, a federal court whose territorial jurisdiction includes the two Long Island counties as well as the city counties of Kings, Queens, and Richmond, or any of the other federal district courts in New York.

== Subject-matter jurisdiction ==
District Court is a local civil court and local criminal court. The court has subject-matter jurisdiction over civil matters seeking monetary damages up to $15,000, small-claims matters seeking monetary damages up to $5,000, and landlord and tenant matters. The criminal jurisdiction of the court includes trials over misdemeanors, violations, infractions, and traffic tickets charging a crime, and preliminary jurisdiction over felonies. This subject-matter jurisdiction is the same as the New York State city courts outside the City of New York.

== Organization ==
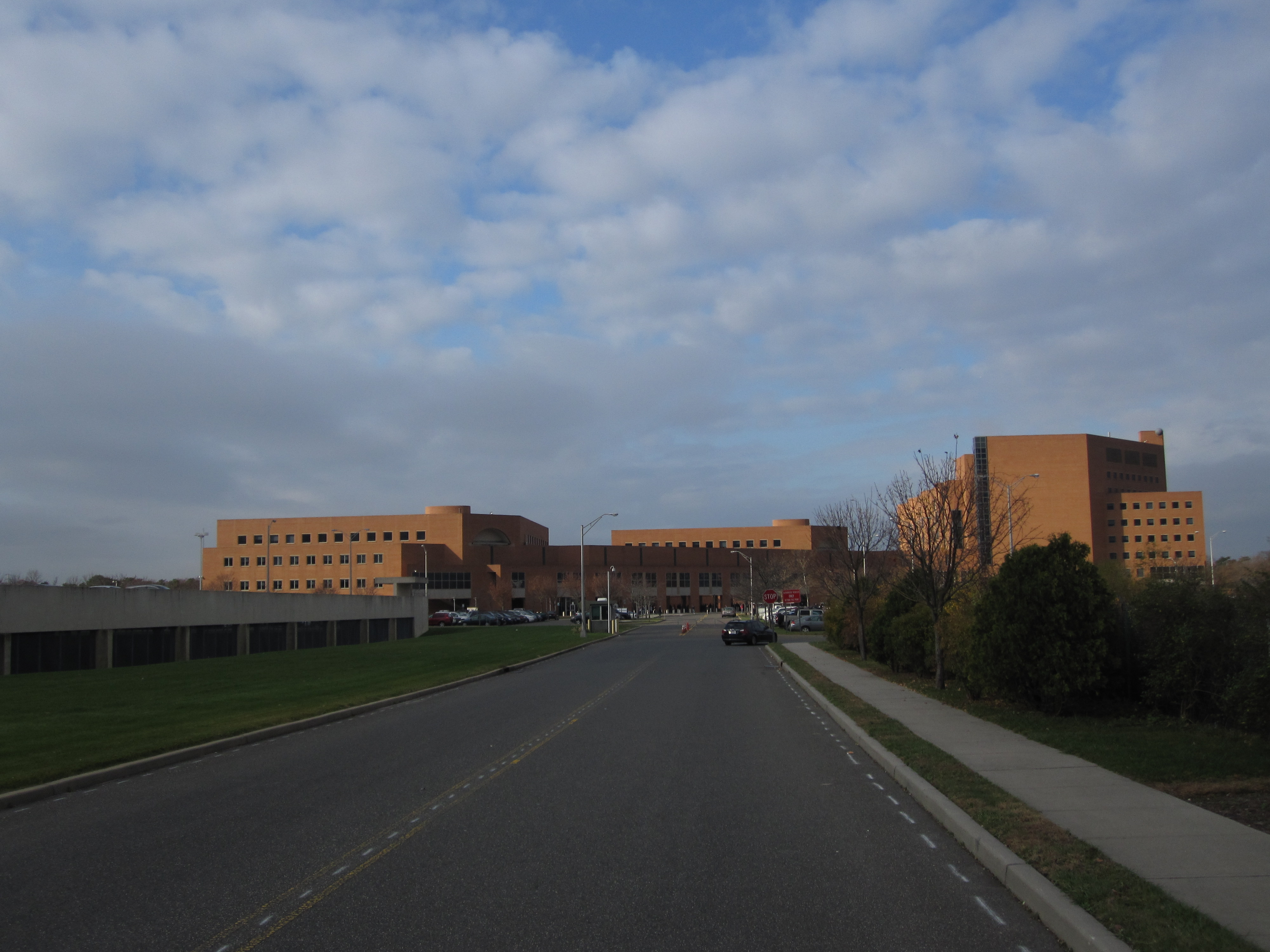
The Cohalan Court Complex in Central Islip is the site for criminal cases of the Suffolk County First District Court.

The Nassau County District Court is divided into four districts, all of which sit in Hempstead, New York. The first district covers criminal cases countywide. The other three districts cover civil cases, and are organized by town and city: the second covers Hempstead and Long Beach, the third covers North Hempstead, and the fourth covers Oyster Bay and Glen Cove.

The Suffolk County District Court is divided into six districts. The first, having a "central location", covers criminal cases in all five towns. The other five districts, having "outlying courthouses", are each coextensive with one of the towns, and have jurisdiction over civil matters, small claims, landlord and tenant matters, and town ordinances. The six districts are:

District	Towns covered	Courthouse location
First	Babylon Huntington Smithtown Islip Brookhaven	Cohalan Court Complex, Central Islip (criminal) Ronkonkoma (civil)
Second	Babylon	Lindenhurst
Third	Huntington	Huntington Station
Fourth	Smithtown	Hauppauge
Fifth	Islip	Ronkonkoma
Sixth	Brookhaven	Patchogue

These districts do not correspond to districts of the New York Supreme Court.

== Appeals ==
Appeals from the district court go to the Appellate Term of the New York Supreme Court for the Second Department.

== History ==
The Suffolk County District Court became active pursuant to the New York Uniform District Court Act in January 1964, replacing the town courts.
