= New York Court of Claims =

New York State court

The New York State Court of Claims is the court of the New York State Unified Court System which handles all claims against the State of New York and certain state agencies.

== Judges ==
Judges of the Court of Claims are appointed by the Governor of New York and confirmed by the State Senate for a 9-year term. While there are Judges of the Court of Claims who handle only claims against the state, there are many Judges of the Court of Claims who are appointed to this post and then assigned to serve as an Acting Justice of the New York State Supreme Court, generally in the criminal term of the court. This is done to increase the number of trial judges in the state for felony crimes, as it can be easier for Legislators to vote to increase the number of Court of Claims judges than Supreme Court Justices in view of differences in the manner of selecting the judges.

== History ==
Claims against the State of New York were originally heard and decided by the New York State Legislature. In 1874, a constitutional amendment was ratified which prohibited the Legislature from assessing claims against the State, and in 1876 the State Board of Audit (later renamed Board of Claims) was created to step in. In 1897, the Board of Claims was abolished and a Court of Claims, consisting of three judges, created instead. On July 31, 1911, the Court of Claims was abolished and the Board of Claims, consisting of three commissioners, was restored.

The present Court of Claims was re-established on January 28, 1915, to succeed the Board of Claims.

== See also ==
- United States Court of Federal Claims
