= New York State Judicial Institute =

Judicial Institute, New York

The New York State Judicial Institute serves as a statewide center for education, training, analysis, and research for all judges, justices, legal staff and employees of the New York State Unified Court System. It is located about 25 miles (40 km) north of New York City in White Plains, NY. It was created by a statute, which was most recently amended in 2024.

The building, completed in 2002, is the nation's first training and research facility for judges built for a state court system.

According to Pace University, the focus of the Institute is "that Unified Court System Judges remain current on developments in the law, the institute focuses its programs on emerging trends and cutting-edge issues." Through the Judiciary of New York, the institute was created with a unique partnership between the New York State Courts and Pace University School of Law.

Jurists from not only New York but also from around the world have traveled to the institute, to participate in programs and conferences. The institute also serves as a forum where judges, lawyers, and scholars from the state, the nation and the international community can convene for events as varied as a North American symposium on environmental law, whose cosponsors included the United Nations Environment Programme, and a "Partners in Justice" colloquium, where the judiciary, law school clinical programs, and the bar explored collateral consequences of criminal convictions and ways to improve indigent representation and access to the courts.

The building, operated by New York State Unified Court System personnel, is "a three-story-state-of-the-art facility of 30,000 square feet (2,800 m^{2}) and features a 160-seat auditorium, a multi-use lecture hall, classrooms, conference rooms, and a business center." It was designed by KD+G Architects.

== NY LEO Fellowship Program ==
The New York Legal Education Opportunity Program (NY LEO) is designed to prepare students entering law school with the tools needed for academic success in law school. The NY LEO Program assists minority, low-income and educationally disadvantaged college graduates in acquiring the fundamental and practical skills necessary to succeed in law school. The program is available to qualified candidates who will attend law school in New York.

The NY LEO Program is an intensive six-week summer program offered by the New York State Judicial Institute. All classes and activities are administered and implemented at the New York State Judicial Institute. Law professors provide instruction in first-year law school core courses, as well as in legal research, writing and analysis. As part of the program, students will have the opportunity to visit courts in session and meet with members of the judiciary and other legal professionals.
