= New York Family Court =

- Seal of the Unified Court System

Court overview
- Formed: September 1, 1962
- Jurisdiction: New York
- Court executive: deputy chief administrative judge; NYC deputy chief administrative judge
- Parent department: State Unified Court System
- Key document: Family Court Act

The Family Court of the State of New York is a specialized court of the New York State Unified Court System located in each county of the state. The New York City Family Court is the name given to the state Family Court within New York City.

It is a family court that hears cases involving children and families and handles issues such as child abuse and neglect, adoption, child custody and visitation, domestic violence, guardianship, juvenile delinquency, paternity, persons in need of supervision (PINS), child support, and termination of parental rights. In New York City, it has concurrent jurisdiction with the New York City Criminal Court for family offenses (domestic violence).

Family Court does not have jurisdiction over divorces, which must be litigated in the Supreme Court (which is a trial court, rather than the highest court which would be the New York Court of Appeals) and although Criminal Court domestic violence parts typically hear all cases involving crimes against intimate partners (whether opposite- or same-sex), New York law defines family offenses to include only those related by blood, actual marriage (common law marriage is not recognized in New York), or a child in common.

Unlike ordinary trial courts, there is no jury in family court. The cases are heard and decided by a judge. The aim of family court is to make decisions in the best interests of the child.

== Child protective proceedings ==
Child protective proceedings involve cases in which it appears that a child under 18 has been abused or neglected, or is in danger of being abused or neglected. A child protective agency may file a petition in Family Court requesting the court's assistance in protecting the child. The agency is the petitioner and the parent or caretaker is the respondent. In New York City, petitions are brought by the Administration for Children's Services (ACS).

Respondents may have the assistance of counsel at no cost if they cannot afford them. An attorney for the child (AFC) is assigned, usually from The Legal Aid Society or Lawyers for Children.

In an emergency, a child protective agency or the police may remove a child with or without a court order. If removed without a court order, respondents can request a "1028 hearing" be held within three court days. The agency must prove that a return home would present an imminent risk to the child's life or health, and the court must consider whether the agency made reasonable efforts to keep the child in the home. A "1027 hearing" can be requested by the agency before removal.

The court determines whether the allegations of abuse or neglect are true. If the parties do not reach an agreement, the court conducts a fact-finding hearing to determine whether the child has been abused or neglected. If the allegations are not proven, the petition is dismissed and the child is returned home. If the court finds that the child has been abused or neglected, a dispositional hearing is held to determine what should happen next. At the dispositional hearing, the court hears evidence and determines an outcome, which may include releasing the child to a parent under supervision, placing the child in foster care, issuing an order of protection, or granting custody or guardianship to a relative or other suitable person.

== Foster care ==
Foster care refers to the placement of a child in the care and custody of a social services official, such as the Administration for Children’s Services (ACS) in New York City or a local social services department elsewhere in the state, with day-to-day care provided by foster parents, relatives (kinship foster care), or residential programs. The transfer conveys care and custody of the child; the parent retains residual rights, including rights to visitation and participation in service and permanency planning, subject to court order.

A child may enter foster care in several ways. A parent or legal guardian may voluntarily place the child in foster care. The court may order placement as part of a child protective proceeding or a person in need of supervision (PINS) case. In emergencies, a child protective service may remove a child from the home when the child is in imminent danger and there is insufficient time to seek a court order.

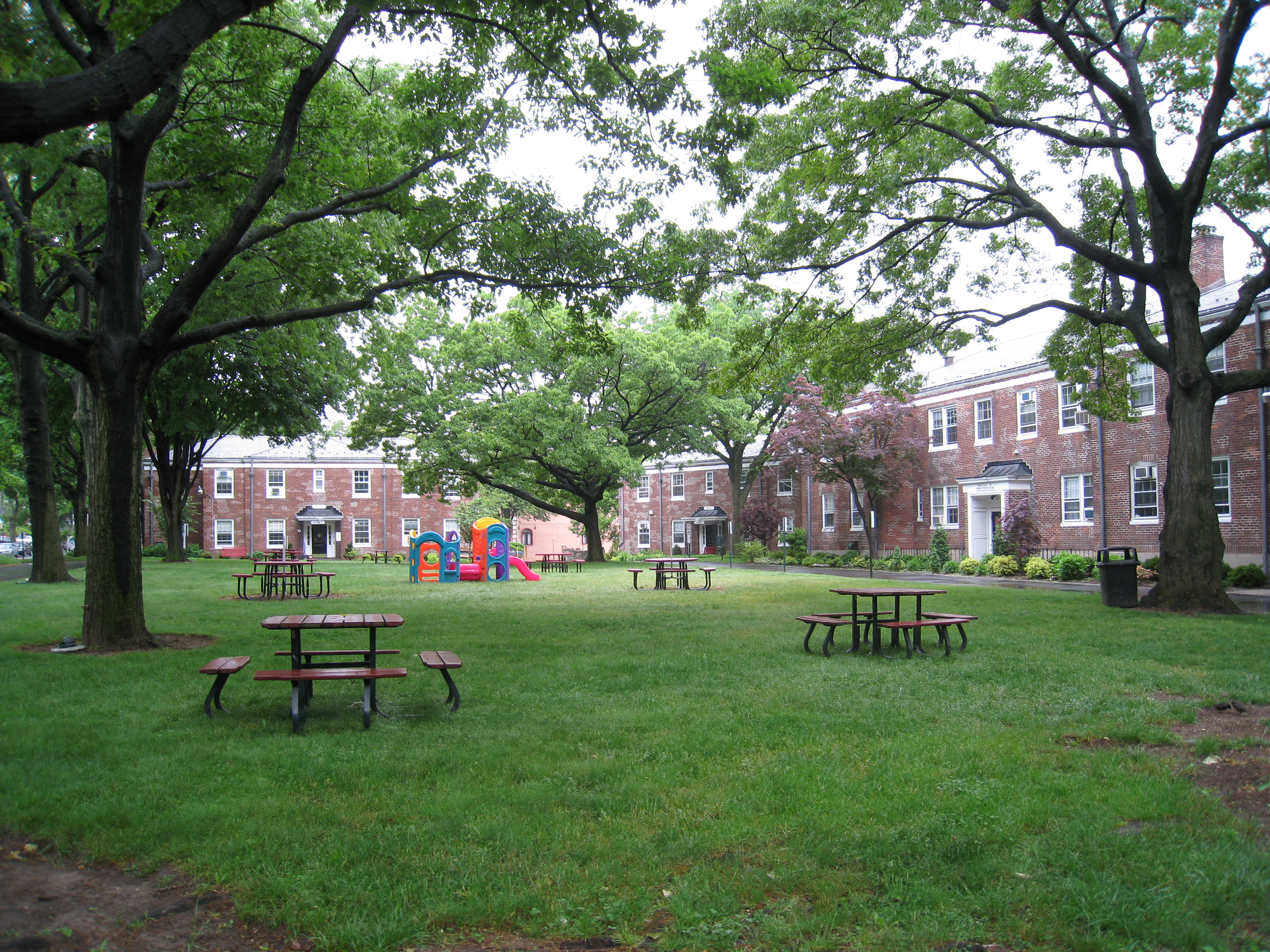
Forestdale in Forest Hills. Their campus hosts family time, not homes.

In a voluntary placement, a parent or guardian signs an agreement transferring the child’s care and custody to the social services official. When the official determines that the child is likely to remain in care for more than thirty days, the official must file a petition for court approval. The court determines whether the agreement was entered into knowingly and voluntarily, whether the parent is unable to make adequate provision for the child’s care at home, whether continuation in the home would be contrary to the welfare of the child, whether reasonable efforts were made, where appropriate, to prevent or eliminate the need for removal and to make it possible for the child to return home, and the anticipated duration of the placement.

Foster care placements are intended to be temporary. The Family Court retains continuing jurisdiction over the placement while the child remains in care, and the child may return to a parent or guardian when the court determines that return is consistent with the child’s best interests and safety. If return is not appropriate, the child may become eligible for adoption.

The court must conduct permanency hearings to review the status of the child and the progress of the case. The initial permanency hearing must be commenced no later than six months from the date that is sixty days after the child’s removal from the home, and must be completed within thirty days of that scheduled date. Subsequent permanency hearings are scheduled for a date certain no later than six months from the completion of the prior hearing, and must be completed within thirty days of that scheduled date. At each hearing, the court reviews the child’s condition, the parent’s progress toward reunification, and the agency’s efforts, and approves, modifies, or rejects the permanency goal. Permanency goals may include return to a parent, placement for adoption following termination of parental rights, referral for legal guardianship, permanent placement with a fit and willing relative, or, for a child age sixteen or older, another planned permanent living arrangement that includes a significant connection to an adult who is willing to be a permanency resource for the child, where the court finds compelling reasons that the other permanency goals are not in the child’s best interests.

If parents are unable or unwilling to resume care, they may voluntarily surrender their parental rights in a judicial proceeding to permit adoption. Alternatively, the agency may seek termination of parental rights through a separate proceeding in Family Court.

== Juvenile justice ==
Family Court has jurisdiction over proceedings to determine whether a person is a juvenile delinquent. For minors, most crimes like misdemeanors are heard in Family Court as juvenile delinquency. For juvenile offenders (13–15 years old), only specific enumerated felonies (e.g., murder, certain sexual or armed violent felonies) are heard in superior court (County Court or Supreme Court) youth parts, whereas for adolescent offenders (16–17 years old) all felonies are heard in superior court youth parts.

Family Court delinquency proceedings are civil in form rather than criminal trials. After a youth is arrested, they are detained and taken to court, or released with a desk appearance ticket directing them to appear at court in the future. A probation department intake process determines whether the case should be held for adjustment, such as restitution, community service, referral for community-based services, letter of apology, and/or mediation. Otherwise, the case is referred to a presentment agency (corporation counsel, county attorney, or district attorney) for the filing of a petition.

At the initial appearance, the child is assigned a lawyer and admits or denies the charges, and the probation department recommends they be sent home with a parent or guardian or remanded based on their risk assessment. If remanded, a probable cause hearing is held to determine if there is good reason for it. Alternatives to detention are used if they are sent home with a parent or guardian.

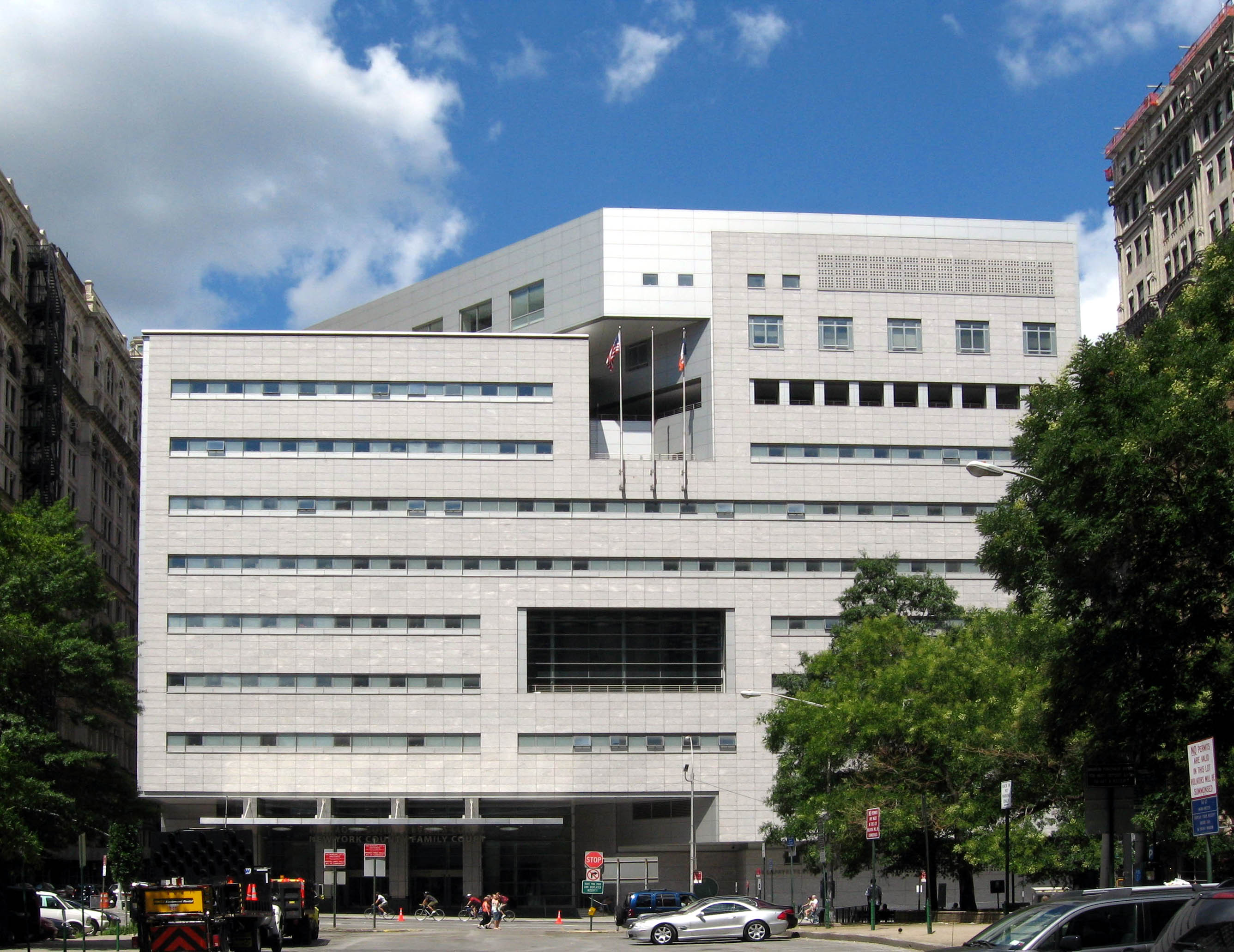
Manhattan Family Court

In juvenile delinquency cases, a fact-finding hearing is the trial. The presentment agency must prove its case by calling witnesses and showing other evidence; the respondent's lawyer may cross-examine the witnesses and also present their own witnesses and evidence. If the presentment agency proves the case beyond a reasonable doubt, the judge makes a finding that the respondent committed some or all of the acts described in the petition. If there is a finding, the probation department investigates the respondent's home and school behavior, and may order diagnostic assessments of their mental health.

At a dispositional hearing, the judge decides whether the respondent is a juvenile delinquent in need of supervision, treatment, or confinement (placement) and issues a dispositional order. The respondent, their parents or guardians, and other persons may testify. The judge decides what is best for the child and the community: ordering the respondent placed in a juvenile incarceration facility or in foster care; a conditional discharge, ordering them to live at home under certain conditions; order them to live at home under probation supervision, including alternative to placement program conditions; or adjourn in contemplation of dismissal. If they violate the dispositional order, the judge can order a different disposition, including placement in a juvenile incarceration facility.

== Administration ==
The Family Court Advisory and Rules Committee is one of the standing advisory committees established by the chief administrator of the courts that recommends changes to family law, court procedure, court rules, and uniform forms.

== Personnel ==
=== Judges ===
In the New York City Family Court (the "Family Court of the State of New York within the City of New York"), judges are appointed by the Mayor to ten-year terms; elsewhere they are elected to ten-year terms. There are 47 judges in the New York City Family Court.

In 1939, Justice Jane Bolin became the first black female judge in the United States when Mayor Fiorello La Guardia swore her in to the bench of the Family Court, then called the Domestic Relations Court. Her 10-year appointment was renewed by the city's mayors three times until she reached the mandatory retirement age of 70.

=== Other ===
A court attorney is a lawyer who works with and assists the judge by researching legal questions and helping to write decisions. The court attorney may also meet with the attorneys or parties to a case to try to reach an agreement without the need for a trial.

Referees hear custody, visitation, orders of protection, and foster care cases; private attorneys, judicial hearing officers, or court attorneys may be appointed.

Judicial Hearing Officers (JHOs) hear some family offense, custody, visitation, adoption, and voluntary placement foster care cases.

Support magistrates hear support cases (petitions filed seeking support for a child or spouse) and paternity cases (petitions filed requesting the court to enter an order declaring someone to be the father of a child).

== History ==
The NYC Domestic Relations part (commonly known as the Family Court) of the Magistrates' Court system created in 1910 had dealt with those chargeable with the support of wives, children and "poor relatives" under its criminal jurisdiction over "disorderly persons". The children's court part of the NYC Court of Special Sessions was created in 1915, from a 1902 children's court division of the New York County Court of General Sessions. Children's courts were authorized throughout the state by constitutional referendum in 1921 followed by statutes in 1922 and 1924. By 1933, jurisdiction was divided among the children's court, the magistrates' courts which dealt with deserting and nonsupporting husbands as "disorderly", the court of special sessions with jurisdiction in illegitimacy cases, the surrogate's court with jurisdiction in adoption cases, and the supreme court with divorce jurisdiction.

The NYC Children's Court and NYC Domestic Relations Court (commonly known as the Family Court) were consolidated into the Domestic Relations Court of the City of New York created on October 1, 1933. In 1962 the Family Court replaced these courts after a 1961 constitutional amendment. The Family Court Act was based more or less on the National Probation and Parole Association's Standard Family Court Act, not its Standard Juvenile Court Act or the Uniform Law Commission's Uniform Juvenile Court Act.

In 1955 the state acceded to the Interstate Compact on Juveniles, in 1956 the Interstate Compact on Mental Health, and in 1960 the Interstate Compact on the Placement of Children. In 1977 the state acceded to the Uniform Child Custody Jurisdiction Act, and in 2001 acceded to the successor Uniform Child Custody Jurisdiction and Enforcement Act.

From 2001–2003, the Universal Case Management System (UCMS) was implemented in all counties. In 2012, electronic court filing (e-filing) in the New York State Courts Electronic Filing System (NYSCEF) was authorized for six counties and select proceedings, mandatory only upon prior approval of the local presentment agencies, child protective agency, and family court bars. In 2024, e-filing authority was expanded to all counties and proceedings. In 2026, the consensual e-filing program was made permanent.

== See also ==
- New York State Office of Children and Family Services (OCFS)
- New York City Administration for Children's Services (ACS)
