= Multistate Professional Responsibility Examination =

Standardized test for attorneys

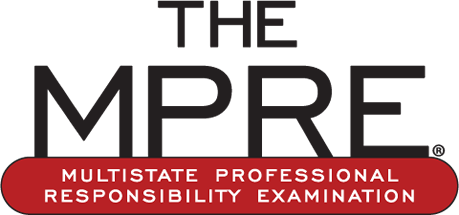
- Type: Computer based standardized test
- Administrator: National Conference of Bar Examiners
- Year started: 1980; 46 years ago
- Duration: 2 hours
- Offered: 3 times annually
- Regions: United States
- Languages: English
- Website: Official site

The Multistate Professional Responsibility Examination (MPRE) is a 120-minute, 60-question, multiple-choice examination designed to measure the knowledge and understanding of established standards related to a lawyer's professional conduct. It was developed by the National Conference of Bar Examiners and was first administered in 1980.

It is a prerequisite or corequisite to the bar examination for admission as an attorney at law in 49 of the 50 states of the United States, as well as the District of Columbia, Guam, the Northern Mariana Islands, the U.S. Virgin Islands, and the Republic of Palau. Of the 56 jurisdictions within the United States, only Puerto Rico, and Wisconsin do not use the MPRE. However, these jurisdictions still incorporate local professional responsibility rules in their respective bar examinations. Connecticut and New Jersey waive the MPRE requirement for bar candidates who have earned a grade of "C" and "C−", respectively, or better in a law school course in professional responsibility.

== Structure ==
Since the October 2012 administration, the test consists of 60 substantive questions. Only 50 are scored; the other 10 (randomly scattered throughout the exam) are used for experimental purposes. The raw score is converted to a "scaled score" based on the measured difficulty of the version of the test taken; the scaled score is used to determine passing scores. Scaled scores range between 50 and 150, with a median very close to 100.

The questions are based on the ABA Model Rules of Professional Conduct and the ABA Model Code of Judicial Conduct, as well as controlling constitutional decisions and generally accepted principles established in leading federal and state cases and in procedural and evidentiary rules (courtesy American Bar Association website and National Conference of Bar Examiners MPRE website). State rules and laws which may or may not differ from the ABA rules are not tested. California uses the MPRE even though it is the only jurisdiction that has not adopted either of the two sets of professional responsibility rules proposed by the American Bar Association – and California rules differ from the ABA rules in many ways. Despite California being the only state to not adopt the ABA's Model Rules of Professional Conduct or Judicial Conduct, it is one of the two states with the highest score requirement in the country.

The MPRE differs from the remainder of the bar examination in two ways:

- Virtually all states allow bar exam candidates to take the MPRE prior to graduation from law school, as opposed to the bar examination itself which, in the great majority of states, may only be taken after receipt of a J.D. or L.L.M. from an ABA-accredited law school.
- A bar exam candidate's MPRE score is accepted in every jurisdiction that requires it, unlike the other components of the bar examination.

== Passing score ==
The passing score varies between jurisdictions. The lowest score accepted by any jurisdiction is 75 (several). The highest required by any state is 86 (Utah and California).

All states have a window either preceding or surrounding the bar exam outside of which MPRE scores are not recognized.

Passing Scores (in 2021) by State:

| Alabama | 75 | Georgia | 75 | Maryland^{V} | 85 | New Jersey | 75 | South Carolina | 77 | Wyoming ^{U} | 85 |
| Alaska | 80 | Hawaii | 85 | Massachusetts | 85 | New Mexico | 80 | South Dakota | 85 | Guam | 80 |
| Arizona | 85 | Idaho | 85 | Michigan | 85^{S} | New York | 85 | Tennessee | 82 | N. Mariana Islands | 75 |
| Arkansas | 85 | Illinois | 80 | Minnesota | 85 | North Carolina | 80 | Texas | 85 | Palau | 75 |
| California | 86 | Indiana | 80 | Mississippi | 75 | North Dakota | 85 | Utah | 86 | Puerto Rico | NA |
| Colorado | 85 | Iowa | 80 | Missouri | 80 | Ohio | 85 | Vermont | 80 | Virgin Islands | 75 |
| Connecticut | 80 | Kansas | 80 | Montana | 80 | Oklahoma | 80 | Virginia | 85 | | |
| Delaware | 85 | Kentucky | 80 | Nebraska | 85 | Oregon | 85 | Washington | 85 | | |
| DC | 75 | Louisiana | 80 | Nevada | 85 | Pennsylvania | 75 | West Virginia | 80^{T} | | |
| Florida | 80 | Maine | 80 | New Hampshire | 79 | Rhode Island | 80 | Wisconsin | NA | | |

== Notes ==
S.Michigan increased to 85, starting with those individuals taking the July 2009 bar examination: https://web.archive.org/web/20091215134646/http://courts.michigan.gov/supremecourt/BdofLawExaminers/FAQ.htm
T.West Virginia increased a passing score to 80 effective January 1, 2013: http://www.courtswv.gov/legal-community/court-rules/Orders/2012/11-20-2012Admission-Prac-of-Law.pdf
U.Wyoming increased from 70 to 85, starting with those individuals taking the 2013 MPRE: https://web.archive.org/web/20120802160635/http://www.wyomingbar.org/pdf/admissions/Frequently_Asked_Admissions_Questions.pdf
V.Maryland began requiring the MPRE as of March 1, 2019: http://www.ncbex.org/exams/mpre/
