= Civil Practice Law and Rules =

Chapter of the Consolidated Laws of New York

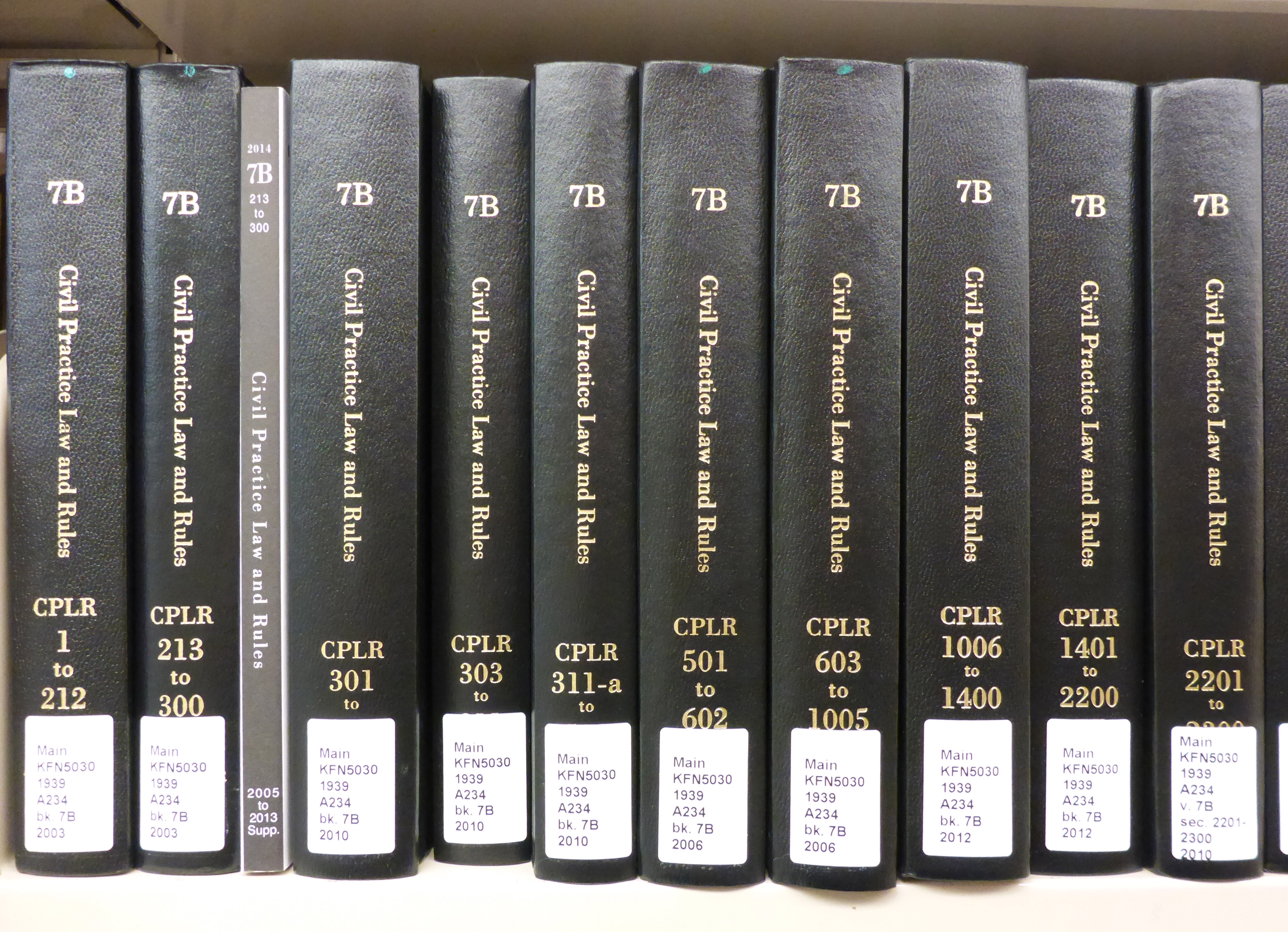
Volumes of the McKinney's annotated version of the CPLR

The New York Civil Practice Law and Rules (CPLR) is chapter 8 of the Consolidated Laws of New York and governs legal procedure in the Unified Court System such as jurisdiction, venue, and pleadings, as well certain areas of substantive law such as the statute of limitations and joint and several liability. The CPLR has approximately 700 individual sections and rules which are divided into 70 articles. A committee of the New York State Bar Association, the Committee on Civil Practice Law and Rules, monitors the law and periodically proposes amendments.

== History ==
The 1846 New York State Constitution directed the appointment of a commission to simplify and modernize the arcane system of writs and pleadings, and the Field Code (after commissioner David Dudley Field II) was enacted by the Legislature on April 12, 1848. The CPLR was enacted in 1962.

== See also ==
- Law of New York
