= New York City courts =

Court system

The New York City court system consists of the several citywide and state courts.

== Courts ==
There are two city courts, the Criminal Court and the Civil Court, and several state courts, the Supreme Court, Surrogate's Court, and Family Court. Unlike the rest of New York, counties within New York City do not have a typical County Court.

=== Criminal Court ===
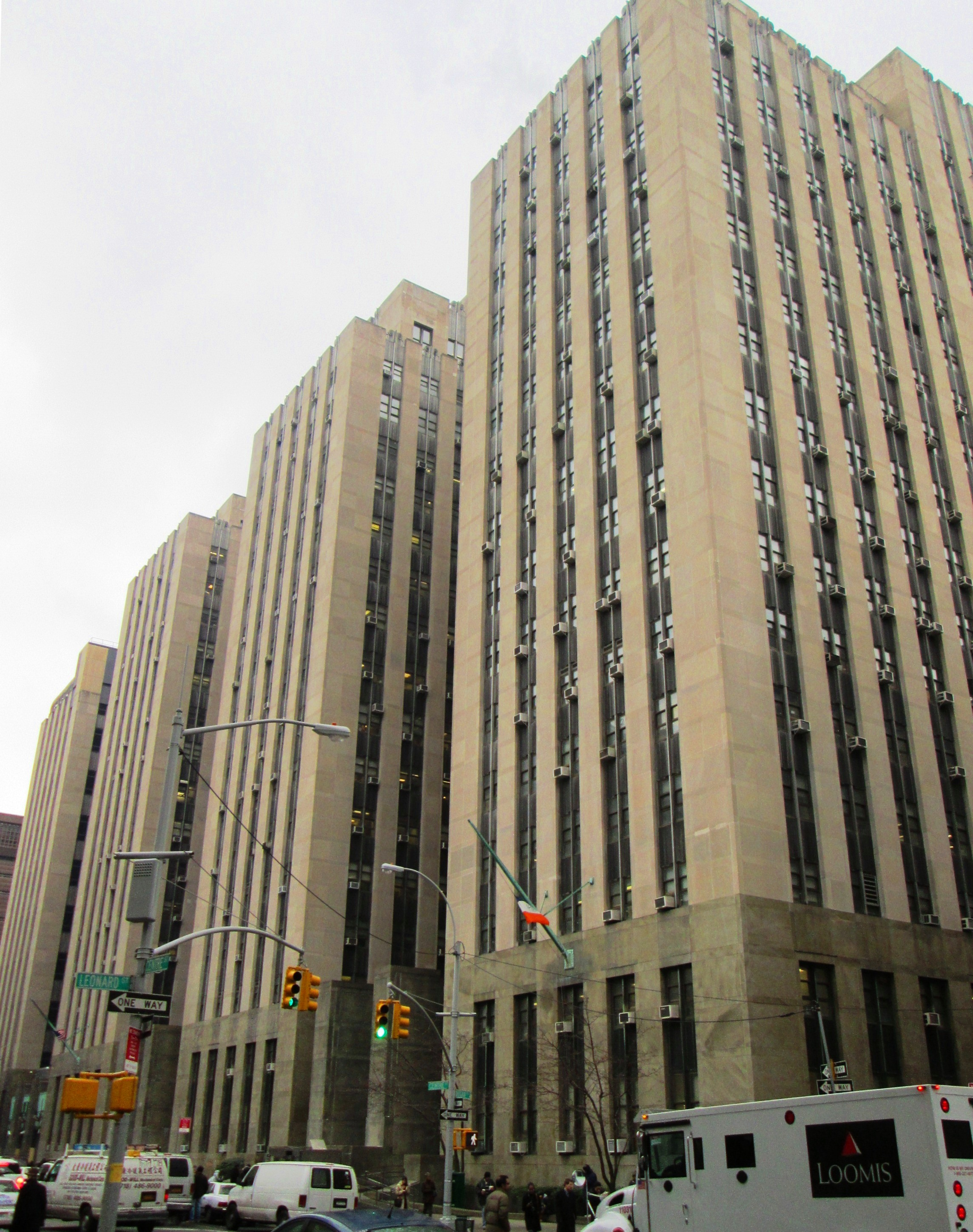
The New York County Criminal Courts Building in Manhattan

The Criminal Court of the City of New York handles misdemeanors (generally, crimes punishable by fine or imprisonment of up to one year) and lesser offenses, and also conducts arraignments (initial court appearances following arrest) and preliminary hearings in felony cases (generally, more serious offenses punishable by imprisonment of more than one year).

=== Civil Court ===
The Civil Court of the City of New York decides lawsuits involving claims for damages up to $25,000 and includes a small claims part for cases involving amounts up to $5,000 as well as a housing part for landlord-tenant matters, and also handles other civil matters referred by the Supreme Court. It handles about 25% of all the New York courts' total filings.

=== Supreme Court ===
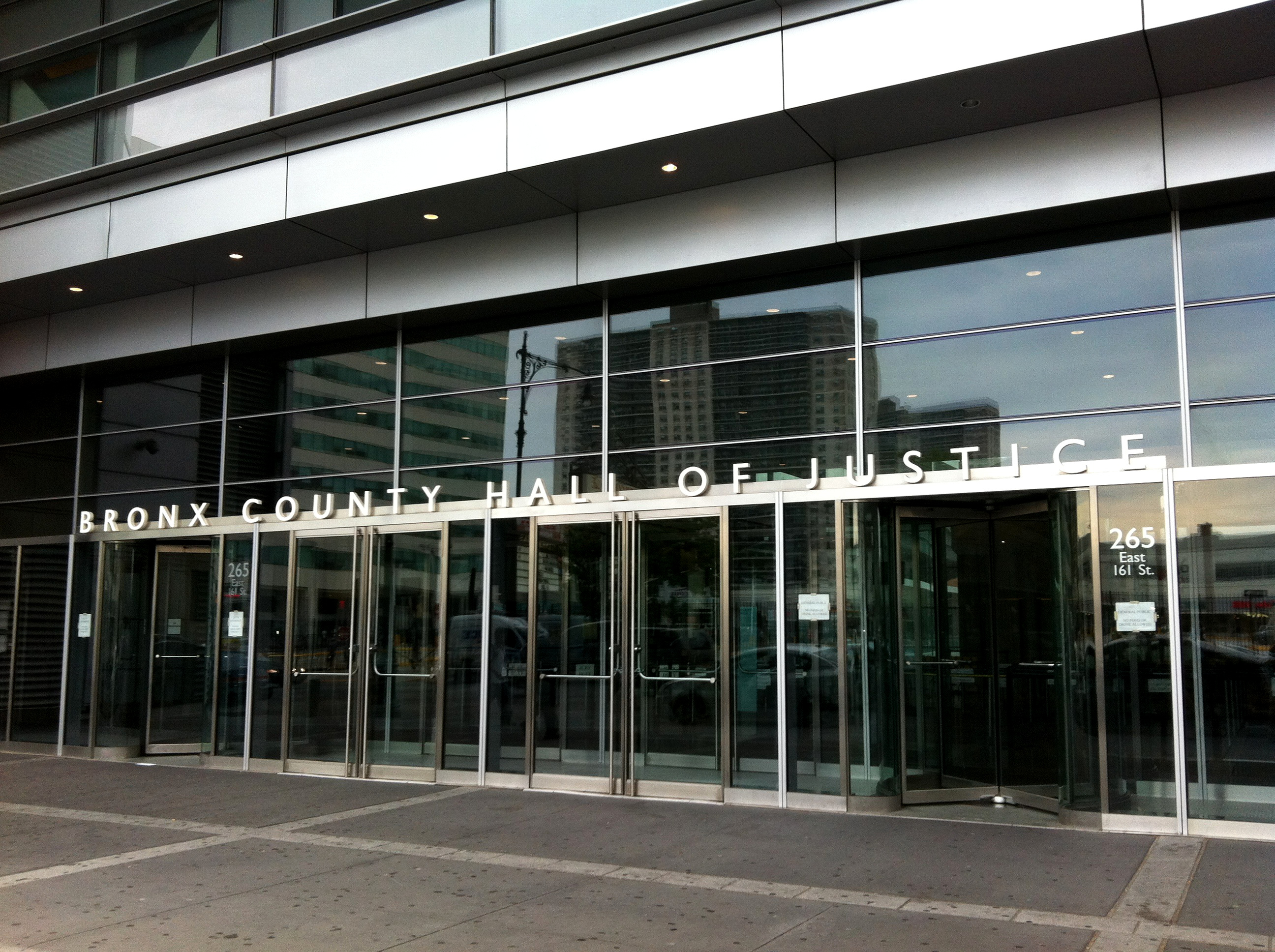
The Bronx County Hall of Justice in the Bronx

The Supreme Court of the State of New York is radically different from similarly named courts in nearly all other states. It is the trial court of general jurisdiction, not the highest court in the state. In New York City, there are five venues for Supreme Court, one in each of New York City's five counties, which hear felony cases and major civil cases. Lesser criminal and civil cases are heard in the Criminal Court and Civil Court, respectively.

=== Surrogate's Court ===
The Surrogate's Court of the State of New York is the probate court which oversees the probate of wills and administers estates. Each Surrogate's Court is located in each of New York City's five counties (boroughs).

=== Family Court ===
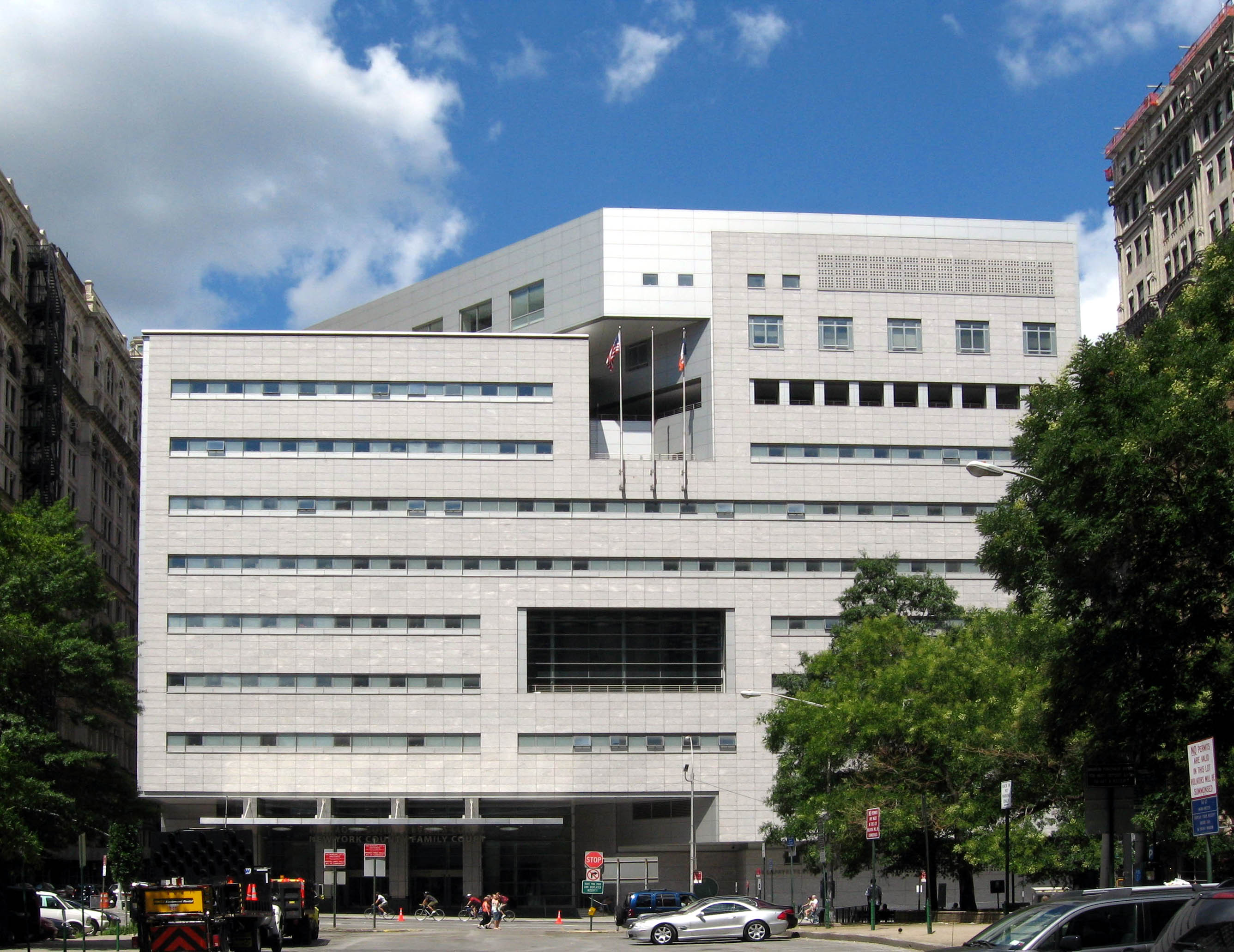
The Family Court building in Manhattan

The Family Court of the State of New York is a family court that hears cases involving children and families and handles issues such as child abuse and neglect (child protection), adoption, child custody and visitation, domestic violence, guardianship, juvenile delinquency, paternity, persons in need of supervision (PINS), and child support. The New York City Family Court ("Family Court of the State of New York within the City of New York") is located in each of New York City's five counties (boroughs).

=== Other tribunals ===
The Traffic Violations Bureau (TVB) is a part of the New York State Department of Motor Vehicles that adjudicates non-criminal traffic violations (other than parking violations) in New York City and Rochester.

The New York City Office of Administrative Trials and Hearings (OATH) is an independent agency of the New York city government that conducts administrative court hearings, overseeing the operations of four tribunals: the OATH Tribunal, the Environmental Control Board, the Health Tribunal, and the Taxi & Limousine Tribunal.

== Administration ==
The state court system is divided into thirteen judicial districts (JDs), with five JDs in New York City, one for each county/borough. The Deputy Chief Administrator for the New York City Courts (or Deputy Chief Administrative Judge if a judge) is responsible for overseeing the day-to-day operations of the trial-level courts located in New York City, and works with the Administrators of the various courts in New York City in order to allocate and assign judicial and nonjudicial personnel resources to meet the needs and goals of those courts. An Administrator (or Administrative Judge if a judge) supervises each city court, the state Family Court within the city, and state civil or criminal courts (or both) within each JD (county/borough). Administrators are assisted by Supervising Judges who are responsible in the on-site management of the trial courts, including court caseloads, personnel, and budget administration, and each manage a particular type of court within a county or judicial district.

== Judges ==
New York City Criminal Court judges are appointed by the Mayor of New York City to 10-year terms from a list of candidates submitted by the Mayor's Advisory Committee on the Judiciary. New York City Civil Court judges are elected from districts to 10-year terms, with vacancies filled by the mayor and service continuing until the last day of December after next election, while Housing Part judges are appointed by the Chief Administrative Judge to five-year terms. Judges of the Surrogate's Court are elected for 14-year terms. Judges of the Family Court are appointed by the Mayor to 10-year terms.

Once a judge is appointed, they can be transferred from one court to another by the Office of Court Administration, and after two years' service in the lower courts, they may be designated by the Chief Administrator of the Courts upon consultation and agreement with the presiding justice of the appropriate Appellate Division as an Acting Supreme Court Justice with the same jurisdiction as a Supreme Court Justice.

== See also ==
- Judiciary of New York
