= Krimstock hearing =

A sample of the required "Vehicle Seizure" form giving notice to vehicle owners of their right to a prompt Krimstock hearing.

A Krimstock hearing is an administrative law proceeding that offers vehicle owners the opportunity to recover possession of a vehicle confiscated by the New York City Police Department (NYPD) during an arrest. Police have authority to impound vehicles used as an instrument of a crime, and later to seek permanent ownership of these vehicles in civil forfeiture actions. Such forfeiture actions, like the Krimstock administrative hearings, are entirely separate from any criminal charges the vehicle owner may face stemming from his or her arrest.

At the hearing, the NYPD must demonstrate (1) that it followed proper procedure in arresting the person and taking the vehicle, (2) that it is likely to win the civil forfeiture action, and (3) that returning the vehicle would cause a danger to the public. If the NYPD fails to demonstrate one of these three things, the vehicle is returned to its owner pending the outcome of the separate civil forfeiture action.

The Krimstock hearing process was ordered into creation by the United States Court of Appeals for the Second Circuit in a 2002 opinion authored by Judge Sonia Sotomayor (who later became a justice of the U.S. Supreme Court). The hearings are remarkable because they are a recent example of an entirely new, judicially created, procedural due process right. The hearings are conducted by the New York City Office of Administrative Trials and Hearings (OATH) and presided over by New York City administrative law judges. In 2003, the New York State Court of Appeals mandated that similar hearings be conducted in Nassau County, Long Island.

== Origin ==
The NYPD began seizing vehicles upon the arrest of the driver in the 1980s pursuant to a city ordinance that allowed for such forfeiture when the vehicle was used as an instrument of a crime. Vehicles were regularly confiscated from people charged with both misdemeanors and felonies, ranging from drug possession and solicitation of prostitution to illegal gun possession. Unlike the older New York State civil forfeiture statute, the NYC law did not provide for any type of prompt due process hearing. Vehicles were held for months and even years while owners waited for the NYPD to bring civil forfeiture actions. The vast majority of the time, however, these forfeiture actions never came. In 1998, for example, of the 1,800 vehicles seized, less than one percent went to trial. In 1999, the NYPD added driving while intoxicated (DWI) to the list of crimes that they would impound vehicles for, resulting in thousands of additional seizures.

In 2000, the Special Litigation Unit of The Legal Aid Society brought a class action lawsuit on behalf of a number of vehicle owners who had been waiting years for the return of their vehicles. One of those vehicle owners, a named plaintiff on behalf of the lawsuit's certified class, was Valerie Krimstock. Her name became part of the title of that lawsuit, Krimstock v. Kelly — hence the name "Krimstock hearings." In 2002, the Second Circuit heard the case. The majority opinion was written by Sonia Sotomayor.

Sotomayor wrote that under the Due Process Clause of the Fourteenth Amendment, vehicle owners have a right "to ask what ‘justification’ the NYPD has for retention of their vehicles during the pendency of proceedings, and to put that question to the NYPD at an early point after seizure in order to minimize any arbitrary or mistaken encroachment upon plaintiffs' use and possession of their property."

The Second Circuit applied the three-part balancing test of Mathews v. Eldridge. It reasoned that: (1) a significant private interest was affected considering the length of the retention and given that vehicles are "often central to a person's livelihood or daily activities"; (2) the risk of erroneous deprivation was great considering that NYPD's pecuniary interest and the fact that no compensation was paid for the depreciation and replacement costs of vehicles erroneously held; and (3) the Government's interest in the vehicles not being sold or destroyed pending the forfeiture proceeding could be satisfied by "less drastic measures than continued impoundment," including bond or a restraining order.

In consultation with the parties, the United States District Court for the Southern District of New York chose OATH, a tribunal in the executive branch of NYC government, which adjudicates matters for a variety of NYC agencies, as the location for the new Krimstock hearings. By 2004, when the hearing began, the NYPD held over 6,000 vehicles in "legal limbo."

Through the continuing advocacy of The Legal Aid Society, the Krimstock hearing process has been refined and the original Krimstock order and judgment has been twice amended by the United States District Court for the Southern District of New York.

== The Krimstock process ==
Procedures for Krimstock-compliant hearings is outlined in the Third Amended Krimstock Order. For seizures by police in New York City, procedure is further directed by New York City OATH Rules of Practice and precedent from previous Krimstock decisions. The Center for New York City Law at New York Law School keeps an archive of OATH decisions, including Krimstock decisions.

Return of a vehicle pursuant to a Krimstock hearing is temporary. Whether the vehicle is ultimately recovered or surrendered to police is determined at civil forfeiture proceedings in New York State Supreme Court.

=== Beginning the Krimstock process ===
Upon seizing a vehicle, police must provide to the owner of the impounded vehicle a "Vehicle Seizure Form". This form provides instructions for vehicle owners on how to request a Krimstock hearing. (All vehicle owners are entitled to a hearing, but hearings are scheduled only when an owner requests one.) Vehicle owners must attend the hearing. Unlike criminal proceedings, asset forfeiture proceedings are a civil matter; accordingly, vehicle owners are not entitled to a state-appointed attorney. Vehicle owners have the option of retaining a private attorney, but many represent themselvespro se. OATH attempts to provide assistance for pro se owners, including a detailed how-to website created in 2011 in conjunction with the Lawyering in the Digital Age Clinic at Columbia University School of Law. It also makes referrals to potential pro-bono representation.

=== The settlement conference ===
At a Krimstock hearing, an administrative judges conducts an informal settlement conference between the government attorney and the vehicle owner. Depending on the severity of the criminal charges, the police may offer to return the vehicle and cancel the civil forfeiture action subject to certain conditions. If, for example, the vehicle owner was arrested for DWI and there are no aggravating factors, the NYPD may agree to return the vehicle if the owner completes a treatment program. Or, as another example, if the vehicle owner was not in the vehicle at the time it was seized and did not know that it was being used for criminal activity, the NYPD may return the vehicle as long as the owner promises not to lend the vehicle to the arrested driver again.

=== The hearing ===
The hearing is conducted in what looks like a standard court room. Both the NYPD and the vehicle owner are entitled to call witnesses and present evidence. Rules of evidence a Krimstock hearing are less strict than a criminal or civil trial. Hearsay evidence, if deemed reliable, is admissible. Accordingly, police may introduce the police report without having a police officer testify in person. Vehicle owners are not required to testify, but administrative judges are allowed to draw a negative inference from an owner's silence. Owners are free to decide to testify about some issues, but remain silent about others.

=== The government's burden at the hearing ===
At the hearing, the burden is on government—the police—to show why the vehicle should remain impounded pending the outcome of the civil forfeiture action.

The police must demonstrate that the vehicle owner was served proper notice of the Krimstock hearing. Drivers receive a Vehicle Seizure Form at the time of arrest. A second form is mailed to the vehicle owner within 5 days of the arrest.

The NYPD must also convince the administrative law judge that it is more likely than not that:

1. The NYPD had probable cause to stop the vehicle and arrest the person inside. If the NYPD claims contraband was found in the vehicle, the NYPD must show that there existed probable cause to search the vehicle as well.
2. The vehicle was used as the instrumentality of a crime, and, accordingly, the NYPD has a likelihood of winning the civil forfeiture proceeding in state court and obtain permanent confiscation of the vehicle.
3. Returning the vehicle would make the public less safe.

== National impact ==
In Alvarez v. Smith, the absence of Krimstock-like interim hearings under an Illinois forfeiture statute was challenged in the Supreme Court of the United States. Upon learning that seized property had been returned, the Supreme Court determined that there was no longer a case or controversy to be ruled on and, accordingly, declined to set a national rule on when Krimstock-like interim hearings are required by due process.

== See also ==
- Law of New York
- Judiciary of New York
