= Traffic Violations Bureau =

New York State administrative court

Court overview
- Formed: May 26, 1969
- Jurisdiction: New York City
- Parent department: Dept. of Motor Vehicles
- Key document: Vehicle and Traffic Law

The Traffic Violations Bureau (TVB) is an administrative court of the New York State Department of Motor Vehicles that adjudicates non-criminal traffic violations (other than parking violations) in New York City.

== Proceedings ==
The TVB conducts its proceedings according to the Administrative Adjudication of Traffic Violations regulations in the New York Codes, Rules and Regulations. The National Motorists Association assists motorists and offers attorney referrals to motorists appearing before the TVB.

The DMV TVB is an administrative court that is not part of the judiciary, but an executive agency with different procedures regarding elements ranging from rules of evidence to threshold for conviction. The function of the judge is carried out by an administrative law judge, or ALJ. The sole options are to plead guilty or not guilty: plea bargains are not conducted, nor can the judge reduce a charge, only rule guilty or not guilty on the stated charge. After a guilty finding, the DMV ALJ may impose any penalty authorized by the Vehicle and Traffic Law, including suspension or revocation of a driver's license and/or motor vehicle registration, but not including imprisonment. There is no absolute right to a supporting deposition, and rules on admissibility of hearsay evidence are far more lax than in court. Typically, the hearing consists simply of each side presenting its story, the allowance of hearsay negating the necessity of formalities such as sworn witnesses and the like.

Administrative appeals are made to the DMV Motor Vehicle Appeals Board. There is a fee of $10 for the appeal and $50 for the transcript that must be ordered. Judicial review of the appeal is made under article 78 of the Civil Practice Law and Rules, which is equivalent to a writ or order of certiorari, mandamus and/or prohibition.

== Criticisms ==
Because the rules of evidence, specifically the right of discovery and the admissibility of hearsay, are more lax than in normal court, the TVB system has often been characterized as a difficult or biased one. The absence of an option to plead to reduced charges, traditionally a staple of traffic court, has been especially criticized.

The threshold of conviction is "clear and convincing evidence", in contrast to the general definition of proof beyond a reasonable doubt. This is a lower standard, making conviction easier. Conversely, the argument has been made that the more streamlined process, coupled with the judge being an expert on traffic law, makes for a fairer trial. The concept of administration adjudication was upheld by New York State's highest court, the Court of Appeals, in Rosenthal v. Hartnett, 36 N.Y.2d 269 (1975).

The New York State Department of Motor Vehicles has in the past noted that a 65% conviction rate is required to maintain the financial viability of the Traffic Violations Bureau System (Source: New York State Bar Association Committee on Administrative Adjudication).

== History ==
The TVB is authorized by Vehicle and Traffic Law article 2-A, which was created by chapter 1074 of the laws of 1969 (enacted May 26, 1969, effective July 1, 1970) under Governor Rockefeller. The rationale behind the establishment of this office was to offload the large volume of such cases from the New York City Criminal Court, and also authorized local parking violations bureaus.

Effective April 1, 2013, the Suffolk County Traffic and Parking Violations Agency began adjudicating parking summonses, red light camera citations and moving violations in the five western towns of Suffolk County. Effective July 1, 2015, the Buffalo TVB closed. Effective April 21, 2018 the Rochester TVB closed.

== See also ==
- New York City Parking Violations Bureau
- New York City Office of Administrative Trials and Hearings
