= Traffic court =

Judicial process

Traffic court is a specialized judicial process for handling traffic ticket cases. In the United States, people who are given a citation by a police officer can plead guilty and pay the indicated fine directly to the court house, by mail, or on the Internet. A person who wishes to plead not guilty or otherwise contest the charges is required to appear in court on the predetermined date on the citation, where they may argue before the judge or negotiate with the prosecutor before being called to appear in front of the judge. Most prosecutors will not negotiate with someone who does not have a lawyer. The person may also request a trial by a written declaration in the following states: California, Florida, Hawaii, Indiana, Louisiana, Nebraska, Ohio, Oregon, and Wyoming. In the case of a trial by written declaration, the accused does not have to be present in the courtroom; they may just explain the reason to defense for the case. Officers are required to turn in their declaration. The judge will then make a decision based on the declarations and evidence from both sides. After the written trial, the accused is allowed to request a new in-person hearing if they are not satisfied with the outcome of the written trial, by filing a trial de novo request.

More serious charges, such as a DUI or instances where the person in question may be responsible for injuries to another, may require the person to appear in court regardless of their plea. Some municipalities process guilty pleas of this nature without the presence of an actual judge, whereas others may require one to appear in court. Often these charges are handled by the larger criminal court.

Each state handles traffic matters in its own way. In most of New York State, for example, traffic matters are heard in the court for the city, town, or village where the alleged violation happened. The town and village courts are known as Justice Courts. Each municipality is free to decide how to handle traffic cases. A similar process is followed in Tennessee, though many southern states have varying procedures for paying the fine as a form of pleading guilty. New York City traffic matters (and those of a few other locations) are heard in a special court called Traffic Violations Bureau, with a very different process. New Jersey handles traffic matters in the Municipal Court System, with the most serious cases heard in Superior Court. In Virginia, traffic court is general district court and speeding as low as 86 mph in a 70 is misdemeanor reckless driving. In Washington, D.C., traffic tickets are handled by the Department of Motor Vehicles. In California, tickets are handled in Superior Court. Massachusetts tickets are heard in District Courts. In the City of Chicago, traffic tickets issued by Chicago Police Officers with no possibility of jail time are handled by the City's Law Department, frequently by law students. All other traffic violations (including those issued by state police) are dealt with by the Cook County State's Attorney.
