= People v. Sandoval =

1974 opinion by the Court of Appeals of the State of New York

People v. Sandoval is a 1974 opinion by the Court of Appeals of the State of New York that "trial court must balance the 'probative worth of evidence of prior specific criminal, vicious or immoral acts on the issue of the defendant's credibility on the one hand, and on the other the risk of unfair prejudice to the defendant'". (Court citations: People v. Sandoval, 34 N.Y.2d 371, 357 N.Y.S.2d 849, 314 N.E.2d 413 (N.Y. 1974)).

Sandoval pre-trial hearings (the procedure is unique to New York state) allow the accused to make an informed decision as to whether to testify given that it sets the scope of cross-examination. A presumably probative result of a Sandoval hearing has been termed "a Sandoval".
