= Chief Administrator of the Courts =

The New York State Chief Administrator of the Courts (or Chief Administrative Judge of the Courts if a judge) oversees the administration and operation of the New York State Unified Court System. They are appointed by the Chief Judge of New York with the advice and consent of the Administrative Board of the Courts. They are assisted by the Office of Court Administration.

== List of Chief Administrative Judges ==
Recent Chief Administrative Judges:

- Richard J. Bartlett, 1974–1979
- Herbert B. Evans, 1979–1983
- Robert J. Sise, 1983–1985
- Joseph W. Bellacosa, 1985–1987
- Albert M. Rosenblatt, 1987–1989
- Matthew T. Crosson, 1989–1993
- E. Leo Milonas, 1993–1995
- Jonathan Lippman, 1996–2007
- Ann Pfau, 2007–2011
- A. Gail Prudenti, 2011–2015
- Lawrence K. Marks, 2015–present
