= List of New York City government agencies =

In the government of New York City, the heads of about 50 city departments are appointed by the mayor, who also appoints several deputy mayors to oversee entire city agencies and handle specific tasks and projects within their designated portfolios.

The list below is not comprehensive, and there are many smaller agencies, departments, and mayoral offices, some of which exist only for a limited period of time.

== Mayoral ==
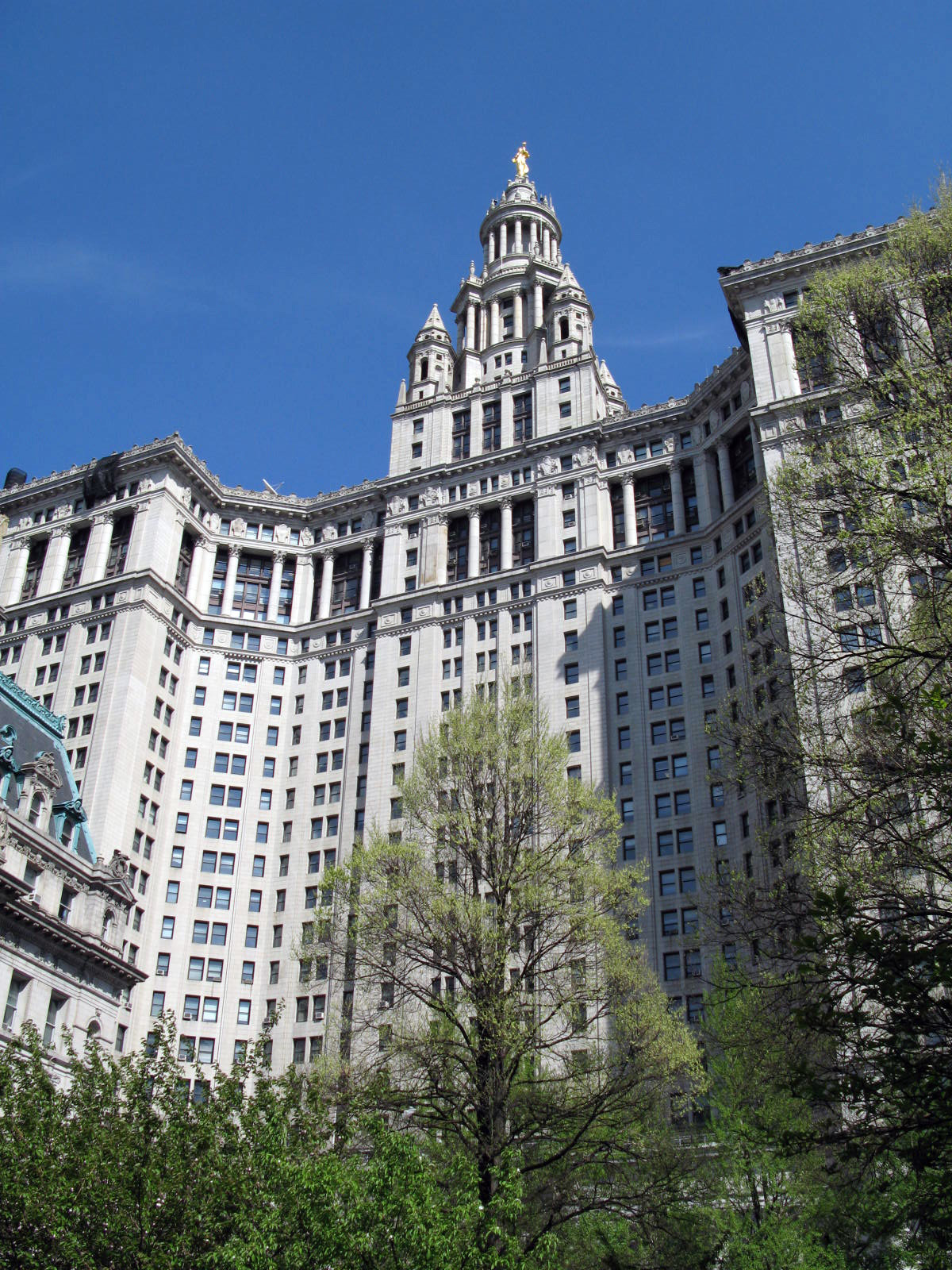
The Municipal Building, home to many city agencies, and one of the largest government office buildings in the world

- The Department for the Aging (DFTA) provides support and information for older people (those over 60).
- The Department of Buildings (DOB) enforces building codes and zoning regulations, issues building permits, and inspects new and existing buildings.
- The Business Integrity Commission (BIC) regulates the private carting industry, businesses operating in the City's public wholesale markets, and the shipboard gambling industry.
- The Administration for Children's Services (ACS) protects and promotes safety and well-being of New York City's children and families by providing child welfare, juvenile justice, and early care and education services.
- The Department of City Planning (DCP) sets the framework of city's physical and socioeconomic planning.
- The Department of Citywide Administrative Services (DCAS) supports City agencies' workforce needs in recruiting, hiring and training City employees; provides overall facilities management for 55 public buildings; purchases, sells and leases real property; purchases, inspects and distributes supplies and equipment; establishes, audits and pays utility accounts that serve more than 4,000 buildings; and implements energy conservation programs throughout City facilities.
- The Department of Consumer and Worker Protection (DCWP), formerly the Department of Consumer Affairs (DCA) enforces consumer protection laws, licenses businesses, deals with consumer complaints, participates in consumer education, as well as workplace safety, paid sick leave enforcement, and freelancer protection.
- The Department of Correction (DOC, NYCD) is responsible for New York City's inmates, housing the majority of them on Rikers Island.
- The Department of Cultural Affairs (DCLA) supports New York City's cultural life, such as ensuring adequate public funding for non-profit cultural organizations.
- The Department of Design & Construction (DDC) builds many of the civic facilities in New York City, and as the city's primary capital construction project manager, provides new or renovated facilities such as firehouses, libraries, police precincts, courthouses and senior centers.
- The Department of Education (DOE) manages the city's public school system and is governed by the New York City Board of Education.
- The New York City Emergency Management (NYCEM) department is responsible for oversight and development of the City's emergency management plans.
- The Department of Environmental Protection (DEP) manages the city's water supply.
- The Department of Finance (DOF) is the revenue service, taxation agency and recorder of deeds.
  - The Sheriff's Office (Sheriff) is the primary civil law enforcement agency of New York City and the enforcement division of the New York City Department of Finance.
- The Fire Department (FDNY) provides fire protection, technical rescue, primary response to biological, chemical and radioactive hazards, and emergency medical services.
- The Department of Health & Mental Hygiene (DOHMH) is responsible for public health along with issuing birth certificates, dog licenses, and conducting restaurant inspection and enforcement.
- The Department of Homeless Services (DHS) provides services to the homeless.
- The Department of Housing Preservation & Development (HPD) is the mayoral agency responsible for developing and maintaining the city's stock of affordable housing.
- The Human Resources Administration (Department of Social Services; HRA/DSS) is the mayoral agency in charge of the majority of the city's social services programs.
- The Department of Investigation (DOI) is a law enforcement agency that serves as an independent and nonpartisan watchdog for New York City government.
- The New York City Landmarks Preservation Commission (LPC) is the agency charged with administering the city's Landmarks Preservation Law.
- The Law Department (Law) is responsible for most of the city's legal affairs.
- The Department of Parks & Recreation (Parks) is responsible for maintaining the city's parks system, preserving and maintaining the ecological diversity of the city's natural areas, and furnishing recreational opportunities for city's residents and visitors.
- The Police Department (NYPD) has the primary responsibilities in law enforcement and investigations throughout New York City.
- The Department of Probation (DOP) provides supervision for adults and juveniles placed on probation by judges in the Supreme, Criminal, and Family courts.
- The Department of Records & Information Services (DoRIS) organizes and stores records and information from the City Hall Library and Municipal Archives.
- The Department of Sanitation (DSNY) is responsible for garbage collection, recycling collection, street cleaning, and snow removal.
- The Department of Small Business Services (SBS) makes it easier for businesses in New York City to start, operate, and grow by providing free services to business owners, strengthening neighborhoods and commercial districts, and linking employers to a skilled and qualified workforce.
- The Office of Technology and Innovation (OTI) oversees the city's use of existing and emerging technologies in government operations, and its delivery of services to the public.
- The Department of Transportation (DOT) is responsible for the management of much of the city's transportation infrastructure.
- The Department of Veterans' Services (DVS)
- The Department of Youth & Community Development (DYCD) supports youth and their families through a range of youth and community development programs, and administers city, state and federal funds to community-based organizations.
- The Office of Chief Medical Examiner of the City of New York (OCME) investigates cases of persons who die when in apparent good health or unattended by a physician, such as from criminal violence, suicide, or in any suspicious or unusual manner.
- The Office of Management and Budget (OMB) is the City's financial agency, which assembles and oversees the expense and capital budgets for the city.
- The Mayor's Advisory Committee on the Judiciary (MACJ)
- The Mayor's Fund to Advance New York City
- The Mayor's Office of Asylum Seeker Operations (OASO)
- The Mayor's Community Affairs Unit (CAU)
- The Mayor's Office of Contract Services (MOCS)
- The Mayor's Office for the Prevention of Hate Crimes (OPHC)
- The Mayor's Office of Criminal Justice (MOCJ)
- The Mayor's Office of Media and Entertainment (MOME) coordinates municipal support for film and television production, including approving film shoots and liaising with government agencies and promoting the industry.
  - NYC Media is the radio, television, and online media network of New York City.
- The Mayor's Office For People with Disabilities (MOPD) is a liaison to the NYC disability community on behalf of the NYC Mayor's Office. In conjunction with all other city agencies and offices, assess and coordinate city policies relating to all people with disabilities.
- The New York City Office of Workforce Development (WKDEV) coordinates workforce development with economic development.
  - The New York City Workforce Development Board (WDB) oversees Workforce Innovation and Opportunity Act activities, and is the local board counterpart to the New York State Workforce Investment Board.

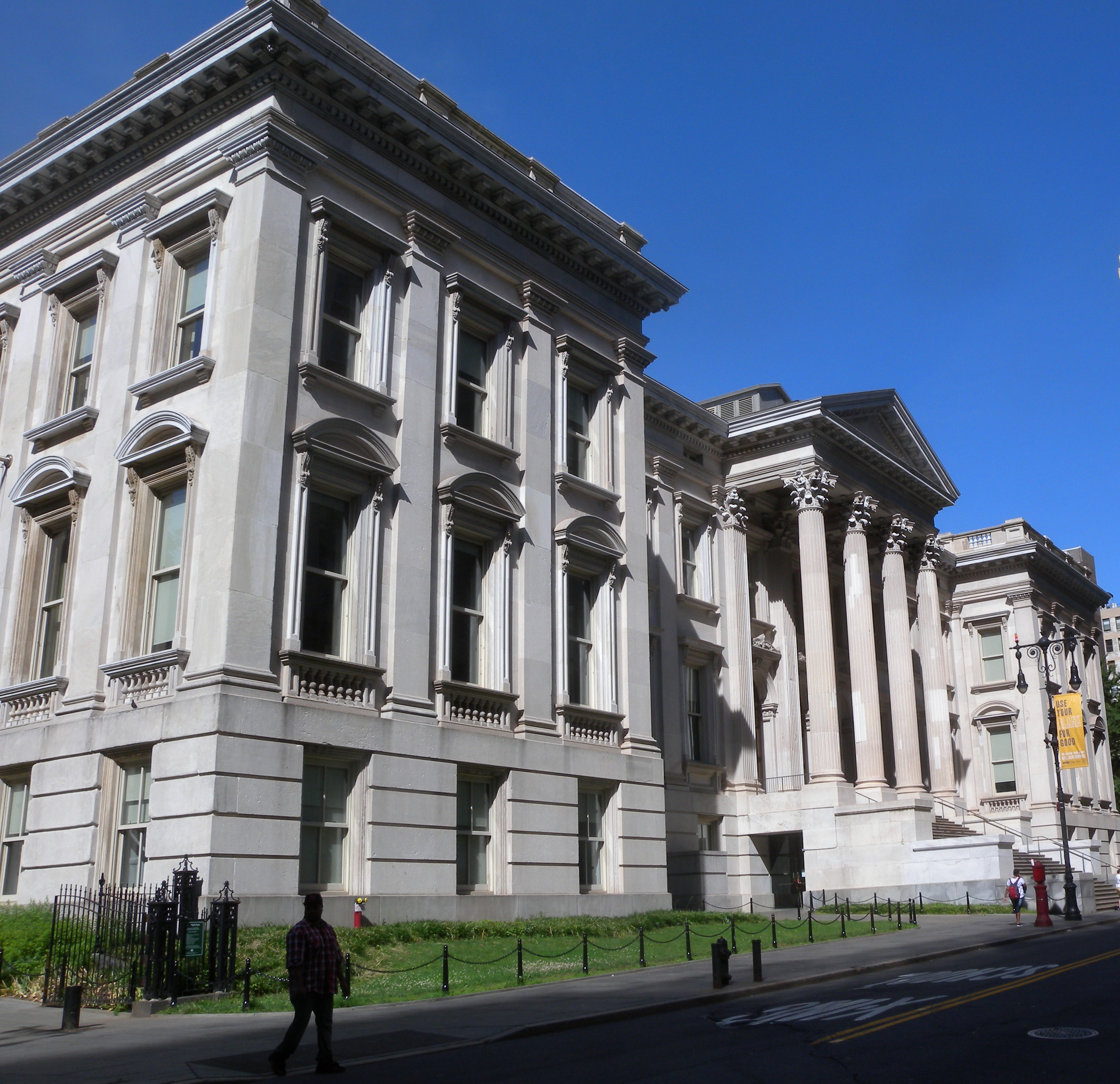
The Tweed Courthouse, headquarters of the Department of Education

- The Mayor's Office of Ethnic and Community Media (MOECM) focuses on the diverse array of media outlets serving New York City, and oversees and supports city agency marketing.
- Mayor's Office of Administrative Services
- Mayor's Office of Animal Welfare (MOAW)
- Mayor's Office of Appointments
- Mayor's Office of Child Care and Early Childhood Education (OCCECE)
- Mayor's Committee on City Marshals (MCCM)
- Mayor's Office of Citywide Event Coordination and Management (CECM)
- Mayor's Office of Climate and Environmental Justice (MOCEJ), which is headed by the Chief Climate Officer (currently Louise Yeung)
- Mayor's Office to Combat Antisemitism
- Mayor's Office of Community Mental Health (OCMH)
- Mayor’s Office of Community Safety (OCS)
- Mayor's Office for Economic Opportunity (NYC OPPORTUNITY)
- Mayor's Office to End Domestic and Gender-Based Violence (ENDGBV)
- Mayor's Office of Environmental Coordination (MOEC)
- Mayor's Office of Environmental Remediation (OER)
- Mayor's Office of Equity and Racial Justice (MOERJ)
- Mayor's Office of Faith-based and Community Partnerships (OFCP)
- Mayor's Office of Food Policy (MOFP)
- Mayor's Office of Housing Recovery Operations (HRO)
- Mayor's Office of Immigrant Affairs (MOIA)
- Mayor's Office of Innovation and Emerging Markets
- Mayor's Office of International Affairs (IA)
- Mayor's Office of LGBTQIA+ Affairs
- Mayor's Office of Mass Engagement
- Mayor's Office of Media and Entertainment (MOME)
- Mayor's Office of Minority and Women-Owned Business Enterprises (MWBE)
- Mayor's Office of Nonprofit Services (MONS)
- Mayor's Office of Operations (OPS)
- Mayor's Office of Pensions and Investments (MOPI)
- Mayor's Office to Prevent Gun Violence
- Mayor's Office to Protect Tenants (MOPT)
- Mayor's Office of Risk Management and Compliance (MORMC)
- Mayor's Office of Special Enforcement (OSE)
- Mayor's Office of Special Projects and Community Events (MOSPCE)
- Mayor's Office of Sports, Wellness and Recreation (MOSWR)
- Mayor's Office of Strategic Partnerships (OSP)
- Mayor's Office of Talent and Workforce Development (NYC Talent)
- Mayor's Office of Urban Agriculture (MOUA)
- Mayor's Office of the Utility Consumer Advocate
- Mayor's Office of Youth Employment (MOYE)
- Mayor's Public Engagement Unit (PEU)

== Non-mayoral ==
- The New York City Office of the Actuary (NYCOA) provides actuarial information and services for the five major New York City Retirement Systems and Pension Funds.
  - The New York City Board of Education Retirement System (BERS) was founded on August 31, 1921. The benefits that BERS provides include service retirement benefits, disability retirement benefits, death benefits, and a Tax-Deferred Annuity (TDA) program. Members are employed in agencies such as the Department of Education, the School Construction Authority, and the Police Department.
- The Office of Administrative Trials and Hearings (OATH) conducts administrative hearings, overseeing the operations of four tribunals: the OATH Tribunal, the Environmental Control Board, the Health Tribunal, and the Taxi & Limousine Tribunal.
- The New York City Banking Commission administers banking programs.
- The Board of Correction (BOC) regulates conditions of confinement, correctional health, and mental health care in city correctional facilities.
- The New York City Board of Elections
- The Board of Standards and Appeals (BSA) regulates land use, development, and construction by reviewing and deciding on variances, special permits, and appeals from zoning, building, and fire regulatory decisions.
- The Campaign Finance Board (CFB) is an independent, nonpartisan agency gives public matching funds to qualifying candidates in exchange for strict contribution and spending limits and a full audit of their finances.
- The New York City Clerk is the city clerk and clerk of the City Council.
  - The New York City Marriage Bureau provides marriage licenses, domestic partnership registration, civil marriage ceremonies, registration of marriage officiants, and copies and amendments of marriage records.
- The Civil Service Commission (CSC) is the local civil service commission and hears appeals by city employees and applicants that have been disciplined or disqualified.
- The New York City Civilian Complaint Review Board (CCRB) is the board tasked with investigating complaints about alleged misconduct on the part of the New York City Police Department.
- The Office of Collective Bargaining (OCB) regulates labor relations disputes and controversies with city employees, including certification of collective bargaining representatives, mediation, impasse panels, and arbitration.
- The Conflicts of Interest Board (COIB) is the city ethics board that enforces the Conflicts of Interest Law, Annual Disclosure Law, and Lobbyist Gift Law.
- The Franchise and Concession Review Committee (FCRC) regulates use of city-owned property.
- The New York City Commission on Human Rights (CCHR) enforces the city's Human Rights Law.
- The Independent Budget Office (IBO) is a publicly funded agency that provides nonpartisan information about the city's budget and local economy to the public and their elected officials.
- The New York City In Rem Foreclosure Release Board is authorized to reverse property tax foreclosures/seizures.
- The Latin Media & Entertainment Commission (LMEC) advises the Mayor on business development and retention strategies for the Latin media and entertainment industry.
- The New York City Loft Board regulates the legal conversion of certain lofts from commercial/manufacturing to residential use.
- The New York City Procurement Policy Board (PPB) regulates the procurement of goods, services, and construction that uses city money.
- The New York City Public Design Commission (Art Commission) reviews permanent works of art, architecture, and landscape architecture proposed on or over city-owned property.
- The Rent Guidelines Board (RGB) regulates rents in the city.
- The New York City Tax Appeals Tribunal conducts administrative hearings and hears appeals regarding city-administered taxes (other than real estate taxes).
- The New York City Tax Commission reviews city-administered real estate taxes.
- The Taxi and Limousine Commission (TLC) regulates medallion (yellow) taxicabs, for-hire vehicles (community-based liveries and black cars), commuter vans, paratransit vehicles (ambulettes), and certain luxury limousines.

== Other ==
Other state agencies, authorities and other corporations include:

- City University of New York
- New York City Panel for Educational Policy
- New York City Economic Development Corporation
- New York City Health and Hospitals Corporation
- New York City Housing Authority
- New York City School Construction Authority
- New York City Soil and Water Conservation District

== See also ==
- New York State Financial Control Board
- Rules of the City of New York
