= Richard Varick =

American politician and military officer (1753–1831)

- Portrait by John Trumbull, c. 1805

46th Mayor of New York City
- In office October 12, 1789 – December 31, 1801
- Preceded by: James Duane
- Succeeded by: Edward Livingston

2nd Attorney General of New York
- In office May 14, 1788 – September 29, 1789
- Governor: George Clinton
- Preceded by: Egbert Benson
- Succeeded by: Aaron Burr

6th Speaker of the New York State Assembly
- In office January 12, 1787 – December 10, 1788
- Preceded by: John Lansing Jr.
- Succeeded by: John Lansing Jr.

15th Recorder of New York City
- In office February 20, 1784 – September 29, 1789
- Preceded by: John Watts
- Succeeded by: Samuel Jones

Personal details
- Born: March 15, 1753 Hackensack, Province of New Jersey, British America
- Died: July 30, 1831 (aged 78) Jersey City, New Jersey, U.S.
- Resting place: First Reformed Dutch Church Cemetery in Hackensack, New Jersey, U.S.
- Party: Federalist
- Spouse: Maria Roosevelt

Military service
- Allegiance: United States
- Branch/service: Continental Army; New York State Militia
- Years of service: 1775 - 1801
- Rank: Colonel
- Battles/wars: American Revolutionary War

Richard Varick (March 15, 1753 – July 30, 1831) was an American lawyer, military officer, and politician who has been referred to as "The Forgotten Founding Father." A major figure in the development of post-Independence New York City and the state of New York, Varick became the 46th mayor of New York City in 1789 and served eleven consecutive one-year terms until 1801.

Previous to his terms as mayor, Varick served as the 14th Recorder of New York City from 1784 to 1789. An office that no longer exists, it equates to 'Chief Legal Officer'. Along with Samuel Jones, Varick codified New York State's first statutes after the American Revolution in the Laws of New York (2 vols., 1789). This body of work laid the legal groundwork for Varick to institute the Law of New York, the New York City Administrative Code, and the Rules of New York City during his terms as mayor. Additionally, under his leadership, the progenitors of the New York City Department of Health, the New York Stock Exchange, and many other organizations would be created. These organizations established the foundation of modern New York City.

During the American Revolutionary War, Varick served as George Washington's aide-de-camp and private secretary. Varick's body of work from this era would lead to the Varick Transcripts, which now live in the Library of Congress. The value of these documents has been noted throughout their lifetime as invaluable to the understanding of the formation of the United States.

Varick was a founder of the Society of the Cincinnati and the American Bible Society, and was a slaveholder. He was also a longtime trustee of Columbia University, where he was chairman of the board from 1810 to 1816.

== Early life and family ==
He was born on March 15, 1753, at Hackensack in Bergen County, New Jersey, to John Varick and Jane (née Dey) Varick. Both Varick's parents ancestors had emigrated with the Dutch West India Company in the early to mid 17th century and remained in the greater New York City area. Amongst Varick's ancestors are Joris Jansen Rapelje, a member of the Council of Twelve Men which was the first democratic body in the history of the United States (1641). Varick's maternal grandfather was a colonel in the Continental Army whose house, the Dey Mansion, which would go on to play a pivotal role in the American Revolution.

Varick was one of seven children, his siblings being: Abraham Varick (the great-grandfather of Anna Maria Romeyn Varick, who married George Lauder of the Lauder Greenway Family.); Dr. John Varick Jr.; Anne Elting; Sarah Froeligh; Jane De Witt (wife of Simeon De Witt); and Maria Gilbert.

=== Education ===
Little is known about the specifics of Varick's education before university, though surviving letters indicate that he was educated by private tutors and studied Latin, French, and other subjects. He enrolled in King's College (the original name of Columbia University) in New York City in 1771 where he studied under John Morin Scott. Varick clerked for Scott during his education and after being admitted into the New York Bar in October 1774, Scott made him an offer to be a partner in his firm. Unusually, Varick had not yet graduated from King's College despite having passed the bar and never formally graduated. Later in his career, Varick would become a trustee of King's College for over thirty years.

== Military career ==
=== American Revolutionary War ===
==== Service under General Schuyler and Northern Army ====
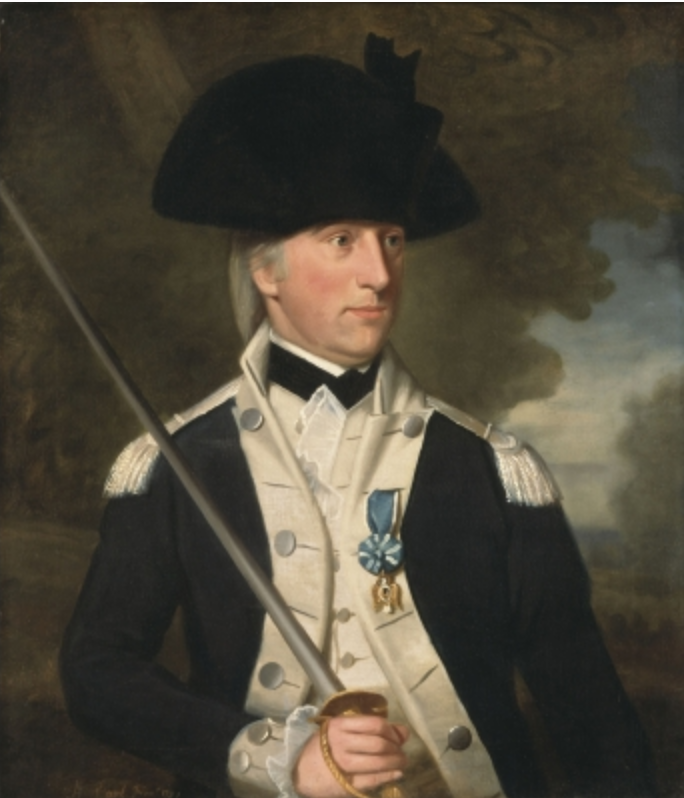
Richard Varick painted c.1787 by Ralph Earl. The portrait shows Varick in his Continental Army officers uniform although he retired his commission in 1783. The blue decoration is that of the Society of the Cincinnati.

Eight months into his career in private practice, the American Revolutionary War began. Under the influence of his employer, John Morin Scott, Varick suspended his studies and enlisted in the militia. On June 28, 1775, he was appointed captain of the 1st New York Regiment, and after only three days as field officer was appointed military secretary under General Philip Schuyler who was in command of the Northern Army. It was thought that Scott, understanding the administrative and intellectual value of his young partner, secured the appointment. Varick departed New York City with Schuyler on July 4, 1775, to head north to Fort Ticonderoga and launch the campaign to drive the British out of Canada. En route, the traveling party stopped in Albany briefly where Varick would first meet General Benedict Arnold, who would become a good friend and play a significant role in Varick's life until Arnold's treason in 1780.

By the summer of 1776, Schuyler had been felled by multiple illnesses and was reeling from a series of losses on the battlefield. Varick, by this juncture, in part out of necessity, and in part by appointment, was performing three jobs at once: private secretary to Schuyler, quartermaster for all the northern forts held by the Continental Army, and the Northern Army's deputy muster master general. Laterally, actual battlefield commands had been outsourced to Arnold and to General Horatio Gates. Schuyler, recognizing the burden Varick was carrying, promoted him to Lieutenant Colonel. Varick's almost total control of the administration for the Northern Army led to an even closer friendship between Arnold and Varick.

That same summer, Arnold was planning his attack effort to stop the British advance down Lake Champlain in what would be one of the first battles in the history of the U.S. Navy. With a dearth of available ships, the armada was largely built from scratch by Varick who solved the crisis by contacting his wide network in New York City and the surrounding area to send materials and coastal men who were qualified for such work. While the Battle of Valcour Island ended in defeat for the navy, it succeeded in slowing the British advance for the winter as they retreated to their Canadian bases.

Varick also faced run-ins with fellow officers who were not part of Schuyler's faction. General Anthony Walton White, who had briefly served as Washington's aide-de-camp, was accused by Schuyler of looting a private home on the frontier. After denying the charges, White barged into Varick's offices and challenged him to a duel, under the impression that Varick had spoken negatively to his character. Varick, unarmed, narrowly escaped White's attempt to murder him after Varick declined the challenge.

After the disastrous loss at Fort Ticonderoga, Schuyler was removed from duty by the Continental Congress in August 1777 and replaced by General Gates. With factionalism rife within the Northern Army, Varick was aligned with Arnold which pitted him against Gates, whom he disliked regardless. Varick and Arnold's circle of friendship had also grown to include Henry Brockholst Livingston and Matthew Clarkson. Their camaraderie was rudely defined as "The New York Gang" by James Wilkinson, a partisan of General Gates.

Varick would quietly and capably continue in his role as the Northern Army's deputy muster master general, though not as Gates' aide-de-camp or private secretary, until January 12, 1780, when the department was abolished by the Continental Congress in a larger reorganization.

==== Service under General Arnold ====
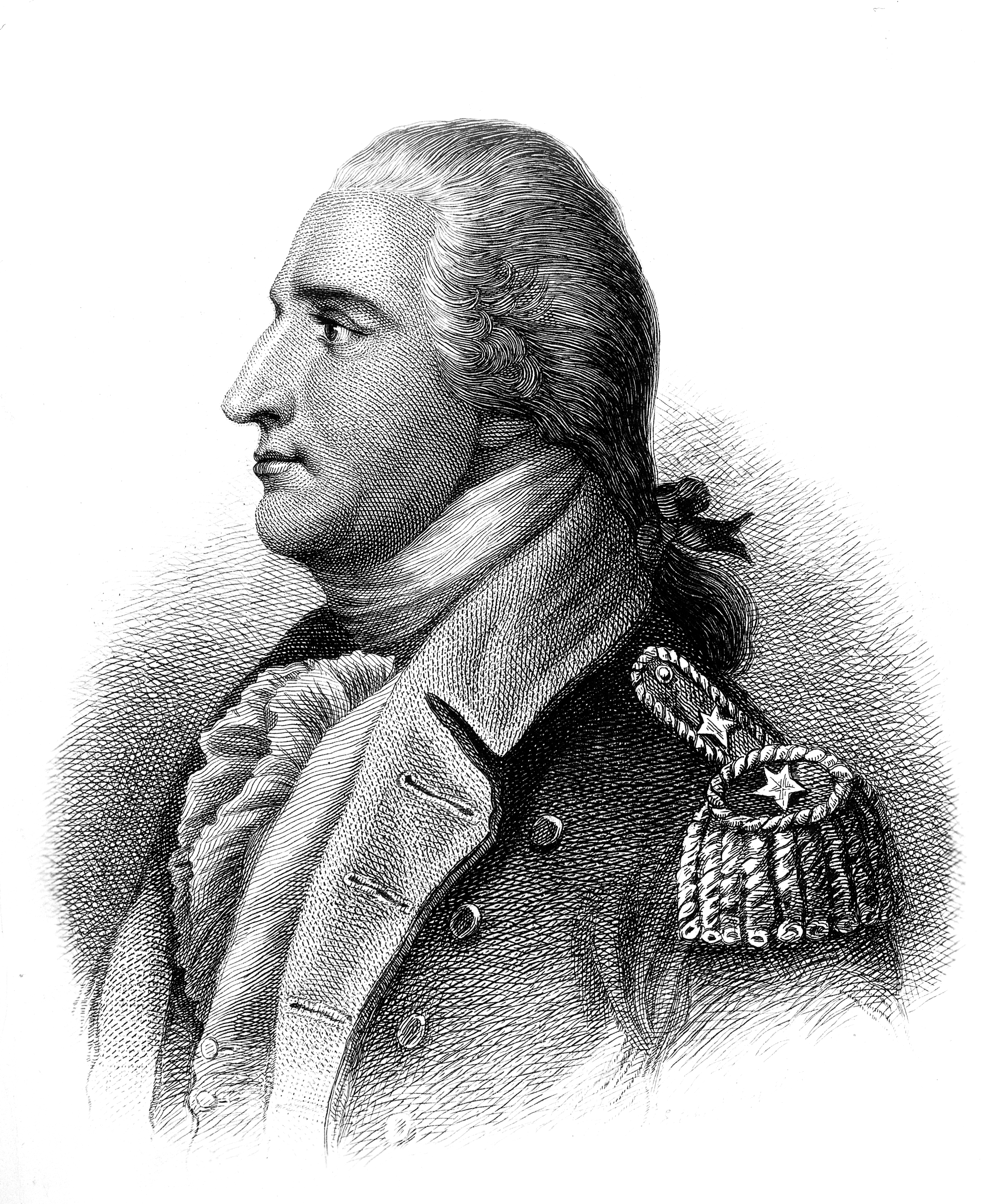
Benedict Arnold

Varick briefly resumed his private practice in law, which proved challenging in his politically volatile hometown of New York City—which was under occupation by the enemy. In August 1780, Benedict Arnold approached Varick about joining Arnold's staff at his newly appointed position as commanding officer of West Point (then an active military installation) as his aide-de-camp and inspector-general.

Within three months, Arnold's treason was discovered and he fled to British territory. Varick, along with David Franks, was arrested. Varick had been ill in bed when informed both of Arnold's treason and his own arrest. Contemporary reports described Varick as spending several days on the edge of madness about Arnold's defection. Despite Arnold writing to Washington personally to say that his aides were not complicit, both Varick and Franks were detained by Washington as a precautionary measure. After a court of inquiry completed its investigation, it found Varick not guilty (as did a separate court martial find Franks), and delivered the following:

“That Lieutenant Colonel Varick’s conduct with respect to the base Peculations and Treasonable Practices of the late General Arnold is not only unimpeachable but think him entitled (throughout every part of his conduct) to a degree of Merit that does him great honor as an Officer and particularly distinguishes him as a sincere Friend to his Country…”

==== Service under General Washington ====
A by-product of the above was the introduction of Varick to George Washington, which would lead to the two working together for the rest of their careers, and lives. This relationship began in 1781 when Washington petitioned the Continental Congress to establish team of writers to record and preserve all of his, and the army's, papers, planning, and correspondence for use by future generations. This would be under the supervision “of a Man of character in whom entire confidence can be placed”. Washington appointed Varick in this role, which made use of his highly respected administrative skills, and would fully rehabilitate his name after the Arnold scandal. Establishing his office at Poughkeepsie, Varick and his assistants spent more than two years in compiling the forty-four folio volumes known as the Varick Transcripts. Varick served under Washington solely until Washington retired his commission in 1783.

Upon completing the assigned duties after years of work, General Washington wrote:

“I take this first opportunity of signifying my entire approbation of the manner in which you have executed the important duties of recording secretary; and the satisfaction I feel in having my papers so properly arranged, and so correctly recorded; and beg you will accept my thanks for the care and attention which you have given to this business and beg you be persuaded, that I shall take pleasure in asserting on every occasion, the sense of entertainment of the fidelity, skill and indefatigable industry manifested by you in the performance of your public duties."

After he retired from his service in the Continental Army, Varick would remain in service as a colonel in the New York State Militia until 1801.

===== The Varick Transcripts =====
The Varick Transcripts are deposited in the Library of Congress. The value of these documents has been noted throughout their lifetime as invaluable to the understanding of the formation of the United States.

As originally provisioned by Congress, the stated duties by General Washington to Colonel Varick as Recording Secretary would include categorizing, transcribing, and assembling all Washington's papers. The resulting 44 letterbooks contain copies of all documents dating from May, 1775 to June, 1785. Categories of papers, records, and correspondence are organized as follows;

1. Continental Congress
2. Continental and State Military Personnel
3. Civil Officials and Private Citizens
4. Foreign Officers and Subjects of Foreign Nations
5. Enemy Officers and British Subjects
6. Continental Army Council Proceedings (War Council Proceedings)
7. General Orders
8. Personal Correspondence

=== Society of the Cincinnati ===
In 1783 the Society of the Cincinnati was founded of which Varick was an original member and president of the New York chapter from 1783 until his death in 1831. Membership was generally limited to officers who had served at least three years in the Continental Army or Navy. The first meeting of the Society was held in May at a dinner at Mount Gulian (Verplanck House) in Fishkill, New York, before the British evacuation from New York City. The meeting was chaired by Varick's friend Lieutenant Colonel Alexander Hamilton. The Society has three goals: "To preserve the rights so dearly won; to promote the continuing union of the states; and to assist members in need, their widows, and their orphans."

Varick would also be responsible for maintaining the legacy of George Washington. From 1790 to 1836, celebrations of Washington's birthday in the City included Tammany Hall dinners, Washington Benevolent Society parades, and an intimate open house held each February 22 by Mary Simpson (c. 1752 - March 18, 1836), at her John Street grocery.

== Political career ==
=== Recorder and Attorney General of New York (1784–1789) ===
Varick was the Recorder of New York City from 1784 to 1789. An office that no longer exists, it is equatable to 'Chief Legal Officer.' In this office, along with Samuel Jones, he codified New York State's first statutes after the Revolution in the Laws of New York (2 vols., 1789). This body of work laid the foundation for the Law of New York, the New York City Administrative Code, and the Rules of New York City.

Concurrently to the above, he was a member of the New York State Assembly from New York County from 1786 to 1788. During his term as a member of the New York State Assembly, he was Speaker during the sessions of 1787 and 1788. Varick was appointed the New York State Attorney General from 1788 to 1789.

Remarkably, due to the elitist nature of the New York State Constitution of 1777, almost all government positions in the city and state of New York were appointed by the Council of Appointment. Few, if any, general elections or other democratic functions would exist until 1802. Thus, in the year 1788, Varick was simultaneously the Recorder of New York City, a State Assemblyman representing New York City, the Speaker of the House of the State of New York, and the Attorney General of the State of New York. Though Varick is on record protesting the egregious nature of his occupying multiple offices, it was rationalized at the time that as both an expert administrator and lawyer, he was an ideal choice to fill these myriad offices and to build swiftly the various mechanisms of government. And, that the subsequent laws were codified quickly in the nascent days of an independent New York City and State to ensure the function, and growth, of both entities.

=== Mayor of New York City (1789–1801) ===
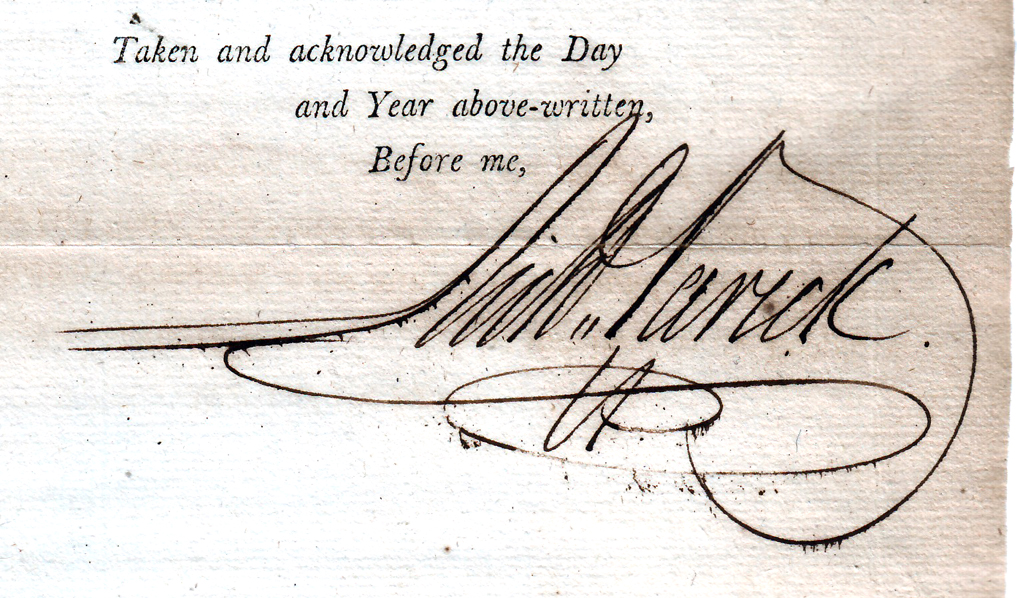
Signature of Richard Varick while Mayor of New York (1798)

Varick would peak politically as the Mayor of New York City for twelve years during the formative post-Independence era from 1789 to 1801. While Mayor, he would continue his establishment of the technocratic structure that would ensure New York City's place as the commercial capital of the United States, despite the political capital moving to Philadelphia, then Washington D.C. At this time in history, there was no precedent of commercial and political leadership split between two cities.

In 1791, the major financial crisis would hit the United States in New York due to a scheme to manipulate the financial markets, which had no formal structure of any kind. Varick would have to increase officers to protect the guilty parties from mobs gathering outside the prison. This would lead to a group of merchants making the "Buttonwood Agreement” in 1792 which was the seed of the New York Stock Exchange.

In the summer of 1793 a yellow fever epidemic sent New Yorkers "fleeing north" to nearby healthful Greenwich Village. This epidemic would lead to the creation of what would become the New York City Department of Health. This was timely as there were further epidemics in 1795, 1796, 1798, 1799, and 1800.

In 1794, public anger at Federalist political ideals spilled into the streets with Varick's support of the Jay Treaty. An angry mob would almost physically run him out of the city.

Varick ran into more trouble when he tried to pressure the city's 1,000 or so licensed workers — tavern keepers, grocers, butchers and cartmen, all of whom had licenses to work for the city — to vote for Federalist candidates. “This went completely contrary to the egalitarian sentiment of the time,” Dr. Hodges said. Varick's heavy-handed ways, Dr. Hodges said, pushed many of the workers away from the Federalists, represented by Alexander Hamilton, and into the opposing Democratic-Republican faction, represented by Thomas Jefferson. In 1797, after losing his seat representing New York State in the U.S. Senate, Aaron Burr took control of Tammany Hall and used it to assail Varick for his use of marketing and tax-licensing fees. Burr would win the state's electoral vote in the 1800 presidential election leading to a wide sweeping rout of Federalist politicians across New York, including Varick in 1801.

== Post-Political Life ==
=== Founding of Jersey City ===
In 1804, Varick, who was out of office and politically unpopular in New York City, joined his friend Alexander Hamilton to create the Associates of the Jersey Company which would lay the groundwork for modern Jersey City through private development. The consortium behind the company were predominantly Federalists who, like Varick and Hamilton, had been swept out of power in the election of 1800 by Thomas Jefferson and other Democratic-Republicans. Large tracts of land in Paulus Hook were purchased by the company with the titles owned by Varick and his two cousins, Anthony Dey, a prominent attorney and major land owner, and Jacob Radcliff, a Justice of the New York Supreme Court who would later become mayor of New York City (twice) from 1810 to 1811 and again from 1815 to 1818. They laid out the city squares and streets that still characterize the neighborhood, giving them names also seen in Lower Manhattan or after war heroes (Grove, Varick, Mercer, Wayne, Monmouth and Montgomery among them).

Prospect Hall in 1812

In 1816, Colonel Varick purchased lots on the north side of Essex Street and built Prospect Hall overlooking the Hudson River. The property was landscaped with lawns and gardens to the waterfront. Varick would become the figurehead of the continuing development of Jersey City, inviting luminary friends such as Major General Marquis de Lafayette to visit while touring America in 1824 for special Fourth of July celebrations. Varick would live at Prospect Hall until he died on July 30, 1831.

=== Founding of the American Bible Society ===
Varick was a founder of the American Bible Society in 1816. He would later become president (succeeding John Jay) in 1828 until his death in 1831.

== Personal life ==
He and his wife Maria Roosevelt, daughter of Isaac Roosevelt, were married on May 8, 1786, in New York City. His father-in-law was the patrilineal great-great-grandfather of President Franklin Delano Roosevelt.

On February 15, 2022, the Washington Post reported that Richard Varick was on the list of New York City mayors who owned slaves, a list compiled Sarah Cate Wolfson, a New York City high school student. According to the 1790 US census, Varick's New York City household included one enslaved person. According to the US census of 1800, it included three. The US census of 1810 indicated that the Varick household included four enslaved persons. An 1816 city jury ward census indicated that Varick's household had one enslaved person, and two black residents who were not slaves. The US census for 1820 showed Varick as a resident of Jersey, New Jersey, where one enslaved person resided with him. According to the 1830 US census, Varick resided in Jersey City, and his home included no enslaved persons.

Varick and his wife initially resided at 52 Wall Street, then moved to a larger home on lower Broadway. They also owned a home at 11 Pearl Street in Lower Manhattan. Their final home was Prospect Hall on Essex Street in Jersey City, New Jersey.

== Death and burial ==
Varick died on July 30, 1831, at Prospect Hall and is interred at the First Reformed Dutch Church Cemetery in Hackensack, New Jersey.

== Eponyms ==
Varick Street (where he once owned property) in Manhattan in the City of New York, Varick Street in Jersey City, and the Town of Varick, New York, all bear his name.

== See also ==
- George Washington
- Benedict Arnold
- Alexander Hamilton
- West Point
- Revolutionary War
- History of New York City
- Jersey City
- Society of the Cincinnati
- Mayors of New York City

Political offices
Preceded by John Lansing Jr.	Speaker of the New York State Assembly; 1787–1788	Succeeded by John Lansing Jr.
Preceded by James Duane	Mayor of New York City; 1789–1801	Succeeded by Edward Livingston
Legal offices
Preceded by John Watts	Recorder of New York City; 1784–1789	Succeeded by Samuel Jones
Preceded by Egbert Benson	New York State Attorney General; 1788–1789	Succeeded by Aaron Burr
