= Muriel Goode-Trufant =

American legal officer

Muriel Goode-Trufant is the 82nd Corporation Counsel of the City of New York.

An American attorney with a tenure over thirty years in New York municipal law, Goode-Trufant had served as the First Assistant Corporation Counsel since 2023, and prior to that appointment was the New York City Law Department's Managing Attorney. She was appointed by New York City Mayor Eric Adams and confirmed in December 2024 by the New York City Council.

== Early life and education ==
Goode-Trufant received her undergraduate degree from University of Pennsylvania before receiving her Juris Doctor degree from Temple University School of Law.

== Legal career ==
Prior to working for the City, Goode-Trufant was an associate attorney at the Philadelphia law firm Cohen, Shapiro, Polisher, Shiekman & Cohen.

Goode-Trufant began her career at the New York City Law Department in 1991 as an attorney in the General Litigation Division. Over the years, Goode-Trufant held multiple roles at the NYC Law Department, including Assistant Chief of the Division and the agency’s Equal Employment Opportunity Officer. Goode-Trufant later became the Chief of the Special Federal Litigation Division.

In 2015, Goode-Trufant was appointed the Law Department’s Managing Attorney, a role in which she ensured the department’s legal operations ran smoothly. In 2023, she was promoted to First Assistant Corporation Counsel.

In late 2024, New York City Mayor Eric Adams nominated Goode-Trufant to serve as the City's 82nd Corporation Counsel, the top civil legal position in New York City and head of the City's Law Department. Goode-Trufant was confirmed by the City Council with a vote of 41 to 7 on December 5, 2024.
