= Sugary drinks portion cap rule =

2013 limit on sweetened drinks in New York

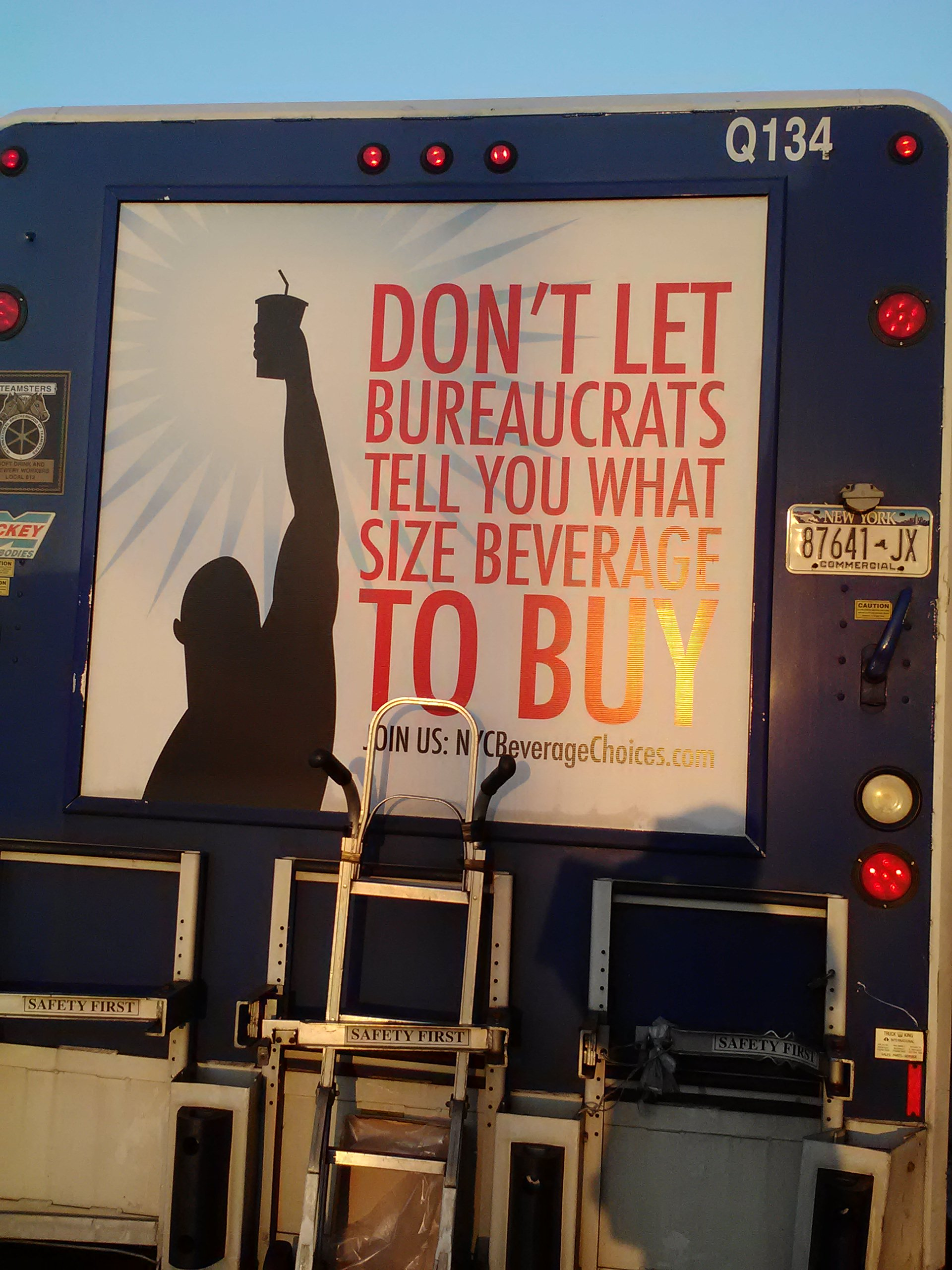
Soft drink size limit protest sign placed on a delivery truck by New York's Pepsi bottler

The sugary drinks portion cap rule, also known as the soda ban, was a proposed limit on soft drink size in New York City intended to prohibit the sale of many sweetened drinks more than 16 fluid ounces (0.47 liters) in volume to have taken effect on March 12, 2013. On June 26, 2014, the New York Court of Appeals, the state's highest court, ruled that the New York City Board of Health, in adopting the regulation, exceeded the scale of its regulatory authority and as such, was repealed. Before the repeal, the regulation was codified in section 81.53 of the New York City Health Code (title 24 of the Rules of the City of New York).

== Regulation ==
Under the plan, all New York City regulated restaurants, fast-food establishments, delis, movie theaters, sports stadia, and food carts would be barred from selling sugar-sweetened drinks in cups larger than 16 ounces (0.5 liters). The regulation would not apply to drinks sold in grocery stores or convenience stores, including 7-Eleven, which are regulated by the state. In addition, the regulation would exclude: drinks that were more than 70% fruit juice, diet sodas, drinks with at least 50% milk or milk substitute, and alcoholic beverages.

== Support and opposition ==
The regulation was strongly supported by Mayor Michael Bloomberg and continued to be supported by his successor, Mayor Bill de Blasio. Approximately 32,000 written and oral comments were received in support of the proposal, and approximately 6,000 comments were received in opposition. Opponents include beverage companies such as PepsiCo and their independent bottlers and distributors serving the city, which have launched campaigns against the limit. These opposing companies claim the limit would affect lower income families in a negative way and force them to drink less of the unhealthy beverages. The proposed regulation was also opposed by New York State Conference of the NAACP and the Hispanic Federation, a representative organization for 90 Latino nonprofit agencies providing health and human services in the New York metropolitan area. Coca-Cola has been a major sponsor of the NAACP initiative for healthy eating. Pepsi and Coca-Cola have sponsored the NAACP New York State chapter annual conferences, and Coca-Cola was the 2014 co-chair of the Hispanic Federation Gala. The city's attorneys said the number of ounces did not matter, and that the number lacked scientific evidence.

Mayor Bill de Blasio also met with Mary Bassett, the city's commissioner for the Department of Health and Mental Hygiene, Lilliam Barrios-Paoli, the deputy mayor for health and human services, The Coca-Cola Company, PepsiCo Inc., and Dr Pepper Snapple Group in a continuing attempt to regulate the size of high-sugar drinks. In September 2014, at the Clinton Global Initiative's annual conference in Manhattan, Coca-Cola, PepsiCo and the Dr Pepper Snapple Group voluntarily pledged to reduce U.S. calorie consumption in sugary drinks by an average of 20% by 2025.

== History ==
On May 30, 2012, Mayor Michael Bloomberg announced the portion cap rule, a proposed amendment to article 81 of the New York City Health Code, that would require "food service establishments" (FSEs) to cap at 16 ounces (475 mL) the size of cups and containers used to offer, provide, and sell sugary beverages. On June 12, 2012, the New York City Department of Health and Mental Hygiene (DOHMH) presented to the New York City Board of Health the proposed amendment. On June 19, 2012, a notice of intention to amend article 81 was published in the City Record, and a public hearing was held on July 24, 2012.

On September 13, 2012, the Board of Health voted unanimously to accept the proposed limit. The limit was to take effect six months after passage and be enforced by the city's regular restaurant inspection team, allowing business owners three months to adapt to the changes before facing fines. Those plans fell through due to the invalidation of the regulation by New York Supreme Court Judge Milton Tingling on March 11, 2013. The mayor's office indicated that the city would appeal. On June 11, 2013, the DOHMH went to court to fight the ruling that blocked the limit. On July 30, 2013, the New York Supreme Court, Appellate Division ruled against the proposed limit, saying it violates "the principle of separation of powers" and the board "failed to act within the bounds of its lawfully delegated authority".

On June 26, 2014, the New York Court of Appeals, the state's highest court, ruled that the New York City Board of Health, in adopting the sugary drinks portion cap rule, exceeded the scope of its regulatory authority. The amendment was repealed on July 9, 2015, effective August 8 that year.

== See also ==
- Obesity in the United States
- Mayoralty of Michael Bloomberg
- Law of New York (state)
