= George Pierce Andrews =

American lawyer and judge (1835–1902)

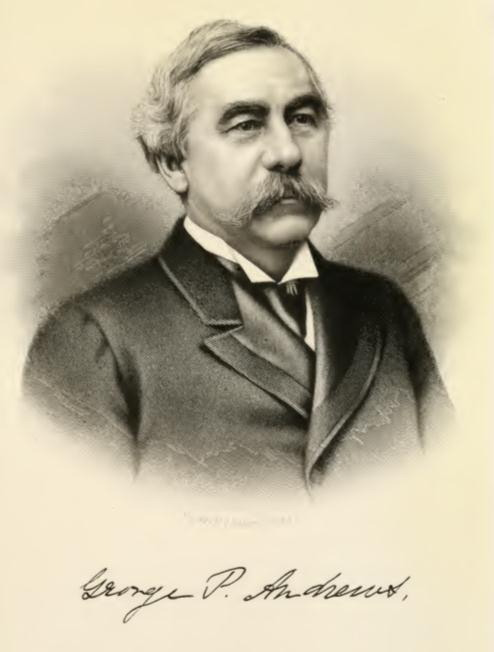

Justice of the New York Supreme Court
- In office 1898-1902
- In office 1883–1897

Corporation Counsel to the City of New York
- In office 1882–1883

Personal details
- Born: September 29, 1835 North Brighton, Maine
- Died: May 24, 1902 (aged 66) New York, New York
- Party: Democratic
- Other political affiliations: Republican (1897)
- Spouse: Catherine Van Auken (m. 1889)
- Education: Yale University

George Pierce Andrews (September 29, 1835 – May 24, 1902) was an American lawyer and judge who served on the New York Supreme Court from 1883 to 1887 and from 1898 to 1902.

== Early life and education ==
Andrews was born on September 29, 1835, in North Brighton, Maine to Colonel Solomon Andrews and Sybil A. Farnsworth. At the age of 15, Andrews attended Williston Seminary in Easthampton, Massachusetts. He enrolled in Yale College in 1854 and graduated in 1858.

== Career ==
After graduation, Andrews moved to Portland, Maine, and studied law in the office of U.S. senator William P. Fessenden, who later became the U.S. secretary of the treasury. In 1858 Andrews moved to Carroll Parish, Louisiana where he worked as a tutor for a southern family. While in Carroll Parish he continued his studies by reading legal textbooks and in 1860 Andrews went to New York City and studied law with Henry P. Fesseden, a relative of the Senator.

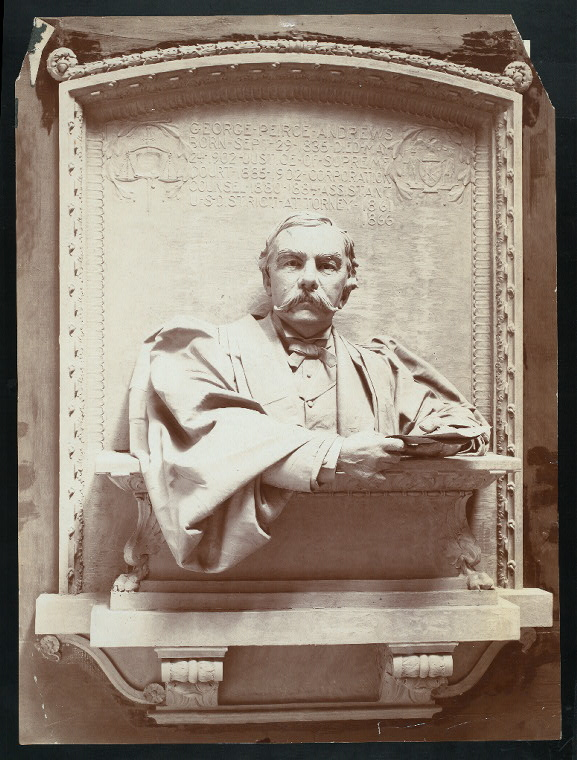
Bronze Bust of George Pierce Andrews by George Brewster.

He then got a clerkship in the office of the U.S. attorney for the Southern District of New York, serving under James I. Roosevelt. He was admitted to the New York State Bar in May 1860. In around 1861 Andrews was made an assistant United States attorney serving under Theodore Sedgwick, James I. Roosevelt, Edward Delafield Smith, and Daniel S. Dickinson.

In 1869, Andrews resigned from his position to go into private practice. In December 1872, he was made First Assistant Corporation Counsel to the City of New York by his former boss, Edward Delafield Smith, who had recently been appointed Corporation Counsel. In 1882 Mayor William Grace made him Corporation Counsel.

In 1883, Andrews was nominated by the Democratic Party as Justice of the New York Supreme Court. He served a full term of 14 years. In 1897, he was nominated for the position by the Republican Party, and lost the election. The following year, he was renominated by the Democratic Party and won. He served until his death in 1902.

== Personal life ==
In 1889 Andrews married Catherine Van Auken, the daughter of his former client, Commodore Cornelius Kingsland Garrison. Garrison had also served as Mayor of San Francisco from 1853 to 1854. Andrews never had any children, however he had a step-daughter, Cornelia Garrison Van Auken, from his wife's previous marriage.

== Death ==
In May 1892, Andrews suffered a stroke and died from a subsequent case of pneumonia on May 24.
