= New York City Law Department =

New York City government agency

Department overview
- Jurisdiction: New York City
- Employees: 1,417 (FY 2026)
- Annual budget: $279.5 million (FY 2026)
- Department executive: Steven Banks, Corporation Counsel (Confirmed)
- Key document: New York City Charter
- Website: www.nyc.gov/law

The New York City Law Department, also known as the Office of the Corporation Counsel, is the department of the government of New York City responsible for most of the city's legal affairs. The department is headed by the Corporation Counsel, Steven Banks, the 83rd official to hold this position, appointed in February 2026.

The Law Department represents the mayor, city agencies, and city officials in all civil litigation, in juvenile delinquency proceedings in Family Court, and in prosecutions in the New York City Criminal Court under the New York City Administrative Code. Among the department's other duties are drafting contracts, leases, municipal bond issues, and other legal documents for the city; reviewing local and state legislation; and providing legal advice to city officials on a wide variety of issues.

The New York City Charter, the New York City Administrative Code, and the Rules of the City of New York are published online by American Legal Publishing Corporation under contract with the Law Department. The department's regulations are compiled in title 46 of the Rules.

== History ==
The origins of the Law Department lie in the English office of the Recorder. After the City fell under British control following the Third Anglo-Dutch War, New York's Governor Thomas Dongan created the Office of Recorder of New York City in 1683 to serve as legal and political counsel to the City Government.

After the American Revolution, New York City continued to grow, and during the 19th century, the City Council began hiring private attorneys to do the internal legal work of the City. When this arrangement proved unsatisfactory, due to the chaos of shifting the city's caseload between various outside counsels, the City Charter was amended in 1849 to create the Office of the Corporation Counsel (so named because New York City is a municipal corporation). The revision established an independently elected chief executive officer known as the Corporation Counsel, and a staff of five, to be known as the Law Department. Later, the Corporation Counsel began being appointed by the Mayor of New York City, as is still the case today.

Among the better-known cases that the department has litigated before the U.S. Supreme Court are Goldberg v. Kelly, Penn Central Transportation Co. v. New York City, Ward v. Rock Against Racism, Massachusetts v. Environmental Protection Agency, Permanent Mission of India v. City of New York, and New York State Rifle & Pistol Association Inc. v. City of New York. The department also prepares amicus curiae briefs in many major court cases.

The following individuals have led the Law Department as Corporation Counsel:

- George Pierce Andrews, former justice of the New York Supreme Court
- Henry Rutgers Beekman, former judge of the New York Supreme Court and New York City Parks Commissioner
- Michael Ulshoeffer, in office 1823-1829.
- James T. Brady, in office 1845-1847.
- Willis Hall, in office 1847-1849.
- Henry E. Davies, in office 1849-1853.
- Robert J. Dillon, in office 1853-1856.
- Lorenzo B. Shepard, in office 1856, former U.S. Attorney for the Southern District of New York
- Richard Busteed, in office 1856-1860, former Federal Judge.
- Greene C. Bronson, in office 1860-1863, former judge of the New York Court of Appeals
- John E. Develin, if office 1863–1866, former member of the New York State Assembly
- Edward D. Smith, former U.S. Attorney for the Southern District of New York
- William C. Whitney, former U.S. Secretary of the Navy
- E. Henry Lacombe, former judge of the United States Court of Appeals for the Second Circuit
- George L. Rives, former United States Assistant Secretary of State
- Francis Key Pendleton, former justice of the Supreme Court of New York
- Frank Polk, in office 1914–1915, former Undersecretary of State and name partner of Davis Polk & Wardwell
- Lamar Hardy, in office 1915–1918 former U.S. Attorney for the Southern District of New York
- John P. O'Brien, former New York City Mayor
- Paul Windels, in office 1934–1937, lawyer, co-founder of the Lycée Français de New York
- Thomas D. Thacher, in office 1943, former judge of the United States District Court for the Southern District of New York, judge of the New York Court of Appeals, and Solicitor General of the United States
- John J. Bennett Jr., in office 1946–1947 former Attorney General of New York
- Adrian P. Burke, in office 1954, former judge of the New York Court of Appeals
- Charles H. Tenney, in office 1958–1961, former judge of the United States District Court for the Southern District of New York
- J. Lee Rankin, in office 1966–1972, former Solicitor General of the United States
- Norman Redlich, in office 1972–1975, former dean of New York University School of Law
- Allen G. Schwartz, in office 1978–1981, former judge of the United States District Court for the Southern District of New York
- Frederick A.O. Schwarz Jr., in office 1982–1986, former chief counsel to the Church Committee
- Peter Zimroth, in office 1987–1989, former NYU professor and law clerk to Justice Abe Fortas of the Supreme Court of the United States
- Victor Kovner, in office 1990–1991
- O. Peter Sherwood, in office 1991–1993, judge, former Solicitor General of New York
- Paul A. Crotty, in office 1994–1997, current judge of the United States District Court for the Southern District of New York
- Michael D. Hess, 1998–2001
- Michael A. Cardozo, in office 2002–2013
- Zachary W. Carter, in office 2014–2019, former United States Attorney for the Eastern District of New York
- Jim Johnson, in office 2019–2021
- Georgia Pestana, in office 2021-2022
- Hon. Sylvia Hinds-Radix, in office 2022-2024
- Muriel Goode-Trufant, in office 2024-2026
- Steven Banks, 2026-present

== Organizational structure ==
The Law Department has 18 legal divisions and 5 support divisions. As of 2023, the department employs 850 lawyers and 750 support professionals in 22 offices located in all five boroughs, and an auxiliary office in Kingston, New York.

The legal divisions are:

- Administrative Law and Regulatory Litigation
- Affirmative Litigation
- Appeals
- Commercial and Real Estate Litigation
- Contracts and Real Estate
- Economic Development
- Ethics and Compliance
- Environmental Law
- Family Court
- General Litigation
- Labor and Employment Law
- Legal Counsel
- Municipal Finance
- Risk Management
- Special Federal Litigation (handles civil rights lawsuits under 42 U.S.C. 1983 brought against police, District Attorneys, or correction officers)
- Tax and Bankruptcy
- Tort
- Workers' Compensation

The support divisions are:

- Administration
- Electronic Discovery Group
- Information Technology
- Litigation Support and Information Management
- Operations
- Law Library

== See also ==
- The City Record
- Rules of the City of New York
- New York State Department of Law
