= Law of New York =

Law of New York may refer to:

- Law of New York (state)
- New York City Administrative Code
