= New York City Office of Collective Bargaining =

New York City government agency

Office of Collective Bargaining
Office overview
- Jurisdiction: New York City
- Key document: New York City Charter
- Website: www.ocb-nyc.org

The New York City Office of Collective Bargaining (OCB) is an agency of the New York City government that regulates labor relations disputes and controversies with city employees, including certification of collective bargaining representatives, mediation, impasse panels, and arbitration. It is similar to the state Public Employment Relations Board (PERB).
