= NYCRR =

NYCRR may refer to:

- New York Central Railroad
- New York Codes, Rules and Regulations
