= Law of New York (state) =

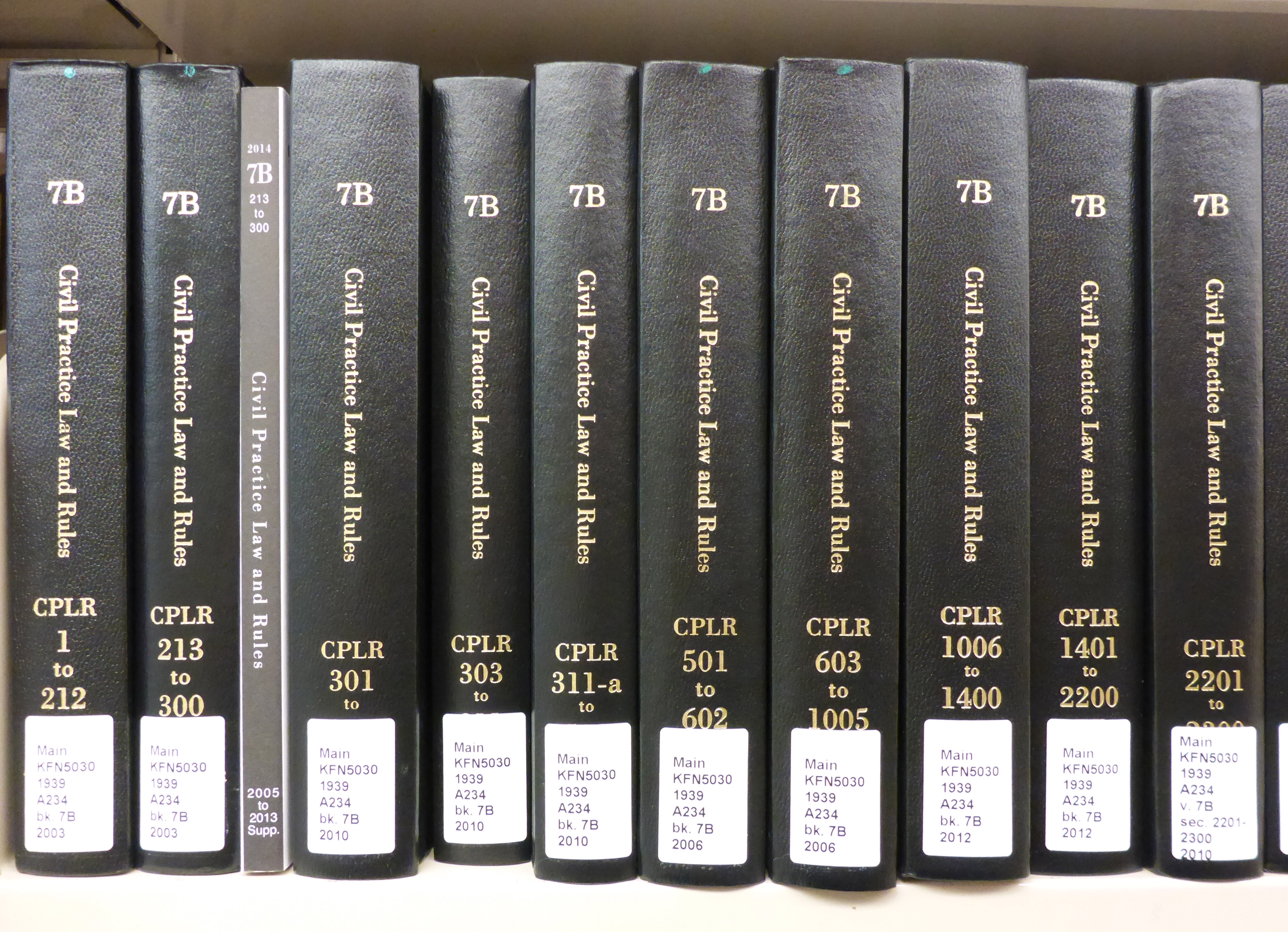
The McKinney's annotated version of the Consolidated Laws of New York (Book 7B, Civil Practice Law and Rules)

The law of New York consists of several levels, including constitutional, statutory, regulatory and case law, and also includes local laws, ordinances, and regulations. The Consolidated Laws form the general statutory law.

The Constitution of New York is the foremost source of state law. The legislation of the Legislature is published in the official Laws of New York and codified in the Consolidated Laws of New York. State agency rules and regulations are promulgated in the New York State Register and codified in the New York Codes, Rules and Regulations. Because New York is a common law state, every opinion, memorandum, and motion sent by the New York Court of Appeals (New York's highest court) and the Appellate Division of the New York Supreme Court (an intermediate appeals court) is published. Each local government may also adopt local laws, and counties, cities, and towns may promulgate ordinances to the extent authorized by state law, e.g. the New York City Administrative Code.

== Constitution ==
All state and municipal powers are derived from the Constitution of New York, which is, in turn, subordinate to the Constitution of the United States and federal laws and treaties, which are the supreme law of the land. As in the U.S. Constitution, legislative power is vested in a bicameral legislature, composed of the New York Assembly and New York State Senate. Judicial power is divided between state and local courts. At the state level, New York's lowest court of general jurisdiction is the New York Supreme Court, which is overseen by 4 appellate divisions and, ultimately, the New York Court of Appeals. Additionally, municipalities are authorized to operate city, town, village, and district courts for low-level matters. New York's executive power is primarily vested in its governor, much as the U.S. Constitution vests executive power in the President. One key difference is that the New York Constitution also vests power directly in the state's Attorney General and Comptroller, since these positions are directly elected; under the U.S. Constitution, the analogous roles are appointed by the President.

== Statutory law ==
Pursuant to the state constitution, the New York State Legislature has enacted legislation, called chapter laws or slip laws when printed separately. The bills, and the concurrent resolutions proposing amendments to the state or federal constitutions, passed in each legislative session are called session laws and are published in the official Laws of New York.

The codification of the permanent laws of a general nature is contained in the Consolidated Laws of New York. New York uses a system called "continuous consolidation" whereby each session law clearly identifies the law and section of the Consolidated Laws affected by its passage. Unlike true codes, the Consolidated Laws are systematic but neither comprehensive nor preemptive, and reference to other laws and case law is often necessary. There also exist unconsolidated laws, such as the various court acts. Unconsolidated laws are uncodified, typically due to their local nature, but are otherwise legally binding.

There are also numerous sources used for statutory interpretation (e.g., legislative intent, legal hermeneutics), including governors' bill, veto, and recall jackets.

== Regulations and administrative law ==
Front page of the New York State Register

Pursuant to certain broadly worded statutes, state agencies and courts have promulgated a large body of rules and regulations (delegated legislation or administrative law). Regulations are promulgated and published in the New York State Register and compiled in the New York Codes, Rules and Regulations (NYCRR).

There are also numerous decisions, opinions, and rulings of state agencies. Extrajudicial courts typically do not have regular reporters of decisions.

== Case law ==
Decisions of the New York Court of Appeals are binding authority on all other courts, and persuasive authority for itself in later cases. Decisions of the New York Supreme Court, Appellate Division department panels are binding on the lower courts, and are persuasive authority for the Court of Appeals and other Appellate Division departments. In the absence of a relevant Appellate Division decision from a trial court's own department, the trial court is bound by the applicable decisions of other departments. Decisions by the Supreme Court, Appellate Term must be followed by courts whose appeals lie to it. Published trial court decisions are persuasive authority for all other courts in the state.

The New York State Courts Electronic Filing System (NYSCEF) is the electronic court filing (e-filing) system. The New York State Reporter of the New York State Law Reporting Bureau is the official reporter of decisions and is required to publish every opinion, memorandum, and motion sent to it by the Court of Appeals and the Appellate Division of the Supreme Court in the New York Reports and Appellate Division Reports, respectively. The trial court and Supreme Court appellate term opinions are published selectively in the Miscellaneous Reports. The most recent decisions are found in the New York Reports 3d (cited as N.Y.3d), the Appellate Division Reports 3d (cited as A.D.3d) and the Miscellaneous Reports 3d (cited as Misc. 3d). Select opinions of the lower courts in the first and second departments are also published in the New York Law Journal.

Although New York has enacted the Uniform Commercial Code, most commercial law in New York outside of the UCC (i.e., most of the law of contracts, torts, and property) is not codified and can only be found in case law. During the second half of the 19th century, New York repeatedly considered and refused to enact a proposed civil code prepared by David Dudley Field II, as a result of James C. Carter's opposition to Field's ideas.

Case law can be more difficult to research than statutory or regulatory law, especially for self-represented litigants. For this reason, California and a few other states moved towards codification of the substantive common law as recommended by Field, with the aim of making the law easier to understand and more accessible. Accurately identifying and arguing the holding of a published judicial opinion, as distinguished from other text in the same opinion that is nonbinding dicta, typically requires years of legal education and experience. However, New York has a large and long-established body of case law, and many legal questions that remain unsettled elsewhere in the United States have long been settled in New York. As a result, New York case law is significant for commercial transactions in the United States. Empirical studies in the early 21st century have repeatedly found that when parties to a commercial contract expressly choose the law of a state or select a particular dispute resolution forum, they most often choose New York. Depending upon the study and the source of the contracts reviewed, Delaware or California usually ranks second.

== Local law ==
Front page of The City Record of New York City

New York is divided into counties, cities, towns, and villages, which are all municipal corporations with their own government. New York City contains no county, town or village governments other than the government of New York City. The Constitution of New York enumerates the powers of local governments, such as the power to elect a legislative body and adopt local laws. Counties, cities, and towns may also promulgate ordinances in addition to laws. A local law has a status equivalent to a law enacted by the Legislature (subject to certain exceptions and restrictions), and is superior to the older forms of municipal legislation such as ordinances, resolutions, rules and regulations.

Each local government (such as counties) must designate a newspaper of notice to publish or describe its laws. The Secretary of State is responsible for publishing local laws online and as a supplement to the Laws of New York. Local laws are not effective until they have been filed with the Secretary of State in the form designated.

With respect to New York City, the codified local laws are contained in the New York City Administrative Code, consisting of 29 titles, and the regulations promulgated by city agencies are contained in the Rules of the City of New York, consisting of 71 titles. The City Record is the official journal (newspaper of notice); it is published each weekday (except legal holidays) and contains legal notices produced by city agencies.

== Treatises ==
There are also several sources of persuasive authority, which are not binding authority but are useful to lawyers and judges insofar as they help to clarify the current state of the law.

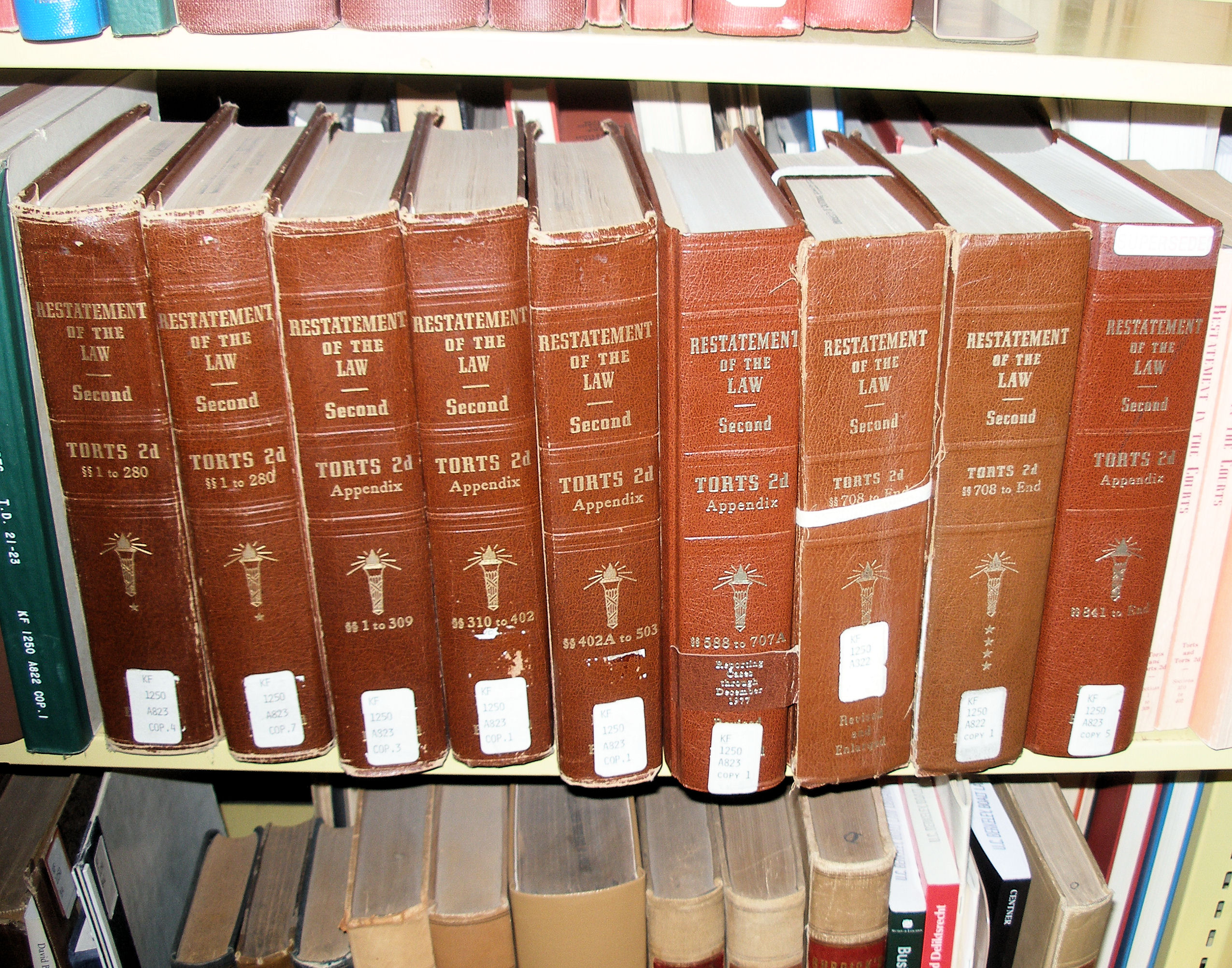
The Restatement (Second) of Torts, an influential treatise summarizing general principles of common law torts

== See also ==
=== Topic ===
- Alcohol laws of New York
- Capital punishment in New York
- New York divorce law
- New York energy law
- Felony murder rule (New York)
- Gun laws in New York
- Necessity defense (New York)
- Molineux hearing
- Motion to dismiss in the interest of justice
- LGBT rights in New York
- Rent control in New York

=== Legislation ===
- Rockefeller Drug Laws
- New York City Human Rights Law
- Libby Zion Law
- Soda Ban

=== Other ===
- Politics of New York
- Law enforcement in New York
- Crime in New York
- Law of the United States

== General and cited references ==
- Gibson, Ellen M.; Manz, William H. (2004). Gibson's New York Legal Research Guide (PDF) (3rd ed.). Wm. S. Hein Publishing. ISBN 1-57588-728-2. LCCN 2004042477. OCLC 54455036.
- Adopting Local Laws in New York State (PDF). James A. Coon Local Government Technical Series. New York State Department of State. May 1998. Archived from the original (PDF) on August 12, 2019.
