= New York City Department of Youth and Community Development =

New York City government agency

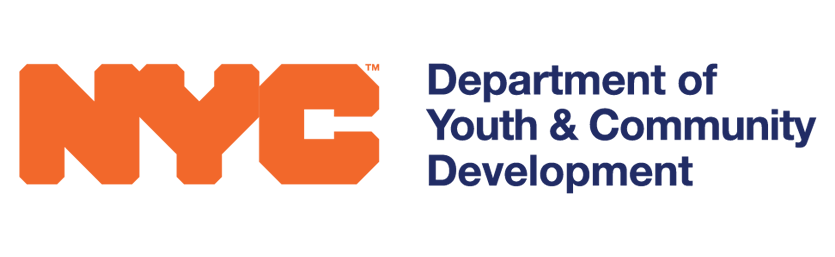

Department overview
- Jurisdiction: New York City
- Headquarters: 2 Lafayette Street, 19th Floor New York, NY 10007
- Employees: 600 (FY 2026)
- Annual budget: $1.53 billion (FY 2026)
- Department executives: Sandra Escamilla-Davies, Commissioner; Alan Cheng, First Deputy Commissioner
- Key document: New York City Charter
- Website: www1.nyc.gov/site/dycd/index.page

The New York City Department of Youth and Community Development (DYCD) is the department of the government of New York City that supports youth and their families through a range of youth and community development programs, and administers city, state and federal funds to community-based organizations.
