= New York City Human Rights Law =

New York City Council
- Territorial extent: New York City
- Enacted by: New York City Council
- Administered by: New York City Commission on Human Rights
- Status: Current legislation

The New York City Human Rights Law (NYCHRL) is a civil rights law that is embodied in Title 8 of the Administrative Code of the City of New York. The law is enforced by the New York City Commission on Human Rights, a mayoral agency of the City of New York. Eight commissioners on the city’s Commission on Human Rights enforce New York City’s Human Rights Law. As NYC mayors appoint commissioners, there is variable enforcement of the law depending on the degree of support and priorities of the City's current administration.

The law prohibits discrimination in employment, housing, and public accommodations based on individuals' characteristics such as race, color, creed (or religion), age, national origin, alienage or citizenship status, gender (including gender identity and sexual harassment), sexual orientation, disability, marital status and family status (such as partnership, parent, and caregiver status).

== Employment protections ==
The law requires employers to make reasonable accommodations for individuals with disabilities, as does federal law. Since 2013, the NYCHRL also requires employers to make certain accommodations for pregnant workers, It provides protection against discrimination in employment based on unemployment status, arrest or conviction record, and status as a victim of domestic violence, stalking, and sex offenses. In 2020 employment discrimination law was expanded to cover freelancers and contractors. The law also protects workers in individual households, such as paid caregivers, and unpaid interns.

== Other protections ==
With respect to access to housing, NYC's human rights law includes protections based on lawful occupation, family status, and any lawful source of income. It also prohibits retaliation, bias-related harassment (including cyberbullying), and bias-related profiling by police affected by systemic racism.

== See also ==
- Human rights commission
- Human rights defender
- LGBT rights in New York
- New York Human Rights Law
- NYC Pride March
