= New York City Procurement Policy Board =

New York City government agency

Procurement Policy Board
Board overview
- Jurisdiction: New York City
- Key document: New York City Charter
- Website: www.nyc.gov/ppb

The New York City Procurement Policy Board (PPB) is an agency of the New York City government that regulates the procurement of goods, services, and construction that uses city money. The board is made up of five members, three appointed by the Mayor and two appointed by the Comptroller.

The PPB was created following the Parking Violations Bureau (PVB) contracting scandal in 1986 and the Supreme Court holding that the Board of Estimate was unconstitutional in 1989. The PPB's goal was to standardize citywide contracting, moving away from a model where city agencies retained discretion to independently interpret applicable procurement laws.
