= Necessity defense in New York =

The Penal Law of the State of New York combines justification and necessity into a single article, Article 35. "Defense of Justification" comprises sections 35.05 through 35.30 of the Penal Law.

== Provision ==
The general provision relating to necessity, section 35.05, provides:

§ 35.05 Justification; generally.

Unless otherwise limited by the ensuing provisions of this article defining justifiable use of physical force, conduct which would otherwise constitute an offense is justifiable and not criminal when:

- Such conduct is required or authorized by law or by a judicial decree, or is performed by a public servant in the reasonable exercise of his official powers, duties or functions; or
- Such conduct is necessary as an emergency measure to avoid an imminent public or private injury which is about to occur by reason of a situation occasioned or developed through no fault of the actor, and which is of such gravity that, according to ordinary standards of intelligence and morality, the desirability and urgency of avoiding such injury clearly outweigh the desirability of avoiding the injury sought to be prevented by the statute defining the offense in issue. The necessity and justifiability of such conduct may not rest upon considerations pertaining only to the morality and advisability of the statute, either in its general application or with respect to its application to a particular class of cases arising thereunder. Whenever evidence relating to the defense of justification under this subdivision is offered by the defendant, the court shall rule as a matter of law whether the claimed facts and circumstances would, if established, constitute a defense.

Under the "choice-of-evils" theory of section 35.05, it is a question of fact for the criminal jury whether the conduct was justified under the circumstances. See People of the State of New York v. Maher, 79 N.Y.2d 978 (1992). As discussed in People of the State of New York v. Gray, 150 Misc. 2d 852 (N.Y. Co. 1991), the defendant is generally held to a "reasonableness" standard—the question is whether a reasonable person in the defendant's position would have reached the conclusion that the relevant conduct was necessary. It is not necessary that the defendant actually avert a greater harm, just that his belief be reasonable. As the court observed:

To apply a strict liability standard in evaluating the other elements of this defense, however, and to find that only those actors who have actually averted a greater harm may avail themselves of the defense, is inconsistent with the law of justification in New York, as well as necessity's basic purpose to promote societal interests.

However, the defendant is subject to strict liability as to which harm is greater. For example, a defendant cannot choose to value property over life.

== Physical force ==
Similarly, when using physical force in defense of a person, the focus of the defense is not on whether the actor was in fact correct that his conduct was necessary to prevent harm, but whether that belief was reasonable. Section 35.15 (1) provides in relevant part:

A person may, subject to the provisions of subdivision two, use physical force upon another person when and to the extent he reasonably believes such to be necessary to defend himself or a third person from what he reasonably believes to be the use or imminent use of unlawful physical force by such other person . . .

Thus, with respect to the example given above, the actor may, provided his belief was reasonable, be entitled to have a defense of justification presented to a jury.

In quoting Graham v. Connor, 490 U.S. 386, 396 (1989), "The right of a law enforcement officer [or a private citizen] to make an arrest necessarily carries with it the right to use some degree of physical coercion or threat thereof to effect it."

== Citizen's arrest ==
There is an important distinction between the defense of justification/necessity under Article 35 and the law of citizen's arrest. In general, to use physical force a private citizen must in fact be correct that a person has committed an offense, while a police officer must only have a reasonable belief.

Apart from the "citizen arrest" statutes of New York, which authorize any "person" to use force necessary to arrest and hold a guilty offender in custody until the police take him, there exists a separate common law/statutory privilege that permits property owners, including shop-keepers and landowners, to restrain or "detain" persons whom they have probable cause to believe have committed or are about to commit violations of their property rights (e.g., by theft or by trespass or property damage):

[G]enerally, restraint or detention [of trespassers and/or of their personal property (e.g. vehicles)], reasonable under the circumstances and in time and manner, imposed for the purpose of preventing another from inflicting personal injuries or interfering with or damaging real or personal property in one's lawful possession or custody is not unlawful. … And although confinement reasonably perceived to be unlawful may invite escape, the person falsely imprisoned is not relieved of the duty of reasonable care for his own safety in extricating himself from the unlawful detention.

— Sindle v. NYCTA, 33 N.Y.2d 293, 307 N.E.2d 245 (1973); Fieldston Prop. Owners Assn. v. City of New York, 16 NY2d 267, 269; Forest Hills Corp v. Kowler, 80 AD2d 630; Forrest Hills Corp. v. Baroth, 147 Misc. 2d 404.

In the event that the defiant guilty intruder is an unknown stranger in an act of malfeasance, a landowner or lawful occupant may choose to invoke his statutory right to "arrest" the intruder and to hold him for, or to "deliver" him promptly to, the Police. CPL 140.30 et. seq.

The privilege of Citizen's Arrest in New York is granted by statute to "any person," and is a right that a land-owner enjoys in addition to his privilege to use force "in defense of premises." (PL s. 35.10(6)). Private persons may only "arrest" those offenders who are in fact guilty of any "offense" (e.g., Trespass PL s 140.05 or ECL 11-2113).

New York Penal Law, sec. 35.30, titled "Justification; use of physical force in making an arrest or in preventing an escape", provides:

4. A private person acting on his own account may use physical force, other than deadly physical force, upon another person when and to the extent that he reasonably believes such to be necessary to effect an arrest or to prevent the escape from custody of a person whom he reasonably believes to have committed an offense [in his presence] and who in fact has committed such offense; and [after giving due notice of the grounds for the arrest] he may use deadly physical force for such purpose when he reasonably believes such to be necessary to:

(a) Defend himself or a third person from what he reasonably believes to be the use or imminent use of deadly physical force; or (b) Effect the arrest of a person who has committed murder, manslaughter in the first degree, robbery, forcible rape or forcible sodomy and who is in immediate flight therefrom

A Canajoharie, New York, car thief's efforts were put in park after a potential victim pressed a shotgun to the criminal's throat. Daniel J. Stetin foiled the crime after awaking for work and discovering his car already running outside. He grabbed a shotgun and went to investigate, while his wife grabbed the telephone and dialed 911. Confronted by an armed and angry Stetin, the crook rested quietly on the ground and waited for police to arrive

— The Sunday Gazette, Schenectady, NY, 5/21/95

The Year 2000 Annual Report of the New York State Police, carried an article, titled "He Sure Picked the Wrong House," featuring a hunter not unwilling to arrest a criminal at gunpoint, and to shoot as "necessary" to defend himself, and as necessary to prevent the escape of the burglar/thief.

== Non-deadly physical force ==
In Black's Law Dictionary (7th Ed.), the definition of "Deadly Force" is:

violent action known to create a substantial risk of causing death or serious bodily harm.

Conversely, the definition of "non-deadly force" is:

force intended to cause only minor bodily harm. 2. A threat of deadly force, such as displaying a knife. (e.g., constructive force).

New York's Penal Law does not expressly define non-deadly "physical force" but does implicitly define non-deadly "physical force" as being "any degree of physical force other than deadly physical force." PL 35.10(6); 35.20(2). "Deadly physical force" is defined in Penal Law s 10.00 (11) as that which is:

readily capable of causing death or other serious (i.e., non-temporary) physical injury.

It is generally Not a "Use" of "Deadly Physical Force" to manually Push, Shove or Strike (e.g., petty "slaps," or "light punches") or to otherwise subject another to physical contact, although there are many risks involved with making any physical contact with a person, and particular circumstances (e.g., a trespasser or a landowner standing at the edge of a cliff when shoved) can increase the risks. Note: a group of people "kicking and punching" a person on the ground has been considered to be a "use of deadly physical force." www.law.cornell.edu/ny/ctap/I96_0028.htm

Maine law follows the same Model Penal code underlying the Penal Law of the state of New York, and teaches: "Nondeadly force is defined as "any physical force which is not deadly force. In Williams, the defendant loaded a handgun, and while holding it, made verbal threats against another individual. The issue was whether the defendant's conduct was deadly force or justified use of nondeadly force .

New York common law has always distinguished between the mere "display" and brandishing or pointing of a gun and the actual use of "deadly force". Thus, the victim of an imminent crime in New York, has always been legally justified under the Common Law to safely display, brandish, or point a firearm as necessary to prevent an imminent injury to person or property.

=== Supreme Court decisions ===
Although the Law of Justification has heretofore been considered a matter of state law, the recent Supreme Court decisions in District of Columbia v. Heller and McDonald v. Chicago, 561 U.S. ___, 130 S.Ct. 3020 (2010) may have constitutionalized some of the Common Law rules of "self-defense" as fundamental rights. The Supreme Court held that each of the Second and Fourteenth Amendments "protects the right to possess a handgun in the home for the purpose of self-defense." And, "stressed that the right was also valued because the possession of firearms was thought to be essential for self-defense. As we put it, self-defense was 'the central component of the right itself." The Constitution, they wrote, secured "the right to keep and bear arms for self-defense."

Prior to these decisions, other Constitutional provisions were recognized as securing a right of self-defense. In Frank v. Maryland, 359 U.S. 360 (1959) the Supreme Court recited the Rights of Englishmen, including the "Right to resist" Unauthorized Deprivations, was incorporated in the Constitution: "In 1761 the validity of the use of the Writs [of Assistance] was contested in the historic proceedings in Boston. James Otis attacked the Writ of Assistance because its use placed 'the liberty of every man in the hands of every petty officer.' [Otis argued: "This Writ is against the fundamental Principles of Law."] His powerful argument so impressed itself first on his audience and later on the People of all the Colonies that President Adams was in retrospect moved to say that 'American Independence was then and there born.' ... [It was therefore recognized that] the broad constitutional proscription [against Unauthorized Deprivation in the Due Process of Law clauses, includes] the right to shut the door on officials of the state unless their entry is under proper authority of law. [AND] self-protection: the right to resist unauthorized [deprivations of Life, Liberty and Property]" http://www.usscplus.com/online/index.asp?case=3590360

Cases or reckless endangerment generally require that the weapon be fired, or at a minimum, capable of firing. The use of the gun must create a risk. Thus, it has been held that shooting a pistol into the air (People v Richardson, 97 AD2d 693, supra) or in the general direction of a roadway but considerably short of it (People v Sallitto, 125 AD2d 345) does not constitute reckless endangerment. In this case, the evidence established that although defendant pulled the trigger his gun did not fire and thus his conduct could not create a risk…." People v. Davis, 72 N.Y.2d 32; 530 N.Y.S.2d 529 (1988)

In People v. Chrysler, 85 N.Y.2d 413, 649 N.E.2d 1162, 626 N.Y.S.2d 18 (1995) (https://www.law.cornell.edu/nyctap/085_0413.htm), the court indicated that pointing a gun that been "rendered inoperable," even temporarily inoperable, is not an endangerment/deadly force situation, but that pointing a gun with your finger on a hair-trigger, such that "any sudden movement by the complainant or defendant could readily have resulted in the accidental discharge of the weapon" does constitute deadly force/endangerment.

In People v. Magliato, 68 NY2d 24 (1986) the NY High Court explained the difference between "the mere display, [a] warning, or preparation for a deadly act" on the one hand, and conduct that "itself constitutes a deadly act." The Court explained that:

Conduct intended merely to scare off an assailant [or intruder] or to keep him at bay may [or may not] place the assailant [or intruder] in such imminent danger of grave bodily injury or death that the conduct, without more [i.e., without actually firing a weapon], may constitute 'the use of deadly physical force.' ... Allegedly protective conduct in drawing and aiming a loaded and cocked weapon [having a "hair trigger" and NO SAFETY such that the "slightest movement" or "extremely light pressure" on the trigger could fire it] but not firing it intentionally ... unquestionably placed [the offender] in the imminent risk of grave danger [i.e., reckless endangerment] and constituted the 'use of deadly physical force.' ... The mere display or brandishing of a pistol may, perhaps, create an insufficient imminent threat to life to be considered the 'use' of deadly physical force. But, leveling a loaded pistol, with the cocked hammer set to release under the slightest pressure, and pointing it at another .... is conduct well beyond a [threat], warning or preparation for a deadly act. Such conduct itself, constitutes a deadly act.

Assumingly, an adult may lawfully carry and use pepper spray "in defense of himself or a third person, or in defense of premises, or in order to prevent larceny of or criminal mischief to property, or in order to effect an arrest or prevent an escape from custody." PL 35.10(6).

== See also ==
- Law of New York
