= New York State Register =

Government gazette of the state of New York

- Front page
- Type: Weekly government gazette
- Publisher: New York State Department of State
- ISSN: 0197-2472
- Website: www.dos.ny.gov/info/register.htm

The New York State Register is the official journal of the New York state government that contains information on proposed regulations and rulemaking activities. The New York State Register is published weekly by the New York State Department of State's Division of Administrative Rules. The general and permanent regulations are compiled in the New York Codes, Rules and Regulations (NYCRR).

The City Record is the official journal of New York City, and the Federal Register is the official journal of the United States government. A separate procurement opportunities newsletter, The New York State Contract Reporter, contains notices of procurement contract opportunities and is published by the state Department of Economic Development (which is operationally integrated into the state Urban Development Corporation).

== See also ==
- New York Codes, Rules and Regulations
- Law of New York
- Federal Register
- The City Record of New York City
