= The City Record =

Official Journal of The City of New York

- "Official Journal of The City of New York"
- Front page
- Type: Daily official journal
- Publisher: New York City Department of Citywide Administrative Services
- Editor: Janae C. Ferreira
- Founded: June 24, 1873; 153 years ago
- Language: English
- Headquarters: Lower Manhattan; 1 Centre Street
- Circulation: 379 daily (print; as of April 2019)
- OCLC number: 6185968
- Website: a856-cityrecord.nyc.gov

The City Record is the official journal of New York City. It is published each weekday (except legal holidays) and contains legal notices produced by city agencies, including notices of proposed and adopted rules, procurement solicitations and awards, upcoming public hearings and meetings, public auctions and property dispositions, and selected court decisions. Despite the publication's importance, long history, and influence—many city projects are required to be announced in the paper—the existence of the Record is not well known.

The codified local laws of NYC are contained in the New York City Administrative Code, and the regulations promulgated by city agencies are compiled in the Rules of the City of New York. Historical issues of The City Record are being digitized by the City Record Project at the NYU Tandon School of Engineering; as of April 2019 the database contains searchable PDFs of issues from the founding of the Record in 1873 through 1947, resulting in a historical source that records every payment and contract of the city, election returns, periodic reports of city agencies, and much more.

The paper was founded in the wake of multiple scandals involving the city government and Tammany Hall; its publication is required by city law (New York City Charter §1066) and ensures that city business meets state law transparency requirements (Consolidated Laws GMU §103 (2)). Eli Blachman has been the paper's editor since 1995. The City Record has been published online (known as CROL) since 2004.

== See also ==
- New York State Register
- Federal Register
- Government of New York City
- Law of New York
