= New York Codes, Rules and Regulations =

New York state rules and regulations

Official Compilation of Codes, Rules and Regulations of the State of New York
- Publisher: New York State Department of State
- OCLC: 12613551

The New York Codes, Rules and Regulations (NYCRR) contains New York state rules and regulations. The NYCRR is officially compiled by the New York State Department of State's Division of Administrative Rules. It is the state equivalent to the federal Code of Federal Regulations and the city New York City Rules.

== Contents ==
Titles of the NYCRR
Title #	State department	Number of volumes
1	Agriculture and Markets	2 volumes
2	Audit and Control	1 volume
3	Banking	1 volume
4	Civil Service	1 volume
5	Economic Development	1 volume
6	Environmental Conservation	15 volumes
7	Correctional Services	1 volume
8	Education	4 volumes
9	Executive	11 volumes
10	Health	7 volumes
11	Insurance	4 volumes
12	Labor	5 volumes
13	Law	1 volume
14	Mental Hygiene	3 volumes
15	Motor Vehicles	1 volume
16	Public Service	3 volumes
17	Transportation	3 volumes
18	Social Services	4 volumes
19	State	2 volumes
20	Taxation and Finance	3 volumes
21	Miscellaneous	4 volumes
22	Judiciary	5 volumes
23	Financial Services	1 volume

== See also ==
- New York State Register
- Rules of New York City
- Law of New York
- Code of Federal Regulations
