= Edward Delafield Smith =

American lawyer

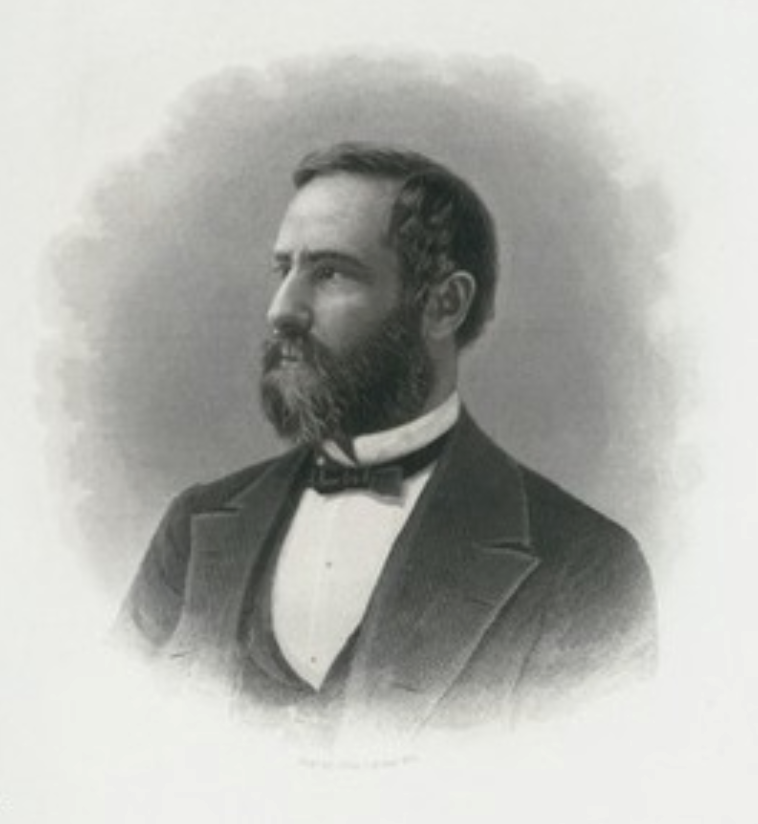

United States Attorney for the Southern District of New York
- In office April 1861 – April 1865
- President: Abraham Lincoln
- Preceded by: James I. Roosevelt
- Succeeded by: Daniel S. Dickinson

Personal details
- Born: May 8, 1826 Rochester, New York, U.S.
- Died: April 12, 1878 (aged 51) Shrewsbury, New Jersey, U.S.
- Party: Republican
- Relatives: James Smith Bush (cousin)

Edward Delafield Smith (May 8, 1826 – April 12, 1878) was an American lawyer who served as United States Attorney for the Southern District of New York during the American Civil War.

== Career ==
At 33 years old, Smith was appointed federal attorney for New York City by Abraham Lincoln. His most famous case was in 1862, when he oversaw the prosecution of slave trader Nathaniel Gordon. Gordon, who was captured in 1860 under the previous administration of James Buchanan, had had the prosecution of his case delayed by then District Attorney James I. Roosevelt. When Smith assumed his post in April 1861, he found that Gordon had been in custody for some time in the relative comfort of the Eldridge Street jail, with no plans to bring a trial. As a result, Smith had Gordon moved to the Tombs. At the time, Smith was determined to help stop the slave trade and saw the case as an opportunity to set an example for all future slave traders. Smith pushed for a death sentence for Gordon and won. Gordon was sentenced to death, and executed in 1862. Later on, he also prosecuted John Andrews, leader of the New York City draft riots.

A staunch unionist and Republican, Smith helped to found the Union League of New York and the Union Defense Committee.

From 1871 to 1875, he served as Corporation Counsel for New York City.

== Personal life ==
Edward was a direct descendant of the early American colonist Daniel Smith of Watertown, Massachusetts. He was the second cousin of attorney James Smith Bush.
