= New York State Department of State =

Department of the New York state government

Department of State
- Seal

- Logo

Department overview
- Formed: 1778; 248 years ago
- Jurisdiction: New York
- Headquarters: One Commerce Plaza, 99 Washington Avenue, Albany, New York, U.S.
- Annual budget: $384.09 million (FY 2025)
- Department executive: Walter T. Mosley, Secretary of State
- Child department: New York State Athletic Commission
- Key document: Executive Law, Article 6
- Website: dos.ny.gov

The New York State Department of State (NYSDOS) is the department of the New York state government under the leadership of the Secretary of State of New York. Its regulations are compiled in title 19 of the New York Codes, Rules and Regulations.

== Structure ==
The NYSDOS includes the:

- Office of Administrative Hearings (OAH), which conducts hearings for the professions and occupations regulated by the NYSDOS;
- Division of Administrative Rules (DAR), which produces the weekly New York State Register that provides information on the rule making activities of state agencies, is the official compiler of the New York Codes, Rules and Regulations (NYCRR), and publishes information on the Great Seal of New York, the State Constitution, and other official state documents;
- Division of Cemeteries, which regulates cemeteries;
- Division of Community Services, which is responsible for Community Service Block Grant (CSBG) administration, including the distribution of New York's federal CSBG allocation;
- Division of Consumer Protection, previously the New York State Consumer Protection Board, which provides direct assistance and intervention to resolve marketplace complaints, mitigates the consequences of identity theft and frauds, advocates for greater consumer rights and remedies before state and federal regulators, represents consumers at utility rate and policy proceedings before state and federal regulators, and ensures businesses are afforded direction and support to maintain fair and honest transactional practices to inspire customer trust;
- Division of Corporations, State Records and Uniform Commercial Code, which examines, files, and maintains numerous documents vital to business and state government including state and local laws, oaths of office, trademarks, certificates of incorporation, Uniform Commercial Code Article 9 financing statements, and the authentication of public documents for use in other countries;
- Division of Licensing Services (DLS), which oversees the licensure, registration, and regulation of 32 occupations, including real estate brokers and real estate appraisers, notaries public, private investigators, and cosmetologists;
- Division of Local Government Services (LG), which provides training and technical assistance to local governments and community organizations in areas such as fire prevention, coastal management, and code enforcement, and helps local officials to solve problems involving basic powers and duties, public works, municipal organization, planning, land use and regulatory controls, and community development;
- Office of Planning and Development (OPD), which includes the
  - Division of Planning;
  - Division of Development;
  - Division of Building Standards and Codes (BSC), previously the Division of Code Enforcement and Administration (DCEA), which administers the mandatory statewide Uniform Fire Prevention and Building Code (Uniform Code) and State Energy Conservation Construction Code (Energy Code); and
  - Division of Technical Assistance; and
- Office of General Counsel.

The NYSDOS also includes and participates in several committees and commissions, including the:

- Amistad Commission, which reviews state curriculum regarding the slave trade;
- Appalachian Regional Commission (ARC), a regional economic development agency that represents a partnership of federal, state, and local government;
- Authorities Budget Office (ABO), which oversees and provides training and technical assistance to New York state public-benefit corporations and authorities;
- New York State Athletic Commission, which regulates combat sports such as boxing and professional wrestling;
- Committee on Open Government, which oversees and advises the government, public, and news media on Freedom of Information, Open Meetings, and Personal Privacy Protection Laws;
- Lake George Park Commission, which oversees and manages Lake George Park;
- Tug Hill Commission, which manages Tug Hill; and
- Watershed Protection and Partnership Council (WPPC), which provides a regional forum concerning the New York City Watershed.

== See also ==
- New York City Department of Consumer and Worker Protection
