= Corporation counsel =

Municipal counsel in the United States

The corporation counsel is the title given to the chief legal officer who handles civil claims against the city in some U.S. municipal and county jurisdictions, including negotiating settlements and defending the city when it is sued. Most corporation counsel do not prosecute criminal cases, but some prosecute traffic and local ordinance violations. In Washington, D.C., the former corporation counsel, now known as the attorney general, prosecutes juvenile delinquency cases in addition to traffic and local ordinance violations.

In New York City, the corporation counsel, in addition to handling all civil litigation on behalf of the city, prosecutes juvenile delinquency proceedings.

The cities of New York, Chicago, and Boston, among others, use this title. Counties in Hawaii and Wisconsin have a corporation counsel as well.

In some jurisdictions, such as Ohio, the county prosecuting attorney is, by law, corporation counsel for the county and other governmental entities in the county.

== See also ==
- City attorney
- General counsel
- New York City Law Department
