= New York City Rules =

Rules and regulations of New York City government agencies

Official Compilation of the Rules of the City of New York
- Author: Corporation Counsel of New York City
- Publisher: American Legal Publishing
- OCLC: 53988784

The Rules of the City of New York (RCNY) contains the compiled rules and regulations (delegated legislation) of New York City government agencies. It contains approximately 6,000 rules and regulations in 71 titles, each covering a different city agency. The City Record is the official journal of New York City.

== See also ==
- List of New York City agencies
- New York City Administrative Code
- The City Record
- Government of New York City
- New York Codes, Rules and Regulations
- Law of New York
