= New York City Administrative Code =

Book containing the laws of New York City

New York City Charter and Administrative Code
- Publisher: New York Legal Publishing Corporation
- OCLC: 2431094

The Administrative Code of the City of New York contains the codified local laws of New York City as enacted by the New York City Council and Mayor. As of October 2026, it contains 37 titles, numbered 1 through 16, 16-A, 16-B, 17 through 20, 20-A, 21, 21-A, and 22 through 33.

The Constitution of New York enumerates the powers of local governments, such as the power to elect a legislative body and adopt local laws. A local law has a status equivalent with a law enacted by the Legislature (subject to certain exceptions and restrictions), and is superior to the older forms of municipal legislation such as ordinances, resolutions, rules and regulations.

== See also ==
- Rules of the City of New York
- New York City Legislative Annual
- New York City Report
- New York City Charter
- Local Laws of the Cities in the State of New York
- Local Laws of New York City
- The City Record
- Government of New York City
- Consolidated Laws of New York
- Laws of New York
- Law of New York
