= New York City Charter =

Municipal document enacted 1898

New York State Legislature
- Long title: Charter of the City of New York
- Territorial extent: New York City
- Enacted by: New York State Legislature
- Enacted: January 1, 1898
- Commenced: January 1, 1898

Amended by
- 1898 New York City Charter revisions; 1901 New York City Charter revisions; 1938 New York City Charter revisions; 1963 New York City Charter revisions; 1975 New York City Charter revisions; 2020 New York City Charter revisions
- Status: Current legislation

The New York City Charter is the municipal charter of New York City. It establishes the basic framework of New York City government, including the elective offices of the mayor, comptroller, public advocate, and members of the City Council. It also enumerates the powers and duties of those officers and many appointed officials, such as the commissioners of city agencies. In contrast, more detailed local laws and regulations governing New York City are typically found in the New York City Administrative Code and the Rules of the City of New York. As of November 2025, the New York City Charter includes a non-numbered introductory chapter, plus chapters identified by a number (1 through 79) or a number plus a letter suffix.

The modern charter's origins correspond with the establishment of Greater New York. As part of the 1898 consolidation of New York City, the New York State Legislature enacted a charter for the consolidated city (Laws of 1897, chapter 378, effective January 1, 1898). The charter is in a large measure the re-enactment of the New York City Consolidation Act of 1882, and it embraces many features of the charter of the city of Brooklyn of 1880. The charter was amended periodically and throughout the twentieth century and overhauled in 1989, after the New York City Board of Estimate had been declared unconstitutional, to redistribute power from the Board of Estimate to the mayor and City Council.

== Charter revisions ==
The charter is periodically revised, generally via a charter commission including revisions that took place in 1898, 1901, 1938, 1963, 1975, and 2020.

The 1938 revision replaced the New York City Board of Aldermen with the New York City Council, and it also created the New York City Planning Commission.

The 1963 revision of the New York City Charter extended the Borough of Manhattan's Community Planning Councils (est. 1951) to the outer boroughs as Community Planning Boards, which are now known as Community Boards. This revision also increased the size of the New York City Council from 25 members to 35.

The 1975 revision of the New York City Charter set the number of Community Districts/Boards to 59, established the position of the district manager for the community districts, and created the Uniform Land Use Review Procedure (ULURP) which gave the community boards the authority to review land use proposals such as zoning actions, and special permits.

The 2020 revision included 19 ballot proposals, combined into 5 questions, all of which were approved in the general election on November 5, 2019. These revisions included the implementation of ranked choice voting beginning in 2021 for New York City municipal elections, the expansion of the powers and size of the New York City Civilian Complaint Review Board, an update to ethics rules for former city officials and members of the New York City Conflicts of Interest Board, changes to the city's annual budget process, and an extension in the time allocated to Community Boards and Borough Presidents to review proposed land use changes as part of the ULURP.

== Mayoral inability ==
The New York City Charter’s section on succession establishes a committee on mayoral inability, whose responsibilities include determining whether or not the mayor is temporarily or permanently unable to discharge the powers and duties of the office:

(a) There shall be a committee on mayoral inability consisting of: the corporation counsel, the comptroller, the speaker of the council, a deputy mayor who shall be designated by the mayor, and the borough president with the longest consecutive service as borough president. If two or more borough presidents have served for an equal length of time, one of such borough presidents shall be selected by lot to be a member of such committee. If at any time there is no valid mayoral designation in force, the deputy mayor with the longest consecutive service as a deputy mayor shall be a member of such committee. The authority to act as a member of such committee shall not be delegable.
(b) Such committee by affirmative declaration of no fewer than four of its members shall have the power to make the declarations described in paragraphs four and five of this subdivision. No such declaration shall be effective unless signed by all the members making it.

— New York City Charter, § 10(d)(2)

On February 17, 2025, Comptroller Brad Lander released a public letter to Mayor Eric Adams threatening to convene a meeting of the Inability Committee if Mayor Adams does not "develop and present a detailed contingency plan outlining how you intend to manage the City of New York."

== Gallery ==
The Greater New York charter (1897)

The New York city charter (1900)

The Charter of the City of New York (1904)

The charter of New York City (1909)

== See also ==
- New York City Administrative Code
- New York City Rules
- Board of Estimate of City of New York v. Morris
