= Government of New York City =

Government of the City of New York
- Seal of New York City
- Formation: December 16, 1665; 360 years ago
- City charter: New York City Charter
- Website: nyc.gov

City-wide elected officials
- Public Advocate: New York City Public Advocate
- Comptroller: New York City Comptroller

Legislative branch
- Legislature: New York City Council
- Meeting place: New York City Hall

Executive branch
- Mayor: New York City Mayor
- Appointed by: Election
- Departments: See List of New York City agencies

Judicial branch
- Seat: New York City Hall

The government of New York City, headquartered at New York City Hall in Lower Manhattan, is organized under the New York City Charter and provides for a mayor-council system. The mayor is elected to a four-year term and is responsible for the administration of city government. The New York City Council is a unicameral body consisting of 51 members, each elected from a geographic district, normally for four-year terms. Primary elections for local offices use ranked choice voting, while general elections use plurality voting. All elected officials are subject to a two consecutive-term limit. The court system consists of two citywide courts and three statewide courts.

New York City's government employs approximately 300,000 people, more than any other city in the United States and more than any U.S. state but three: California, Texas, and New York. The city government is responsible for public education, correctional institutions, public safety, recreational facilities, sanitation, water supply, and welfare services.

New York City consists of five boroughs, each coextensive with one of five counties of New York State: Brooklyn is Kings County, the Bronx is Bronx County, Manhattan is New York County, Queens is Queens County, and Staten Island is Richmond County. When New York City was consolidated into its present form in 1898, all previous town and county governments within it were abolished in favor of the present five boroughs and a unified, centralized city government. However, each county retains its own district attorney to prosecute crimes, and most of the court system is organized around the counties. Because of this, New York City is not considered to be an independent city nor a consolidated city-county, as it technically encompasses multiple counties which each have limited autonomy. Rather, the municipal structure of New York City exists in a category of its own (sui generis). Each borough also has an elected borough president, which is a largely ceremonial office.

New York City is divided between two federal judicial districts. Bronx County and New York County are in the Southern District while Kings County, Queens County, and Richmond County are in the Eastern District, although both districts have concurrent jurisdiction over the waters in their respective districts.

== Executive branch ==
The executive branch of New York City consists of the Mayor, and numerous departments, boards and commissions. The Mayor also appoints several deputy mayors to head major offices within the executive branch of the city government. The City Record is the official journal published each weekday (except legal holidays) containing legal notices produced by city agencies, and regulations are compiled in the Rules of the City of New York.

=== Mayor ===
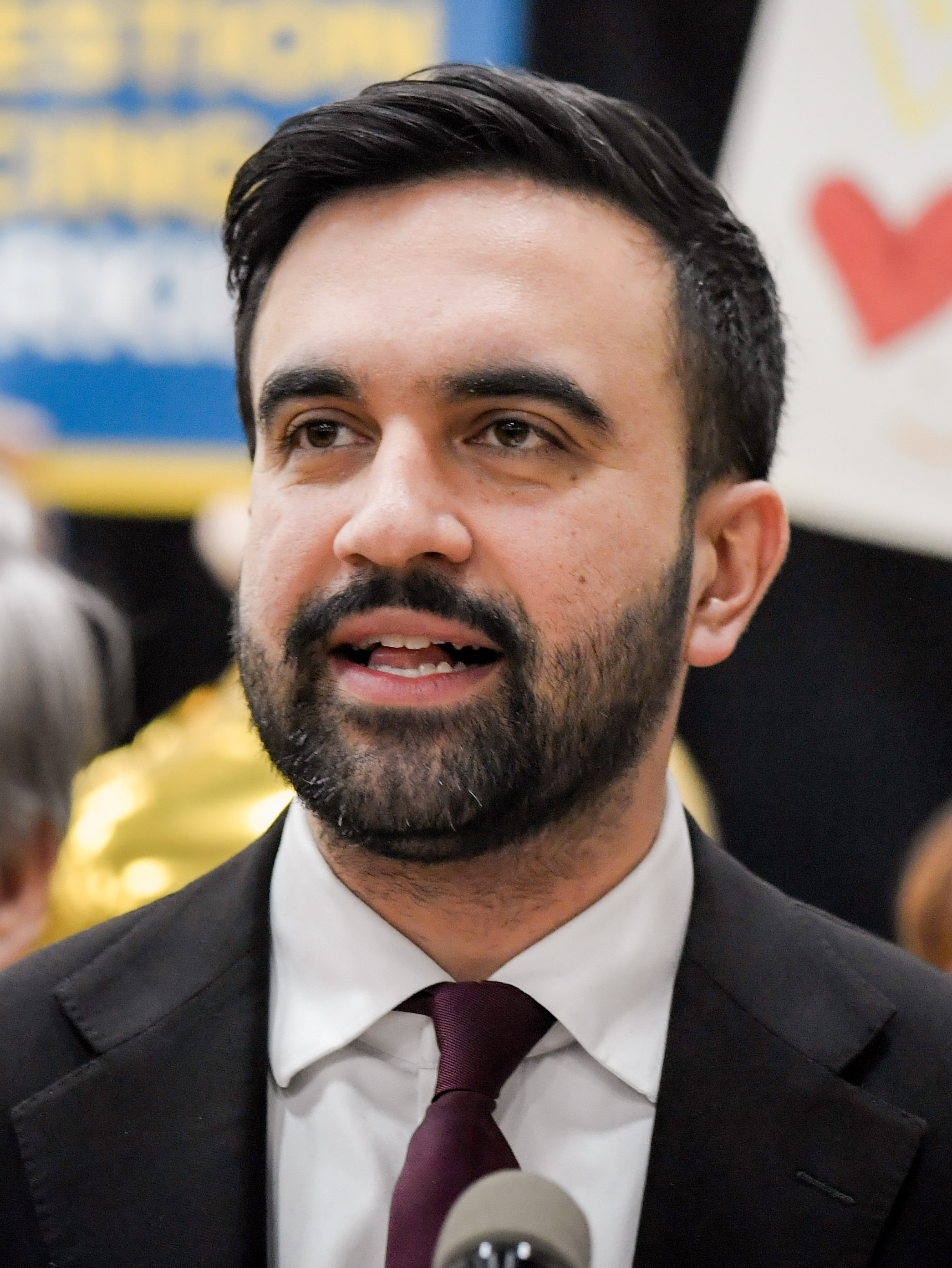
Mayor Zohran Mamdani

The mayor is the chief executive officer of the city and a magistrate, is the authority that appoints and removes all unelected officers and exercises all the powers vested in the city except otherwise provided by law, and is responsible for the effectiveness and integrity of city government operations. The mayor is directly elected by popular vote for a four-year term. The mayor is also responsible for creating the city's budget through the New York City Mayor's Office of Management and Budget, submitted for approval, not drafting, to the Council.

== Other citywide offices ==
The mayor, public advocate and comptroller are the only three directly elected citywide officials in New York City.

=== Public Advocate ===
The public advocate is an elected official with responsibility to ease public relations with the government, investigate complaints regarding city agencies, mediate disputes between city agencies and citizens, serve as the city's ombudsman and advise the mayor on community relations. The public advocate is a member of the Council. The public advocate stands first in line of succession to the mayoralty.

=== Comptroller ===
The comptroller conducts performance and financial audits of all city agencies, serves as a fiduciary to the city's five public pension funds totaling nearly $160 billion in assets, provides comprehensive oversight of the city's budget and fiscal condition, reviews city contracts for integrity, accountability and fiscal compliance, manages the fair, efficient and effective resolution of claims against the city, ensures transparency and accountability in the prevailing wage rate-setting process and enforces prevailing wage and living wage laws. The comptroller stands second, after the public advocate, in line to succeed a mayor who has become unable to serve.

=== Non-mayoral agencies ===
There are also numerous commissions, boards, tribunals and offices that are independent of the mayor's office.

== Legislative branch ==
Legislative power in the City of New York is vested in the New York City Council. The New York State Constitution empowers local governments to adopt local laws in addition to ordinances, resolutions, rules and regulations. The codified local laws of New York City are contained in the New York City Administrative Code.

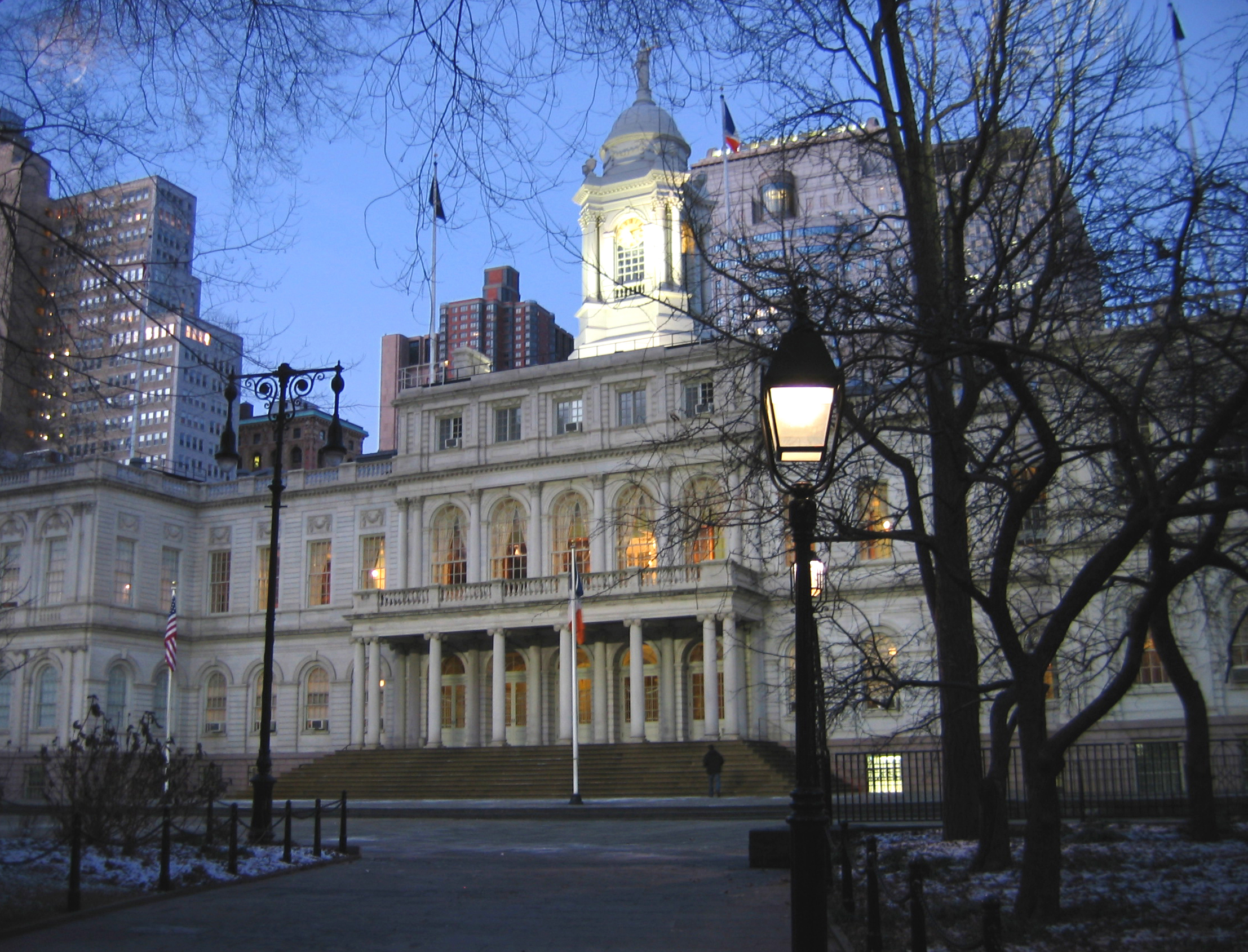
New York City Hall, the seat of city government

The Council is a unicameral body consisting of 51 Council members, whose districts are defined by geographic population boundaries that each contain approximately 157,000 people. Council members are elected every four years, except that after every census held in years divisible by twenty, districts are redrawn, requiring two consecutive two-year terms, the second of which is held in the redrawn districts. The Speaker of the Council, selected by the 51 Council members, is often considered the second most powerful post in New York City's government after the Mayor.

Bills passed by a simple majority are sent to the mayor, who may sign them into law. If the mayor vetoes a bill, the Council has 30 days to override the veto by a two-thirds majority vote. A local law has a status equivalent with a law enacted by the New York State Legislature (subject to certain exceptions and restrictions), and is superior to the older forms of municipal legislation such as ordinances, resolutions, rules and regulations.

The Council has several committees with oversight of various functions of the city government. Each council member sits on at least three standing, select or subcommittees. The standing committees meet at least once per month. The Speaker of the Council, the Majority Leader, and the Minority Leader are all ex officio members of every committee.

Prior to 1990, the city also had a powerful Board of Estimate, a unique legislative-executive hybrid. Although it could not pass laws, it shared authority for the city budget with the council and controlled functions such as land use, municipal contracts, franchises, and water and sewer rates. The Board's membership consisted of the mayor, comptroller, president of the City Council, and the five borough presidents. The three citywide officials each cast two votes, and the borough presidents one each. In 1989, the Supreme Court of the United States struck down the Board of Estimate as violating the principle of "one man, one vote", due to the dramatically unequal numbers of constituents being represented by each borough president. The city subsequently adopted its current arrangement by referendum.

== Courts ==
The state court system in New York City has two citywide courts, the Criminal Court and the Civil Court, and several statewide courts, the Supreme Court, Surrogate's Court, and Family Court. Unlike the rest of New York, New York City counties do not have a typical County Court. Each statewide court is located in each of New York City's five counties (boroughs). There are also numerous extrajudicial administrative courts such as OATH, which are executive agencies and not part of the state Unified Court System.

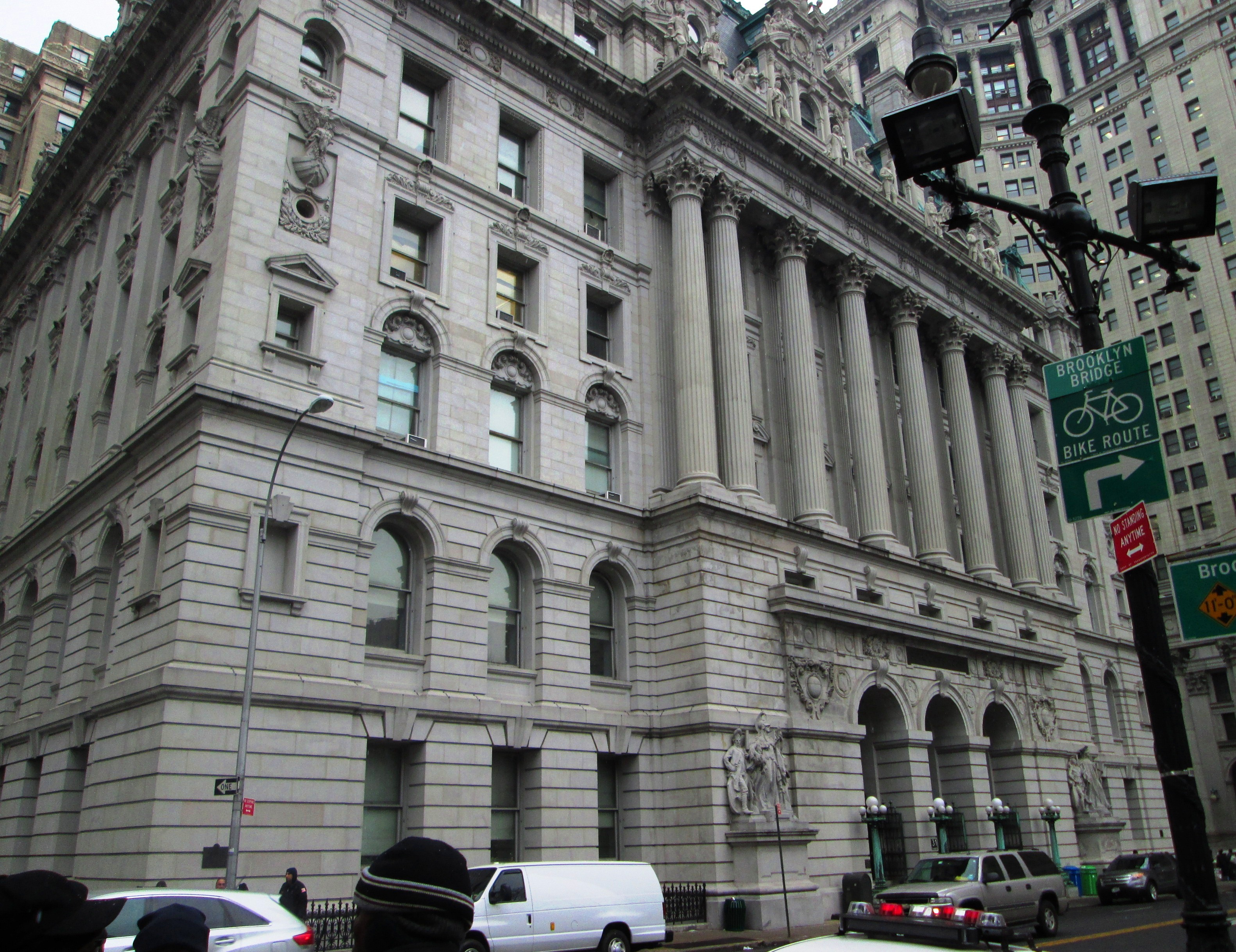
The Surrogate's Courthouse containing courtrooms for the Surrogate's Court for New York County

The Criminal Court of the City of New York handles summons court appearance tickets, violations, misdemeanors (generally, crimes punishable by fine or imprisonment of up to one year), and conducts arraignments (initial court appearances following arrest) and preliminary hearings in felony cases.

The Civil Court of the City of New York includes Housing Court for landlord-tenant matters, Small Claims Court for cases involving amounts up to $5000, and generally has jurisdiction for damages up to $25,000. It handles about 25% of all the New York state and local courts' total filings. There are also several extrajudicial administrative courts, e.g. the Office of Administrative Trials and Hearings (OATH) adjudicates matters for city agencies unless otherwise provided for by law, and the city Parking Violations Bureau adjudicates parking violations.

The Supreme Court of the State of New York is the trial court of general jurisdiction, which in New York City hears felony cases and major civil cases. (Lesser criminal and civil cases are heard in the Criminal Court and Civil Court, respectively.) The Family Court of the State of New York is a family court that hears cases involving children and families. The Surrogate's Court of the State of New York is the probate court which oversees the probate of wills and administers estates.

== Borough and community government ==
New York City is composed of five boroughs or counties, collectively comprising 59 community districts.

=== Borough presidents ===
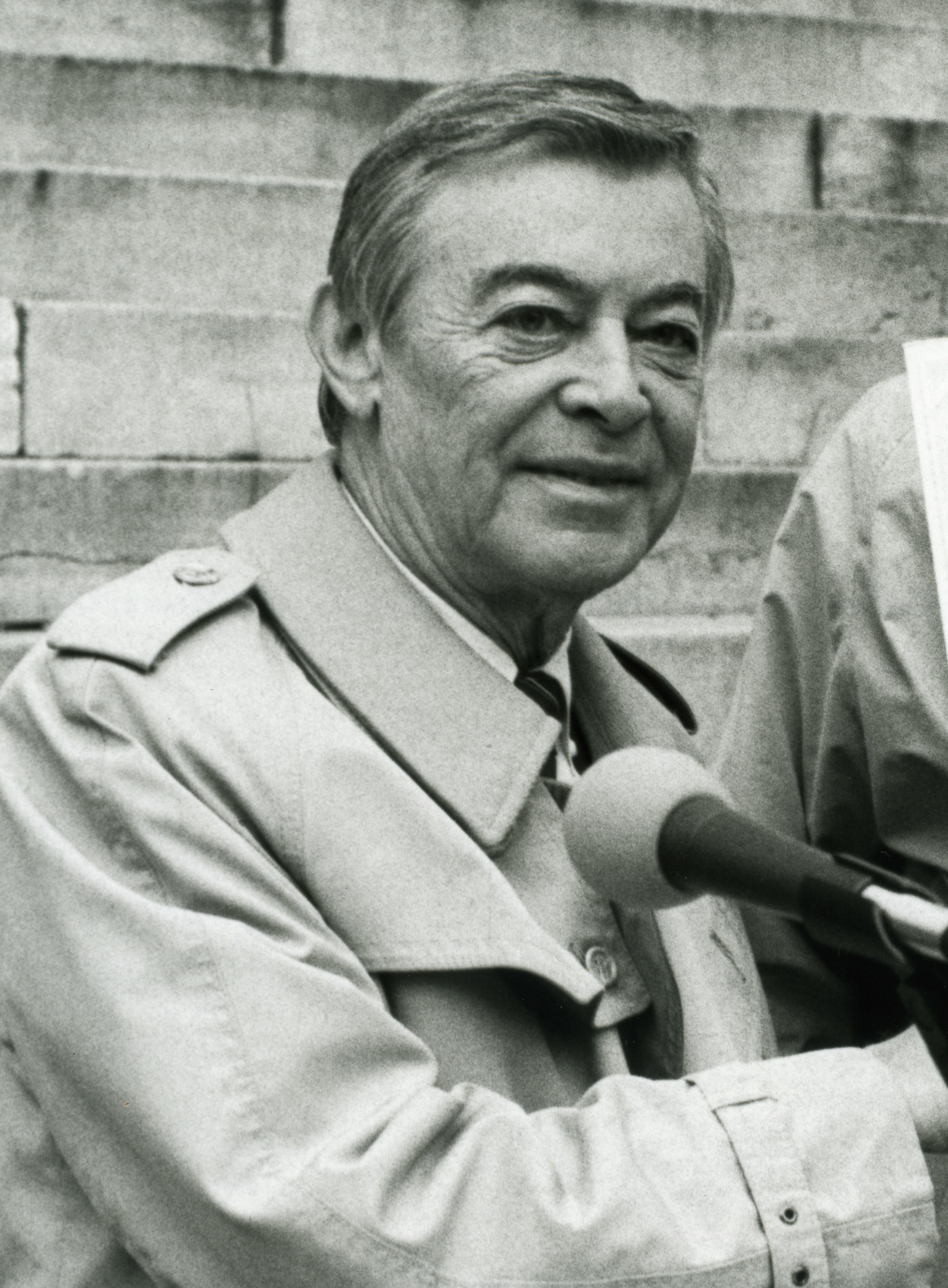
Howard Golden, borough president of Brooklyn, 1977–2001

Each of the five boroughs has an elected borough president. Borough presidents are elected by popular vote to four-year terms and can serve up to two consecutive terms (eight years). They can have legislation introduced in the council, recommend capital projects, hold public hearings on matters of public interest, make recommendations to the mayor and to other city officials, make recommendations on land use and planning, and make recommendations regarding the performance of contracts providing for the delivery of services, in the interests of the people of their borough. They advise the mayor of New York City, comment on land-use items in their borough, advocate borough needs in the annual municipal budget process, appoint some officials and community board members, and serve ex officio as members of various boards and committees. They generally act as advocates for their boroughs to mayoral agencies, the city council, the New York State government, public corporations, and private businesses. Their authorizing law is codified in title 4, sections 81 to 85 of the New York City Charter, while their regulations are compiled in title 45 of the New York City Rules.

The two major remaining appointments of the borough presidents are one member each on the New York City Planning Commission and two members each of the New York City Panel for Educational Policy. Borough presidents generally adopt specific projects to promote while in office, but since 1990 have been mainly ceremonial leaders. Borough presidents influence the Uniform Land Use Review Procedure (ULURP) by appointing community boards and voting on the applications. The staff of boroughwide economic development corporations are often closely aligned with the borough president, and work closely with the New York City Economic Development Corporation, the primary coordinating agency of city-sponsored economic development.

For most of the city's history, the office exercised significant executive powers within each borough, and the five borough presidents also sat on the Board of Estimate. After it was disbanded in 1990, the borough presidents were stripped of a majority of their powers in the government of New York City.

==== History ====
On January 1, 1898, the five offices of borough president were created to administer many of the previous responsibilities of the mayors of Brooklyn and Long Island City, the executive branch functions of the towns in Queens and Richmond, and various county functions.

The initial city charter established the five borough president offices with terms of four years, coinciding with the term of the mayor. The salaries of the presidents of Manhattan, the Bronx, and Brooklyn were $5,000, and those of Queens and Richmond were $3,000. The borough presidents were subject to removal for cause by the mayor, with approval by the governor, and a replacement elected by the borough's aldermen and councilmen. Powers included membership and voting on their borough's local boards (although without veto powers), an office in the borough hall, and appointive powers for a secretary, assistants, and clerks, which quickly became a source of political patronage. Along with the mayor, the comptroller and the president of the City Council, each of whom had two votes, the borough presidents each had one vote on the New York City Board of Estimate, which decided matters ranging from budgets to land use.

In a later writer's words, the offices of the borough presidents were created to preserve "local pride and affection for the old municipalities" after consolidation. Upon the formation of the unicameral Board of Aldermen in 1902, borough presidents were each entitled to a seat on the Board.

Borough presidents gradually gained more authority, assisting in the formulation of more aspects of the city budget and controlling land use, contracts, and franchise powers. Officials of political parties sometimes rewarded faithful public servants with nomination to the borough president position in primary elections, or election of an interim borough president via the aldermen or councilmen whose votes they controlled, in return for political patronage. Although some borough presidents served for decades, the position was sometimes used as a stepping-stone to other elective offices such as judgeships or, in the case of Robert F. Wagner, Jr., mayor.

In February 1965 Constance Baker Motley was elected as borough president of Manhattan. She was the first woman and third African-American to hold the office of borough president.

On March 22, 1989, the Supreme Court of the United States, in Board of Estimate of City of New York v. Morris (489 U.S. 688) unanimously declared the New York City Board of Estimate, which had no parallel anywhere else in the United States, unconstitutional. The ruling was made on the grounds that Brooklyn, the city's most populous borough, with a population of 2.2 million at the time, had the same representation on the board as Staten Island, the city's least populous borough, with 350,000 residents. Therefore, the Board of Estimate was a violation of the Fourteenth Amendment's Equal Protection Clause pursuant to the high court's 1964 "one man, one vote" decision. In response to the Supreme Court's decision, the New York City Charter Revision Commission drew up changes to the municipal government, which were approved by 55% to 45% in a citywide referendum on election day, November 1989. A month later, the changes were approved by the United States Department of Justice.

The offices of the borough presidents have been retained with greatly reduced power. The borough budgets became the responsibility of the mayor and City Council. Borough presidents currently have a relatively small discretionary budget for projects within their boroughs. The last significant power of the borough presidents, to appoint members of the New York City Board of Education, was abolished when the Board of Education became the Department of Education on June 30, 2002.

==== Current borough presidents ====
The current borough presidents were either elected or re-elected in the most recent election in 2025:

Borough	Name	Start	Party
The Bronx	Vanessa Gibson (term-limited)	January 1, 2022	Democratic
Brooklyn	Antonio Reynoso (term-limited)	January 1, 2022	Democratic
Manhattan	Brad Hoylman-Sigal	January 1, 2026	Democratic
Queens	Donovan Richards (term-limited)	December 2, 2020	Democratic
Staten Island	Vito Fossella (term-limited)	January 1, 2022	Republican

Map of community districts in the City of New York The Bronx Brooklyn Manhattan Queens Staten Island

=== Borough boards ===
Each of the five boroughs has a borough board. They are composed of the borough president, Council members from the borough, and the chairperson of each community board in the borough. The borough boards can hold or conduct public or private hearings, adopt by-laws, prepare comprehensive and special purpose plans and make recommendations for land use and planning, mediate disputes and conflicts among two or more community boards, submit a comprehensive statement of the expense and capital budget priorities and needs, evaluate the progress of capital developments and the quality and quantity of services provided by agencies, and otherwise consider the needs of the borough.

=== Community boards ===
Each of the fifty-nine community districts has a community board composed of up to 50 volunteer members appointed by the local borough president, half from nominations by Council members representing the community district (i.e., whose council districts cover part of the community district). Community boards advise on land use and zoning, participate in the city budget process, and address service delivery in their district. Community boards act in an advisory capacity, wielding no official authority to make or enforce laws.

== State and county government ==
=== District attorneys ===
Each of the five counties of New York City elects a district attorney (DA) for a four-year term, whose duty it is to prosecute all crimes and offenses cognizable by the courts of the county. There is also a sixth DA, the Office of the Special Prosecutor for Narcotics, who is unelected, but appointed by the five elected DAs.

=== Public authorities ===
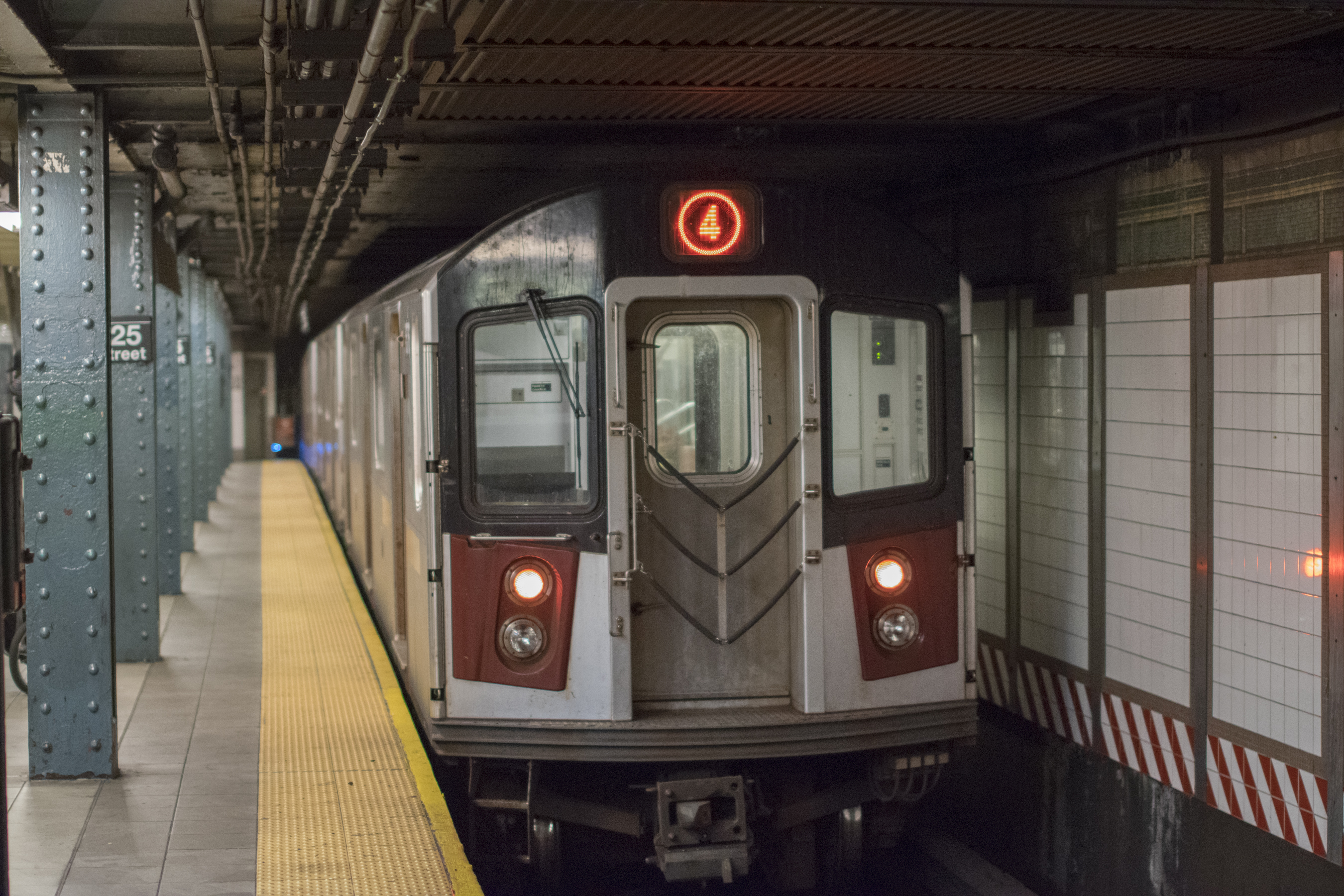
The New York City Subway is managed by the Metropolitan Transportation Authority (MTA), which is a state public-benefit corporation.

The Brooklyn Public Library and Queens Public Library are public library systems within their respective boroughs. The New York Public Library is a private, non-governmental library serving the Bronx, Manhattan, and Staten Island, that receives government funding. The New York City Housing Authority (NYCHA) provides public housing for low- and moderate-income residents. NYC Health + Hospitals (New York City Health and Hospitals Corporation, or HHC) operates public hospitals and clinics. The New York City Economic Development Corporation (NYCEDC) is the city's economic development corporation.

The Metropolitan Transportation Authority (MTA) manages the New York City Subway and MTA Regional Bus Operations through its arm the New York City Transit Authority. Despite this name, the NYCTA, like the rest of the MTA, was created by the New York State Legislature as a public-benefit corporation, which the legislature and governor of New York control. The MTA also operates the Staten Island Railway within Staten Island, as well as the Long Island Rail Road and Metro-North Railroad, both of which are commuter lines that have termini in the city but run largely in the suburban counties of New York State and Connecticut.

Other regional transportation is managed by the Port Authority of New York and New Jersey, including the bridges and tunnels between New York City and New Jersey, and all airports and seaports within the city. The Port Authority is an interstate compact operating agency jointly controlled by the Governor of New Jersey and Governor of New York.

=== Political parties ===
State Election Law defines the structure of political parties. It requires each party to have a state committee and allows them to organize county committees. The county committees are composed of at least two members elected from each election district (containing a maximum of 950–1150 registered voters). The law also allows the election of assembly district leaders. The political parties' county executive committees typically select candidates for local offices, to be ratified by the full county committees. Many small parties do not have county committees and designate candidates at the state level. The political parties' judicial nominating conventions select candidate New York Supreme Court justices. Candidates for the citywide offices of mayor, comptroller and public advocate are designated jointly by the five county executive committees of each party. In most cases, insurgents who are party members can challenge party-designated candidates by petitioning for a primary election.

== Heraldry ==

The seal of New York City, adopted in an earlier form in 1686, bears the legend SIGILLVM CIVITATIS NOVI EBORACI, which means simply "The Seal of the City of New York". Eboracum was the Roman name for York, the titular seat of James II as Duke of York. The two supporters represent the unity between Native Americans and colonists, the four windmill sails recall the city's Dutch history as New Amsterdam, and the beavers and flour barrels the city's earliest trade goods (see History of New York City). The crest over the seal is the American eagle, added after the American Revolution. "1625", the date at the bottom, was chosen to emphasize the city's Dutch roots but has been characterized as "arbitrary" and "simply wrong" by notable city historians (New Amsterdam was actually settled in 1624).

The flag of New York City was adopted in 1915. Its blue, white, and orange bands represent the colors of the Dutch flag that flew over the city, then New Amsterdam, between the 1620s and 1660s. Located in the center is a blue print of the official Seal of New York City minus its Latin motto.

There are two official variants of the New York City flag. The Mayor's Office version adds an arc of five five-pointed stars (representing each of the five boroughs) in blue above the seal, and the Councilmanic version adds the word "COUNCIL" in blue below the seal.

== See also ==
- Government and politics in Brooklyn
- Government of New York (state)
- List of New York City borough halls and municipal buildings
- Politics of New York City
- 2021 New York City borough president elections
- 2025 New York City borough president elections
- List of borough presidents of New York City
- Community boards of New York City
  - Community boards of Manhattan
  - Community boards of the Bronx
  - Community boards of Brooklyn
  - Community boards of Queens
  - Community boards of Staten Island
