= Legislative Bill Drafting Commission =

Commission overview
- Jurisdiction: New York
- Headquarters: 55 Elk Street, Albany, NY
- Commission executives: Daniel F. Salvin, commissioner; James E. Long, commissioner
- Key document: Legislative Law

The New York Legislative Bill Drafting Commission (LBDC) aids the New York State Legislature in drafting legislation; advises as to the constitutionality, consistency or effect of proposed legislation; conducts research; and publishes and maintains the documents of the Legislature. It is composed of two commissioners.

The LBDC maintains the Legislative Retrieval System (LRS) containing the full record of Legislature activity, for which it charges $2500 per session for access. The LRS version of the Consolidated Laws is published under statutory authority and is available online but is not certified pursuant to Public Officers Law § 70-b. The LBDC also publishes the Laws of New York.

The LBDC is composed of two commissioners, the Commissioner for Administration and the Commissioner for Operations, each appointed jointly by the Temporary President of the Senate and the Speaker of the Assembly.

== See also ==
- Congressional Research Service of the Library of Congress
- Office of the Law Revision Counsel of the US House of Representatives
- Office of the Federal Register of the National Archives and Records Administration
- Parliamentary Examiners in the United Kingdom
- Wisconsin Legislative Reference Bureau
