= National Defense Authorization Act for Fiscal Year 2018 =

United States Law

- Long title: An Act To authorize appropriations for fiscal year 2018 for military activities of the Department of Defense, for military construction, and for defense activities of the Department of Energy, to prescribe military personnel strengths for such fiscal year, and for other purposes.
- Acronyms (colloquial): NDAA 2018
- Enacted by: the 115th United States Congress
- Effective: 12 December 2017

Citations
- Public law: Pub. L. 115–91 (text) (PDF)
- Statutes at Large: 131 Stat. 1332

Codification
- Acts amended: List of acts: Public Health Service Act; The Merchant Ship Sales Act of 1946; Department of Defense Authorization Act, 1985; National Defense Authorization Act, Fiscal Year 1989; Oil Pollution Act of 1990; National Defense Authorization Act for Fiscal Years 1990; Armed Forces Retirement Home Act of 1991; National Defense Authorization Act for Fiscal Year 1991; National Defense Authorization Act for Fiscal Year 1992; National Defense Authorization Act for Fiscal Year 1993; National Defense Authorization Act for Fiscal Year 1994; National Defense Authorization Act for Fiscal Year 1995; 1997 Emergency Supplemental Appropriations Act for Recovery from Natural Disasters, and for Overseas Peacekeeping Efforts, Including Those in Bosnia; National Defense Authorization Act for Fiscal Year 2000; Energy Employees Occupational Illness Compensation Program Act of 2000; National Defense Authorization Act for Fiscal Year 2002; National Science Foundation Authorization Act of 2002; Veterans Benefits Act of 2003; Military Construction Authorization Act for Fiscal Year 2004; National Defense Authorization Act for Fiscal Year 2004; Consolidated Appropriations Act, 2005; Ronald W. Reagan National Defense Authorization Act for Fiscal Year 2005; Emergency Supplemental Appropriations Act for Defense, the Global War on Terror, and Hurricane Recovery, 2006; John Warner National Defense Authorization Act for Fiscal Year 2007; National Defense Authorization Act for Fiscal Year 2008; Duncan Hunter National Defense Authorization Act for Fiscal Year 2009; Afghan Allies Protection Act of 2009; National Defense Authorization Act for Fiscal Year 2010; Carl Levin and Howard P. “Buck” McKeon National Defense Authorization Act for Fiscal Year 2015; Ike Skelton National Defense Authorization Act for Fiscal Year 2011; Honoring America's Veterans and Caring for Camp Lejeune Families Act of 2012; National Defense Authorization Act for Fiscal Year 2012; National Defense Authorization Act for Fiscal Year 2013; Cybersecurity Enhancement Act of 2014; National Defense Authorization Act for Fiscal Year 2014; National Defense Authorization Act for Fiscal Year 2015; National Defense Authorization Act for Fiscal Year 2016; Military Justice Act of 2016; Military Construction Authorization Act for Fiscal Year 2016; Military Construction Authorization Act for Fiscal Year 2017; National Defense Authorization Act for Fiscal Year 2017; Indian Health Care Improvement Act; Controlled Substances Import and Export Act; The Department of Defense Cooperative Threat Reduction Act; Small Business Act; Atomic Energy Defense Act; National Nuclear Security Administration Act; Federal Water Pollution Control Act
- Titles amended: 5, 10, 14, 15, 22, 24, 31, 33, 36, 37, 38, 40, 41, 42, 46, 48, 49, 50

Legislative history
- Introduced in the House as H.R. 2810 by Mac Thornberry (R-TX) on 7 June 2017; Committee consideration by United States House Committee on Armed Services, United States Senate Committee on Armed Services; Passed the House on 14 July 2017 (344–81); Passed the Senate on 18 September 2017 (89–8); Signed into law by President Donald Trump on 12 December 2017

The National Defense Authorization Act for Fiscal Year 2018 (H.R. 2810; NDAA 2018, Pub.L. 115–91) is a United States federal law which specifies the budget, expenditures and policies of the Department of Defense (DOD) for Fiscal Year 2018. Analogous NDAAs have been passed in previous and subsequent years.

== Background ==
The Trump Administration released its fiscal year 2018 budget request on 23 May 2017, requesting $677.1 billion for the federal government's national defense-related activities. $667.6 billion of that amount was for discretionary funding to be provided by an annual appropriations bill. For fiscal year 2018, the cap set by the Budget Control Act of 2011 on discretionary defense spending was $549 billion. The Trump Administration budget request exceeded this cap by $46 billion.

== Legislative history ==
=== House vote ===
H.R. 2810, the version of the NDAA 2018 which was reported by the House Armed Services Committee, was passed by the House of Representatives on 14 July 2017 in a 344–81 vote.

=== Senate vote ===
The Senate Armed Services Committee reported its version of the NDAA 2018 bill, S. 1519, on 10 July. The text of S. 1519 was substituted for the House-passed text of H.R. 2810, and Senate passed an amended version of H.R. 2810 on 18 September in an 89–8 vote.

=== Presidential signature ===
President Donald Trump signed the NDAA 2018 on 12 December 2017.

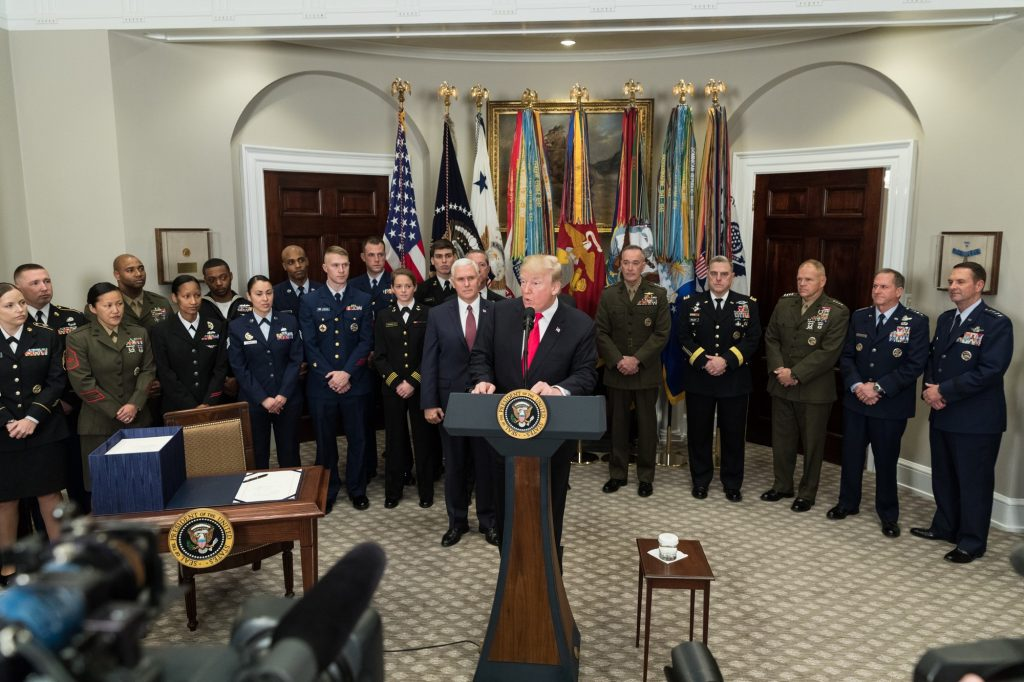
President Donald Trump delivering remarks prior to signing the NDAA 2018 alongside Vice President Mike Pence and senior military leaders

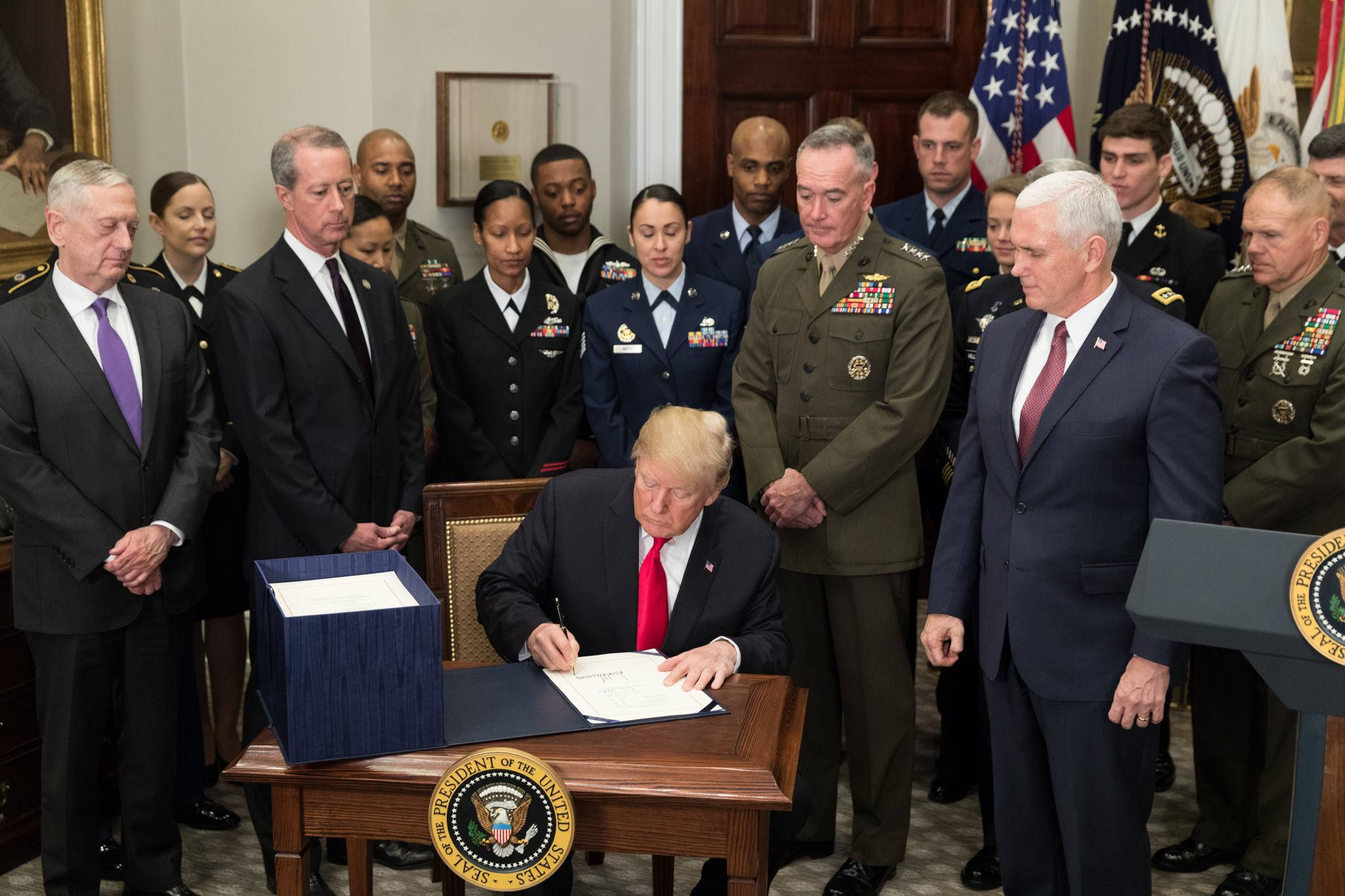
President Donald Trump signing the NDAA 2018

== Sections of the Act ==
=== Supply chain security ===
Section 807 relates to the need to enhance supply chain security in relation to defense supplies, and directs the Secretary of Defense to integrate supply chain risk management into acquisition decision making, and to co-ordinate with interagency, industrial and international partners as necessary to support a government-wide approach to supply chain risk.

=== Procurement of commercial items ===
Section 846 allows for a program of online purchasing for commercially available products, using online marketplaces. The Act refers to "commercial e-commerce portals ... that are widely used in the private sector", with commentators noting that the legislators had sites in mind such as "Amazon, Staples, and Grainger". Initial "proof of concept" contracts were awarded to Amazon Business, Fisher Scientific and Overstock Government in June 2020.

=== Foreign Spill Protection Act of 2017 ===
Florida congressmen Carlos Curbelo (R) and Patrick Murphy (D) proposed the Foreign Spill Protection Bill in 2015 to change the Oil Pollution Act (OPA) to ensure the costs of foreign oil spills in American waters are incurred by the responsible party. The bill was passed with no opposition in the House in April 2016 but did not pass in the Senate. Curbelo brought back the bill in 2017 with Florida U.S. Representative Darren Soto (D) as the chief cosponsor. The Foreign Spill Protection Act was subsequently passed as section 3508 of the NDAA for fiscal year 2018.

=== Intermediate-Range Nuclear Forces (INF) Treaty Preservation Act of 2017 ===
The Intermediate-Range Nuclear Forces Treaty (INF) removes American and Russian ground-launched intermediate-range missiles. The NDAA 2018 includes a $25 million fund for developing a new road-mobile ground-launched cruise missile which would be prohibited by the INF Treaty. The Intermediate-Range Nuclear Forces (INF) Treaty Preservation Act of 2017 included within the NDAA 2018 explicitly calls for the establishment of an American missile program that violates the terms of the INF Treaty. Pentagon spokesman Thomas Crosson stated, "We are prepared to stop such research and development if Russia returns to verifiable compliance with the Treaty."

=== Saving Federal Dollars Through Better Use of Government Purchase and Travel Cards Act of 2017 ===
The NDAA included a bill for the Saving Federal Dollars Through Better Use of Government Purchase and Travel Cards Act, which was proposed by U.S. Senators Chuck Grassley (R-Iowa), Tom Carper (D-Delaware), and Claire McCaskill (D-Missouri) to crack down on waste, fraud, and abuse in the spending on travel and purchase cards by federal agencies.

=== Modernizing Government Technology Act ===
The 2018 NDAA included the Modernizing Government Technology Act (MGT Act), which would fund IT modernization projects in the federal government with $250 million each in fiscal 2018 and fiscal 2019. The money is to be held by GSA in a category called the Technology Modernization Fund. The MGT act requires agency CIOs to evaluate applications from within their agencies, and if funding is received to report on the projects every six months. The MGT had evolved from proposals by Reps. Will Hurd and Steny Hoyer who had combined efforts in September 2016.
