= Death on the High Seas Act =

US admiralty law, enacted 1920

- Long title: An Act relating to the maintenance of actions for death on the high seas and other navigable waters.
- Nicknames: Death on the High Seas Act 1920
- Enacted by: the 66th United States Congress
- Effective: March 30, 1920

Citations
- Public law: Pub. L. 66–165
- Statutes at Large: 41 Stat. 537

Codification
- Titles amended: 46 U.S.C.: Shipping
- U.S.C. sections created: 46 U.S.C. ch. 303 § 30301 et seq.

Legislative history
- Introduced in the Senate as S. 2085; Passed the Senate on October 20, 1919 (Passed); Passed the House on March 17, 1920 (201-75) with amendment; Senate agreed to House amendment on March 22, 1920 (Agreed); Signed into law by President Woodrow Wilson on March 30, 1920

Major amendments
- April 2000

The Death on the High Seas Act (DOHSA) (46 U.S.C. §§ 30301–30308) is a United States admiralty law enacted by the United States Congress in 1920. The Act (often referred to as DOHSA) functions as a wrongful death statute, providing a course of action for surviving family members when an individual dies as a result of a wrongful act or disaster in international waters. These individuals may make a civil claim for damages against the "person or vessel responsible" for the wrongful or negligent act that caused the death. DOHSA also applies to negligent acts causing death that occur after the initial accident, if the decedent was on the high seas at the time the negligence began. Though DOHSA is generally the exclusive remedy available for certain wrongful death claims under maritime law, surviving relatives may make concurrent claims under DOHSA and the Jones Act in some circumstances.

While DOHSA was originally intended to cover naval accidents and other incidents occurring on ships, the Act was amended in 2000 and to expand the amount of recovery available to victims' families after deaths resulting from certain commercial airline disasters. The statute was subsequently repealed and re-codified with minor changes to the statutory language in 2006.

== Background ==
=== Legislative history and purpose ===
Prior to DOHSA's enactment, advocates for the bill were concerned that no remedies were available for an individual who died on the high seas, which are outside of the reach of state and federal jurisdiction. The Bill received support from the judicial branch as well, with some individuals noting a need for a uniform law to apply to these types of maritime disputes. Several versions of DOHSA were introduced to Congress on three occasions between 1900 and 1915, but the Act failed to pass each time. After the Titanic sank in 1912, awareness of maritime deaths increased, and the Act finally passed in 1920. DOHSA is viewed as an exercise of Congressional implied powers to "revise and supplement the maritime law within the limits of the Constitution."

The Act originally only applied to deaths occurring on the high seas, "beyond 3 nautical miles from the shore of the United States." In 2000, Congress amended the Act to also apply to deaths arising out of commercial airline disasters over the high seas occurring more than 12-nautical miles outside of U.S. territorial waters. The Act does not apply to aviation incidents that occur within 12-nautical miles of the United States' territorial waters, incidents that occur on the Great Lakes, or incidents that occur on any waters within the territorial limits of the United States.

When the Act applies to a particular incident, it is the parties' exclusive remedy for wrongful death claims and it preempts any additional claims for wrongful death or pre-death pain and suffering under state law or general maritime law. The Act does not necessarily prevent the beneficiaries from making claims based on their own pain and suffering, if they personally witnessed the incident that caused the death.

=== Damages ===
Damages under DOHSA are generally limited to "fair compensation for the pecuniary loss sustained by the individuals for whose benefit the action is brought." In other words, damages under the Act are calculated based on "the pecuniary benefits that the beneficiaries might reasonably be expected to have derived from the decedent had his life not been terminated," or the amount of money that the deceased individual would have contributed to the surviving family members lives if they had not died. Damages should be calculated based on the deceased's age, earning potential, overall health, and the amount of contribution made to the surviving relatives' lives prior to death. Courts differ in their treatment of reimbursing funeral expenses as pecuniary losses under DOHSA, some courts allow recovery of funeral expenses while others do not. Relatives of decedents who were retired or unemployed at their time of death are generally not able to recover anything under the statute as recovery should be proportionate to the decedent's earning potential prior to death.

Non-economic damages, such as loss of consortium (usually granted to a spouse for the loss of romantic and/or sexual relations with the deceased spouse), were originally not recoverable under the Act. However, when Congress amended DOHSA in 2000, it expanded the available remedies for certain deaths resulting from commercial airline disasters, and surviving relatives of these decedents may now recover additional damages "for loss of care, comfort, and companionship."

Lawsuits under DOHSA may generally be brought by a decedent's surviving spouse, parent, child, or other dependent relative, or the personal representative of the decedent's estate if one of the surviving family members lacks standing (most commonly done when a suit is being brought on behalf of a minor child).

While DOHSA preempts state laws and other generally applicable maritime laws, survivors may make concurrent claims under both DOHSA and the Jones Act if both the decedent's employer and another third-party were at fault for the death.

== Subsequent litigation and amendments ==
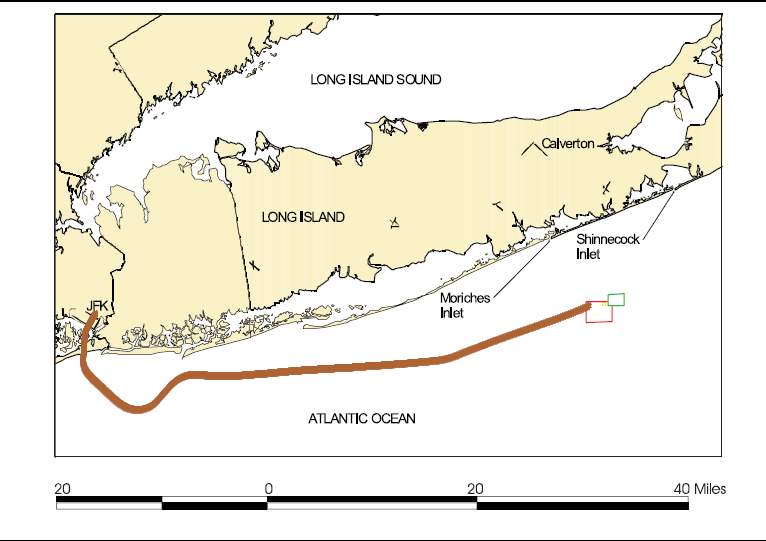
TWA 800 flight path

=== TWA Flight 800 crash ===
In 1996, TWA Flight 800 crashed shortly after taking off from John F. Kennedy International Airport, and all 230 passengers and crew members died. The crash generated extensive litigation, and the airline defendants argued that because the crash occurred more than 3 nautical miles from the United States' shores, DOHSA should apply and the plaintiffs' claims should be limited to pecuniary damages only. In other words, if DOHSA applied, the plaintiffs could not recover damages based on the decedent's pain and suffering, survivors' pain and suffering, loss of consortium, or other punitive damages. The Plaintiffs filed a federal lawsuit, In re Air Crash Off Long Island, in the Southern District of New York.

Plaintiffs argued that DOSHA should not apply to the crash because it did not occur on "the high seas," because it occurred only eight nautical miles from shore. The plaintiffs cited to a Proclamation by former President Ronald Reagan in which he extended the boundary of United States territorial waters to up to twelve miles from the shores. Notably, though, the Proclamation included a disclaimer stating that it was not intended to modify “existing Federal or State law or any jurisdiction, rights, legal interests, or obligations derived therefrom.”

The Southern District of New York ultimately agreed with the plaintiffs, noting that the Proclamation effectively "redefined" the high seas to extend to twelve nautical miles from shore. The defendants appealed, but the Second Circuit affirmed the lower court decision.

=== 2000 amendments ===
While TWA 800 litigation was pending, survivors' families were also busy lobbying for legislative relief. Seven days after the Second Circuit's decision, President Clinton signed a bill into law officially amending DOHSA, to apply retroactively to commercial airline crashes occurring on or after July 16, 1996 (the day before TWA 800 crashed), if the crash occurred more than 12 nautical miles from shore. This amendment is often referred to as the Commercial Aviation Exception.

Survivors making claims resulting from commercial aviation accidents may now recover damages for "loss of care, comfort, and companionship" in additional to all damages previously allowed under the statute. Restrictions on non-pecuniary losses still apply to deaths occurring on the high seas that are not the result of commercial aviation accidents.

At least one federal court has held that the phrase "commercial aviation accidents" encompasses more than just "accidents involving regularly scheduled, international flights." In Brown v. Eurocopter S.A., the court held that DOHSA applied to an on-demand air taxi helicopter flight, and the surviving relatives could recover non-pecuniary damages under § 30307.

The Commercial Aviation Exception greatly expanded the potential amount of recovery for surviving relatives of commercial aviation disasters, but Congress notably did not expand recovery for surviving relatives of maritime disasters, particularly in regard to incidents occurring on commercial cruise ships, or incidents occurring on non-commercial aircraft. This discrepancy generated widespread criticism of the statute and has prompted additional proposed legislation to provide the same coverage to surviving relatives of those individuals.

== Proposed legislation and criticism ==
Because the Commercial Aviation Exception did not expand the allowed amounts of recovery for survivors of non-commercial aircraft accidents or incidents on cruise ships, families of those decedents and other commenters have spoken out criticizing the cruise industry and the way DOHSA often shields large cruise lines from significant liability.

On April 16, 2016, an American couple, the Hammers, died after a fire started in their cabin on the first night of a 10-day Amazonian cruise aboard the La Estrella Amazonica operated by cruise line International Expeditions. After an investigation by the Peruvian Navy, the Hammers' daughters learned that their parents may have survived the fire if the ship's crew had been properly instructed on fire safety and inspection procedures, since the fire alarm never went off and the couple's cabin contained a faulty electrical power strip.

Because the Hammers were retired at the time of the incident (and no longer earning any wages), DOHSA would prevent basically all recovery by their adult daughters. Besides DOHSA's limited applicability, cruise ship ticket contracts are typically made up of clauses significantly limiting the cruise line's liability should something go wrong during the voyage, and passengers generally do not read these contracts or cannot understand the implications of the contracts on their ability to recover damages if an incident occurs.

In April 2022, Senator Deb Fischer introduced a piece of proposed legislation, to be cited as 'Hammers' Law'. The bill, if passed, would amend § 30307 of DOHSA (the Commercial Aviation Exception) to allow recovery of non-pecuniary damages for both commercial aviation accidents and cruise ship voyage accidents. The bill has not yet passed. See also https://www.govtrack.us/congress/bills/118/s1085/text

In October 2021, Representative Veronica Escobar introduced a proposed bill, to be cited as the 'Fairness for Fallen Sailors Act'. The bill would amend § 30302 of DOHSA to expand recovery for surviving family members of victims of maritime deaths to allow recovery for "the pre-death pain and suffering of the decedent, and non-pecuniary damages for the loss of care, comfort, and companionship of a family member of a decedent' after 'action is brought.'" The bill would also amend § 30307 of the Act to strike the word "commercial" from the statute and allow recovery of non-pecuniary damages in all aviation incidents occurring more than 12 nautical miles from U.S. shores.

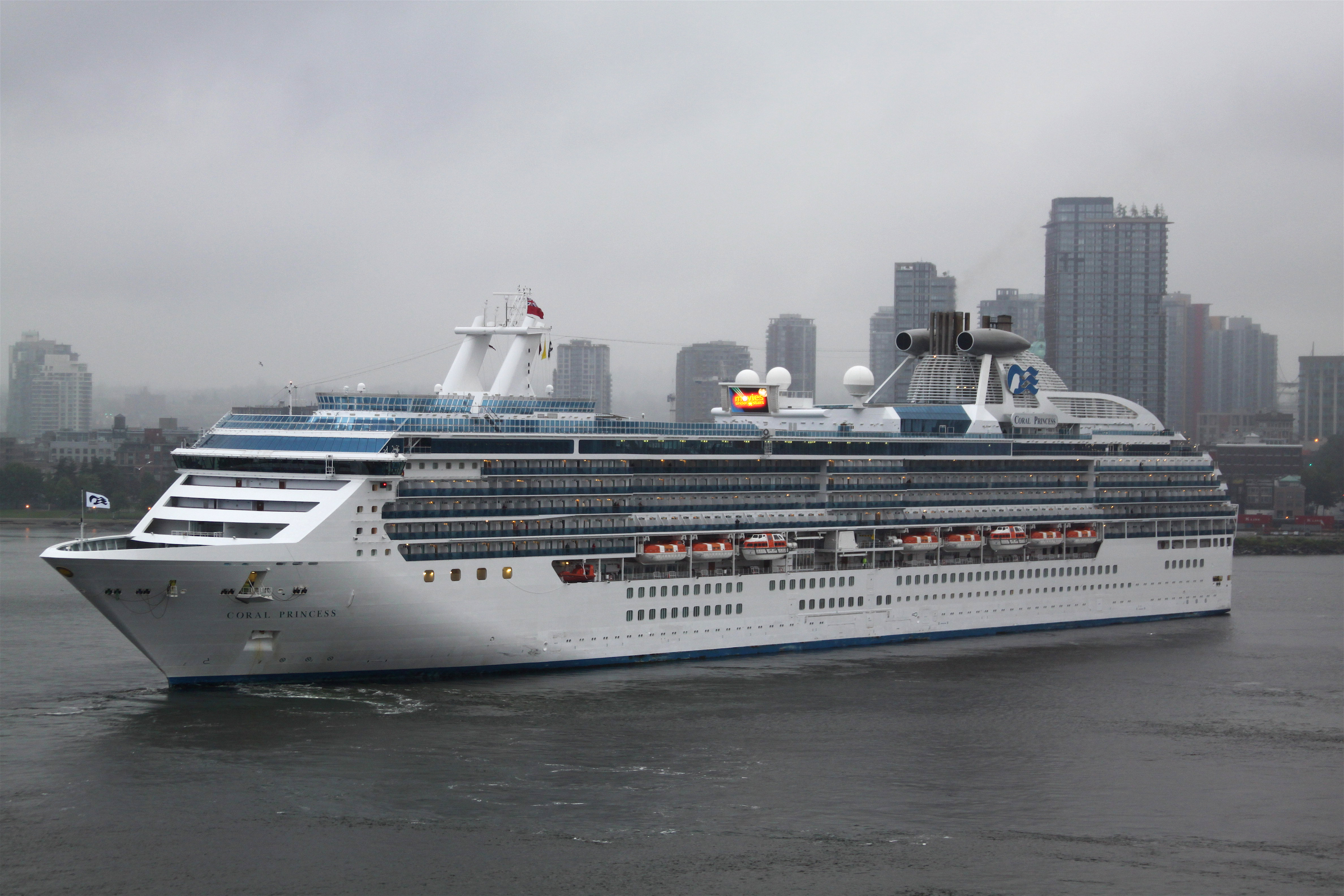
The Coral Princess in Vancouver in 2002

=== The COVID-19 pandemic ===
In addition to the already-proposed legislation to expand DOHSA to cover deaths on cruise ship voyages, the Act was challenged in court by individuals whose loved ones died as a result of contracting COVID-19 on cruise ships. After Wilson Maa died after contracting COVID-19 while on board the Coral Princess in March and April 2020, Toyling Maa sued Carnival Cruise Lines and Princess Cruise Lines making claims of negligence on behalf of herself and her deceased husband.

Maa claimed that the cruise line failed to disclose the severity of the virus, after two passengers died on board, and argued that DOHSA should not apply because her husband died after returning to shore. The district judge ultimately dismissed the lawsuit, noting that 9th Circuit precedent clearly shows that DOHSA applies to all accidents occurring on the high seas, regardless of where the death ultimately occurs. Several later cases involving similar facts (passengers passing away from COVID-19 after contracting the virus on a cruise ship) have reinforced the fact that DOHSA is the sole remedy for surviving relatives when the decedent contracts Covid-19 on the high seas and subsequently dies, regardless of their location at death.

== See also ==
- United States admiralty law
- Wrongful death claim
