= Merchant Marine Act of 1920 =

US federal law

- Other short titles: Jones Act
- Long title: An act to provide for the promotion and maintenance of the American merchant marine, to repeal certain emergency legislation, and provide for the disposition, regulation, and use of property acquired thereunder, and for other purposes.
- Enacted by: the 66th United States Congress
- Effective: June 5, 1920

Citations
- Public law: Pub. L. 66–261
- Statutes at Large: 41 Stat. 988

Codification
- Acts repealed: Emergency Shipping Act, 1917; Rate Emergency Act, 1918; Shipping Act, 1916, § 5, 7, 8;

Legislative history
- Introduced in the Senate by Wesley Jones (R–WA); Reported by the joint conference committee on June 4, 1920; agreed to by the House on June 4, 1920 (145–120) and by the Senate on June 4, 1920 (40–11); Signed into law by President Woodrow Wilson on June 5, 1920

The Merchant Marine Act of 1920 is a United States federal statute that provides for the promotion and maintenance of the American merchant marine. Among other purposes, the law regulates maritime commerce in U.S. waters and between U.S. ports. Section 27 of the Merchant Marine Act is known as the Jones Act and deals with cabotage (coastwise trade). It requires that all goods transported by water between U.S. ports be carried on ships that have been constructed in the United States, fly the U.S. flag, are owned by U.S. citizens, and are crewed by U.S. citizens or permanent residents. The act was introduced by U.S. Senator Wesley Jones. The law also defines certain seamen's rights.

The Merchant Marine Act of 1920 has been revised a number of times; the most recent revision in 2006 included recodification in the U.S. Code.

Many economists and other experts have argued for its repeal. Military and Department of Commerce officials have spoken in favor of the law on protectionist grounds. According to economists, the legislation reduces domestic trade via waterways, relative to other forms of trade, and increases consumer prices.

The Jones Act is not to be confused with the Death on the High Seas Act, another U.S. maritime law that does not apply to coastal and inland navigable waters, or with the Passenger Vessel Services Act of 1886, which regulates passenger vessels, including cruise ships.

== History ==
Laws similar to the Jones Act date to the early days of the United States. In the First Congress, on September 1, 1789, Congress enacted Chapter XI, "An Act for Registering and Clearing Vessels, Regulating the Coasting Trade, and for other purposes," which limited domestic trades to American ships meeting certain requirements. Such laws served the same purpose as and were loosely based on England's Navigation Acts, which were repealed in 1849.

The laws requiring that vessels transporting cargo domestically be U.S.-built, owned, and crewed were temporarily suspended during World War I. The Jones Act of 1920 reinstated those ideas into law and expanded restrictions regarding vessels used for cabotage in the United States.

=== 1920 law ===
The Merchant Marine Act of 1920 was introduced by Senator Wesley Jones, chairman of the Senate Commerce Committee. He said the act was "an earnest effort to lay the foundation of a policy that will build up and maintain an adequate American merchant marine in competition with the shipping of the world."

The intention of Congress was to develop a merchant marine for reasons of national defense and growth of foreign and domestic commerce, as stated in the preamble to the Merchant Marine Act of 1920 as originally enacted:

Be it enacted by the Senate and House of Representatives of the United States of America in Congress assembled, That it is necessary for the national defense and for the proper growth of its foreign and domestic commerce that the United States shall have a merchant marine of the best equipped and most suitable types of vessels sufficient to carry the greater portion of its commerce and serve as a naval or military auxiliary in time of war or national emergency, ultimately to be owned and operated privately by citizens of the United States; and it is hereby declared to be the policy of the United States to do whatever may be necessary to develop and encourage the maintenance of such a merchant marine, and, in so far as may not be inconsistent with the express provisions of this Act, the United States Shipping Board shall, in the disposition of vessels and shipping property as hereinafter provided, in the making of rules and regulations, and in the administration of the shipping laws keep always in view this purpose and object as the primary end to be attained.

— 41 Stat. 988 (1920)

Congress adopted the Merchant Marine Act in early June 1920 as 46 U.S.C. § 688, and it was signed into law on June 5, 1920, by U.S. President Woodrow Wilson.

=== 1936 law ===
The Merchant Marine Act of 1936 was a major update to the law. Its purpose was "to further the development and maintenance of an adequate and well-balanced American merchant marine, to promote the commerce of the United States, to aid in the national defense, to repeal certain former legislation, and for other purposes."

Specifically, it established the United States Maritime Commission and required a United States Merchant Marine that:

- can carry all domestic water-borne commerce,
- can carry a substantial portion of foreign commerce,
- can serve as a naval auxiliary in time of war or national emergency,
- is owned and operated under the U.S. flag by U.S. citizens "insofar as may be practicable,"
- is composed of the best-equipped, safest, and most suitable types of vessels,
- consists of vessels constructed in the United States, and
- consists of vessels crewed with a trained and efficient citizen personnel.

The Act restricted the number of aliens allowed to work on passenger ships, requiring that, by 1938, 90 percent of the crew members be U.S. citizens. Although about 4,000 Filipinos worked as merchant mariners on U.S. ships, most of them were discharged in 1937 as a result of the law. The Act also established federal subsidies for the construction and operation of merchant ships. Two years after it passed, the U.S. Merchant Marine Cadet Corps, the forerunner to the United States Merchant Marine Academy, was established.

U.S. Representative S. Otis Bland was known as the "father of the Merchant Marine Act of 1936."

=== Law revisions ===
The Merchant Marine Act of 1920 has been revised several times. In 1940, Congress expanded the Jones Act to cover towing vessels. In 1988, Congress specified that waterborne transport of valueless material, such as dredge spoil or municipal solid waste, requires the use of a Jones Act-qualified vessel.

The 2006 revision of the law included recodification in the U.S. Code.

== Cabotage ==
Cabotage is the transport of goods or passengers between two points in the same country, alongside coastal waters, by a vessel or an aircraft registered in another country. Originally a shipping term, cabotage now also covers aviation, railways, and road transport.

Most countries enact cabotage laws for reasons of protectionism or national security; 85% of the world's coastlines are under cabotage laws.

The cabotage provisions relating to the Jones Act restrict the carriage of goods or passengers between U.S. ports to U.S.-built and flagged vessels. They have been codified as portions of 46 U.S.C. Generally, the Jones Act prohibits any foreign-built, foreign-owned, or foreign-flagged vessel from engaging in coastwise trade within the United States.

A number of other statutes affect coastwise trade and should be consulted along with the Jones Act. These include the Passenger Vessel Services Act, 46 U.S.C. § 289, which restricts coastwise transportation of passengers, and 46 U.S.C. § 12112, which restricts the use of foreign vessels to commercially catch or transport fish in U.S. waters.

These provisions also require at least three fourths of the crew members to be U.S. citizens or permanent residents. The steel of foreign repair work on the hull and superstructure of a U.S.-flagged vessel is limited to ten percent by weight. The restriction largely prevents Jones Act ship owners from refurbishing their ships at overseas shipyards.

== Seamen's rights ==
Congress adopted the Merchant Marine Act in early June 1920, formerly 46 U.S.C. § 688 and codified on October 6, 2006, as 46 U.S.C. § 30104. The act formalized seamen's rights:

From the very beginning of American civilization, courts have protected seamen whom the courts have described as "unprotected and in need of counsel; because they are thoughtless and require indulgence; because they are credulous and complying; and are easily overreached. They are emphatically the wards of admiralty."

The Jones Act allows injured sailors to make claims and obtain damages from their employers for the negligence of the ship owner, including many acts of the captain or fellow crew members. It operates simply by applying to sailors similar legislation already in place that allowed for recoveries by railroad workers. Its operative provision is found at 46 U.S.C. § 30104, which provides:

Any sailor who shall suffer personal injury in the course of his employment may, at his election, maintain an action for damages at law, with the right to trial by jury, and in such action all statutes of the United States modifying or extending the common-law right or remedy in cases of personal injury to railway employees shall apply....

The law allows U.S. seamen to bring actions against ship owners based on claims of unseaworthiness or negligence, rights that are not afforded by common international maritime law.

The U.S. Supreme Court, in Chandris, Inc., v. Latsis, 515 U.S. 347, 115 S.Ct. 2172 (1995), set a benchmark for determining the status of any employee as a Jones Act seaman. Workers who spend less than 30 percent of their time in the service of a vessel on navigable waters are presumed not to be seamen under the act. The Court ruled that any worker who spends more than 30 percent of their time in the service of a vessel on navigable waters qualifies as a seaman under the act. Only maritime workers who qualify as a seaman may sue for damages under the act.

An action under the Jones Act may be brought in either a federal court or a state court. The right to bring an action in state court is preserved by the "savings to suitors" clause, 28 U.S.C. § 1333. The seaman-plaintiff is entitled to a jury trial, a right that is not afforded in maritime law unless a statute authorizes it.

Under the Jones Act, maritime law has a statute of limitations of three years and so seamen have three years to sue from the time that the injury occurred. If injured seamen do not sue within that period, their claim may be dismissed as time-barred.

== Effects ==
The Jones Act prevents foreign-flagged ships from carrying cargo between the contiguous U.S. and certain noncontiguous parts of the U.S. such as Puerto Rico, Hawaii, Alaska, and Guam. Foreign ships inbound with goods may not stop at any of these four locations, offload goods, load contiguous-bound goods, and continue to U.S. contiguous ports, but ships may offload cargo and proceed to the contiguous U.S. without picking up any additional cargo intended for delivery to another U.S. location.

=== Puerto Rico ===
In June 2012, the Federal Reserve Bank of New York indicated that the Jones Act may hinder economic development in Puerto Rico, but a Government Accountability Office report found the effect of repealing or loosening is uncertain, with possible tradeoffs.

In March 2013, the Government Accountability Office (GAO) released a study of the effect of the Jones Act on Puerto Rico. It noted, "Freight rates are set based on a host of supply and demand factors in the market, some of which are affected directly or indirectly by Jones Act requirements." The report further concluded that "because so many other factors besides the Jones Act affect rates, it is difficult to isolate the exact extent to which freight rates between the United States and Puerto Rico are affected by the Jones Act."

The report also addressed what would happen "under a full exemption from the Act, the rules and requirements that would apply to all carriers would need to be determined." The report continued, "While proponents of this change expect increased competition and greater availability of vessels to suit shippers' needs, it is also possible that the reliability and other beneficial aspects of the current service could be affected." The report concluded, "GAO's report confirmed that previous estimates of the so-called 'cost' of the Jones Act are not verifiable and cannot be proven."

In February 2025, Governor of Puerto Rico Jennifer Gonzalez-Colón announced a request by the government of Puerto Rico for a permanent exemption from air cabotage laws in Puerto Rico.

=== U.S. shipbuilding ===
Because the Jones Act requires all transport between U.S. ports to be carried on U.S.-built ships, its proponents claim that it supports the domestic U.S. shipbuilding industry. Shipyards that build Jones Act vessels are needed in order to build smaller but important government vessels such as auxiliary ships, cutters, and research vessels. Jones Act requirements create additional work for U.S. shipyards between government orders.

Proponents say that by keeping the industrial base working, the Jones Act allows the U.S. Navy and Marine Corps to spin up shipbuilding without relying on other nations. In a 2020 study on the maritime industry, the Center for Strategic and Budgetary Assessments, a defense think tank, warned that without the Jones Act, the shipbuilding industry would face dire impacts up to and including the inability of the government to purchase any auxiliary ships domestically.

Critics of the act describe it as protectionist and harming the overall economy for the sake of benefiting narrow interests. A 2014 report by The Heritage Foundation argues that the Jones Act is an ineffective way to promote U.S. shipbuilding, claiming it drives up shipping costs, increases energy costs, stifles competition, and hampers innovation in the U.S. shipping industry. A 2019 Congressional Research Service report stated that U.S. shipbuilding has declined in competitiveness since the law passed.

The Organization for Economic Cooperation and Development (OECD) estimated in 2019 that repealing the Jones Act would boost shipbuilding output by more than $500 million (~$620 million in 2025).

=== National security ===
One main impetus for the law was that during World War I, belligerent countries withdrew their merchant fleets from commercial service to aid the war effort, which left the U.S. without enough vessels to conduct normal trade, which impacted the economy. Later, when the U.S. joined the war, there were not enough vessels to transport war supplies, materials, and soldiers to Europe, which resulted in the creation of the United States Shipping Board.

The U.S. engaged in a massive shipbuilding effort, including building concrete ships, to make up for the lack of U.S. tonnage. The Jones Act was passed to prevent the U.S. from having insufficient maritime and shipbuilding capacity in future wars.

=== Homeland Security ===
The Jones Act includes dredging and salvage operations. Because it creates a domestic dredging and salvage industry in the U.S., it prevents the U.S. from depending on foreign companies to dredge naval facilities, which could create opportunities for sabotage or the depositing of underwater surveillance equipment.

Additionally, the requirement for ships in the domestic fleet to be crewed by U.S. citizens or permanent residents reduces the likelihood that foreign ships and mariners will illegally gain access to America's inland waterways and associated infrastructure. A 2011 Government Accountability Office (GAO) study found there are about 5 million maritime crew entries into the U.S. each year and that "the overwhelming majority of seafarers entering U.S. ports are aliens."

The study showed that 80% of those seafarer aliens work on passenger ships covered by the Passenger Vessel Services Act of 1886, rather than the Jones Act. The GAO stated that while there is no known example of foreign seafarer involvement in terrorist attacks or definitive evidence of extremists infiltrating the U.S. on seafarer visas, "the Department of Homeland Security (DHS) considers the illegal entry of an alien through a U.S. seaport by exploitation of maritime industry practices to be a key concern."

=== Importation of liquefied natural gas from Russia ===
Because of the lack of liquefied natural gas tankers complying with the Jones Act, the Northeastern United States imported liquefied natural gas from Russia to avoid shortages in 2018.

=== Restrictions on offshore wind farms ===
The Jones Act has been used by opponents of offshore wind farms to prevent foreign vessels from constructing and maintaining wind farms near the American coast. As of 2024, there were no active Jones Act-compliant wind turbine installation vessels and only one under construction, which increases costs and construction times for offshore wind projects that must use compliant barges to transfer parts to installation ships. A shortage of such vessels helped to cancel the Ocean Wind projects.

== Support ==
Supporters of the Jones Act maintain that the act is of strategic economic and wartime interest to the United States. They say that the act protects the nation's sealift capability and its ability to produce commercial ships. In addition, the act is seen as a vital factor in maintaining a viable workforce of trained merchant mariners for commerce and national emergencies. Supporters argue that allowing foreign-flagged ships to engage in commerce in domestic American sea lanes would undermine U.S. wage, tax, safety, and environmental standards.

According to the Lexington Institute, the Jones Act is vital to national security and plays a role in safeguarding America's borders. The Lexington Institute stated in a 2016 study that the Jones Act plays a role in strengthening U.S. border security and helping to prevent international terrorism.

== Criticism ==
=== Protectionism ===
Critics claim the Jones Act is protectionist and point to a 2002 report by the U.S. International Trade Commission that estimated the savings for the U.S. economy that would result from repeal or amendment of the Jones Act. Critics contend that the Act results in higher costs for moving cargo between U.S. ports, particularly for Americans living in Hawaii, Alaska, Guam, and Puerto Rico. This includes more than doubling the shipping costs to Puerto Rico.

The Jones Act negatively impacts the ability of Puerto Rico to acquire energy and acquire disaster relief services. It is estimated that Puerto Rico's power authority pays as much as 30% more for energy due to the ban on foreign-flagged ships. The Jones Act's detrimental impact during disasters is evident as it has been waived during Hurricanes Katrina, Sandy, and Harvey among others to accelerate the delivery of needed supplies.

A 2019 OECD study estimated that the economic gains to the U.S. economy from repealing the Jones Act would range from $19 billion to $64 billion.

=== Failure to accomplish stated purpose ===
Another criticism of the Jones Act is that as of 2023, it has already failed in its stated purpose of protecting the American merchant marine: "The Jones Act fleet has dropped from around 250 ships in the 1980s to just 91 today. No use protecting something that's already dead."

The Jones Act lacks any mechanism to force shippers to use only Jones Act ships over all other modes of transport irrespective of price or to force other modes not to compete with Jones Act ships. As a result, the Jones Act fleet is used only where shippers have no choice, moving large quantities of cargo over the ocean between noncontiguous parts of the U.S., rather than for moving cargo along coastal routes in the contiguous U.S.

In other words, the coastwise trade, called short-sea shipping in Europe, is virtually nonexistent in the U.S., and most of the 130 million Americans who live near a coastline must put up with road and rail networks jammed with domestic cargo that would have, almost anywhere else in the world, been routed to short-sea shipping.

== Repeal and reform movement ==
Legislative efforts to repeal the Jones Act have been repeatedly introduced in Congress since 2010 when the Open America's Waters Act was championed by Senator John McCain, who co-sponsored S. 3525 before the 111th United States Congress, then by Utah Senator Mike Lee, without passing to become law.

In 2019, and again in 2021, Representative Ed Case (Hawaii) introduced three reform Acts: H.R. Bill 298, the Noncontiguous Shipping Competition Act; H.R.299, the Noncontiguous Shipping Reasonable Rate Act; and H.R.300, the Noncontiguous Shipping Relief Act, to Congress.

H.R. Bill 8996, the Jones Act Repeal Act, was introduced by U.S. Representative Justin Amash (Michigan) on December 17, 2020, during the 116th United States Congress. Open America's Waters Act to repeal restrictions on coastwise trade was again submitted, as S. Bill 1646 by Senator Lee on May 13 2021, during the 117th United States Congress.

Amid calls for repeal, advocacy for reform, rather than repeal, of the Act also emerged, notably by the Cato Institute, Niskanen Center, Mercatus Center, and Heritage Institute.

In 2025, the Connecticut House of Representatives passed a committee resolution calling for amendments to the Jones Act.

== Waivers ==
Requests for waivers of the Jones Act and its provisions are reviewed by the Department of Homeland Security on a case-by-case basis and can be granted based only by the interest of national defense. Historically, waivers have been granted only in cases of national emergencies or upon the request of the Secretary of Defense.

In the wake of Hurricane Katrina, Homeland Security Secretary Michael Chertoff temporarily waived the coastwise laws for foreign vessels carrying oil and natural gas from September 1 to 19, 2005.

In order to conduct an emergency shipment of gasoline from Dutch Harbor, Alaska, to Nome, Alaska, in January 2012, Secretary of Homeland Security Janet Napolitano granted a waiver to the Russian ice class marine tanker Renda.

The Secretary of Homeland Security issued a temporary conditional waiver of the Jones Act for the shipment of petroleum products, blending stocks and additives from Gulf Coast Petroleum Administration for Defense District (PADD 3) to the New England and Central Atlantic Petroleum Administration for Defense Districts (PADDs 1 a and 1 b, respectively) for 12 days, from November 2 to 13, 2012, following widespread fuel shortages caused by Hurricane Sandy.

On September 8, 2017, the Jones Act was simultaneously suspended for both Hurricane Harvey, which hit Texas fourteen days prior, and Hurricane Irma, which hit Florida on that day. In the same month, the Act was waived, after two days of debate, for Puerto Rico in the aftermath of Hurricane Maria.

Requests for waivers of certain provisions of the act are reviewed by the United States Maritime Administration (MARAD) on a case-by-case basis. Waivers have been granted for example, in cases of national emergencies or in cases of strategic interest. For example, in June 2006, declining oil production prompted MARAD to grant a waiver to operators of the 512-foot Chinese vessel Tai An Kou to tow an oil rig from the Gulf of Mexico to Alaska. The jackup rig would be under a two-year contract to drill in the Alaska's Cook Inlet Basin. The waiver to the Chinese vessel was said to be the first of its kind granted to an independent oil-and-gas company.

Pressure exerted by 21 agriculture groups, including the American Farm Bureau Federation, failed to secure a Jones Act waiver following Hurricane Katrina in the Gulf of Mexico. The groups contended that farmers would be adversely affected without additional shipping options to transport grains and oilseeds.

In March 2026, in the midst of the Iran war, the Trump administration confirmed its intentions to suspend the Jones Act for 60 days in an attempt to counter the rising prices of oil and other goods. On 25 April 2026, U.S. President Donald Trump extended the waiver by another 90 days.

== See also ==
- Flag of convenience
- Foreign Dredge Act of 1906
- Passenger Vessel Services Act of 1886, a similar law concerning passenger transportation between U.S. ports
- Seaman status in United States admiralty law
- Navigation Acts
