= Title 52 of the United States Code =

U.S. federal statutes on voting and elections

Title 52 of the United States Code (52 U.S.C.), entitled "Voting and Elections", is a codification of the "general and permanent" voting and election laws of the United States federal government. This consisted of the transfer of titles 2 and 42 into a single title, a change made effective in the code’s 2012 print edition and added to the digital version in 2014. It was adopted as a result of "editorial reclassification" efforts of the Office of the Law Revision Counsel of the United States House of Representatives and was not enacted as positive law. (Note: In this context, "positive law" means that a title has been enacted by Congress as a statute in itself, as opposed to a title being a synthesis of different statutory provisions without being a statute as title. Positive law titles are admissible in court, while non-positive titles are only admissible as prima facie evidence of the law in effect and in case of dispute the United States Statutes at Large govern.)

== Outline of title 52 ==
Title 52

=== Subtitle I — Voting Rights ===
Subtitle I

- Chapter 101 — Generally
- Chapter 103 — Enforcement of Voting Rights
- Chapter 105 — Supplemental Provisions
- Chapter 107 — Right to Vote at Age Eighteen

=== Subtitle II — Voting Assistance and Election Administration ===
Subtitle I

- Chapter 201 — Voting Accessibility for the Elderly and Handicapped
- Chapter 203 — Registration and Voting by Absent Uniformed Services Voters and Overseas Voters in Elections for Federal Office
- Chapter 205 — National Voter Registration
- Chapter 207 — Federal Election Records
- Chapter 209 — Election Administration Improvement

=== Subtitle III — Federal Campaign Finance ===
Subtitle III

- Chapter 301 — Federal Election Campaigns

== See also ==
- Emoluments Clause (disambiguation)
