= Parliamentary Examiners =

Government legal experts

The parliamentary examiners are a group of legal experts charged with deciding whether a bill placed before the Parliament of the United Kingdom is a public, private or hybrid bill.

== History ==
The examiners have existed since approximately 1315, when the position of clerk of the parliaments was established during the reign of Edward II. The clerk was nominated by the king to serve as a "special deputy" and tasked with reading out the titles of bills and the responses from Parliament. The clerk convened a group of legal experts, examiners, to assist him with these tasks.

The Clerk of the Parliaments Act 1824 defined the examiners’ duties for the first time in statute, and the act is still in force and binding on current examiners.

Each House normally appoints two officials as Examiners of Petitions for Private Bills. Each Examiner may act on behalf of either House.

== Role ==
The modern role of the examiners is generally to decide whether a bill is a public bill or a hybrid bill. Examples of hybrid bills have been those to construct the Channel Tunnel, construct the Dartford–Thurrock crossing (the Dartford Crossing), create the London Passenger Transport Board and to build Crossrail.

Examiners are renowned for their ability to establish the accuracy of facts and their motto is Quaere verum ('Seek the truth').

== Canada ==
In Canada, examiners only rule whether a bill public or private, as, according to Beauchesne's Rules and Forms of the House of Commons of Canada, "According to Canadian standing orders and practice, there are only two kinds of bills – public and private".

== See also ==
- Congressional Research Service, for the United States Congress
- Legislative Bill Drafting Commission, a similar office in New York (state)
- Wisconsin Legislative Reference Bureau, a similar office in Wisconsin
