= Title 34 of the United States Code =

U.S. federal statutes on law enforcement

Title 34 of the United States Code is a non-positive law title of the United States Code with the heading "Crime Control and Law Enforcement." Released on September 1, 2017, by the Office of the Law Revision Counsel of the United States House of Representatives, it contains "crime control and law enforcement programs or activities in which the Attorney General or the Department of Justice (or one of its components) have been given primary responsibility." Much of the law transferred to Title 34 were laws editorially classified to sections of Title 42 or set out as notes to Titles 42, 18, and 28.

== History ==
Prior to 1956, Title 34 outlined the role of the United States Navy in the United States Code. It was repealed on August 10, 1956, by an act of Congress when the laws within it were either eliminated or moved into the new revision of Title 10.

== Acts ==
The Omnibus Crime Control and Safe Streets Act of 1968, as amended, is partly codified to Chapter 101 of Title 34.

The Violent Crime Control and Law Enforcement Act is partially codified to Chapter 121 of Title 34; however, those portions that amended the Omnibus Crime Control and Safe Streets Act of 1968 are found in Chapter 101 of Title 34, while still other portions of the Act are in the other portions of the U.S. Code or uncodified. The Violence Against Women Act of 1994 (VAWA) was enacted as Title IV of the Violent Crime Control and Law Enforcement Act. Where VAWA amended the Omnibus Crime Control and Safe Streets Act of 1968, it can be found at Subchapter XIX of Chapter 101 of Title 34. Where VAWA did not amend an existing Act or amend a positive law title of the U.S. Code, it can generally be found in Subchapter III of Chapter 121 of Title 34.

The Juvenile Justice and Delinquency Prevention Act of 1974, as amended, is partly codified to Chapter 111 of Title 34.

Some provisions of the Matthew Shepard and James Byrd Jr. Hate Crimes Prevention Act are codified to Chapter 305 of Title 34.

== Subtitle I — Comprehensive Acts ==
- Chapter 101 — Justice System Improvement
- Chapter 111 — Juvenile Justice and Delinquency Prevention
- Chapter 121 — Violent Crime Control and Law Enforcement

== Subtitle II — Protection of Children and Other Persons ==
- Chapter 201 — Victim Rights, Compensation, and Assistance
- Chapter 203 — Victims of Child Abuse
- Chapter 205 — Amber Alert
- Chapter 207 — Combating Domestic Trafficking in Persons
- Chapter 209 — Child Protection and Safety
- Chapter 211 — Combating Child Exploitation
- Chapter 213 — Rape Survivor Child Custody
- Chapter 215 — Advanced Notification of Traveling Sex Offenders
- Chapter 217 — Elder Abuse Prevention and Prosecution
- Chapter 219 — Ashanti Alert Communications Network

== Subtitle III — Prevention of Particular Crimes ==
- Chapter 301 — Computer Crimes and Intellectual Property Crimes
- Chapter 303 — Prison Rape Elimination
- Chapter 305 — Hate Crimes

== Subtitle IV — Criminal Records and Information ==
- Chapter 401 — Child Abuse Crime Information and Background Checks
- Chapter 403 — Criminal Justice Identification, Information, and Communication
- Chapter 405 — Reporting of Unidentified and Missing Persons
- Chapter 407 — DNA Identification
- Chapter 409 — National Instant Criminal Background Check System
- Chapter 411 — Access to Criminal History and Identification Records
- Chapter 413 — Crime Reports and Statistics
- Chapter 415 — Resource Centers, Task Forces, Databases, and Programs

== Subtitle V — Law Enforcement and Criminal Justice Personnel ==
- Chapter 501 — Emergency Federal Law Enforcement Assistance
- Chapter 503 — Law Enforcement Congressional Badge of Bravery
- Chapter 505 — National Blue Alert
- Chapter 507 — Law Enforcement Suicide Data Collection
- Chapter 509 — Confidentiality Opportunities for Peer Support Counseling

== Subtitle VI — Other Crime Control and Law Enforcement Matters ==
- Chapter 601 — Prisons
- Chapter 603 — Improving the Quality of Representation in State Capital Cases
- Chapter 605 — Recidivism Prevention
- Chapter 607 — Project Safe Neighborhoods Block Grant Program
- Chapter 609 — Homicide Victims' Families' Rights
