= Consolidated Laws of New York =

United States state legal code

Consolidated Laws of the State of New York
- Title page of volume 1
- Published: 1909

The Consolidated Laws of the State of New York are the codification of the permanent laws of a general nature of New York enacted by the New York State Legislature.

It is composed of several chapters, or laws. New York uses a system called "continuous consolidation" whereby each session law clearly identifies the law and section of the Consolidated Laws affected by its passage. Unlike civil law codes, the Consolidated Laws are systematic but neither comprehensive nor preemptive, and reference to other laws and case law is often necessary. The Consolidated Laws were printed by New York only once in 1909–1910, but there are 3 comprehensive and certified updated commercial private versions. The Laws can be found online without their amendment history, source notes, or commentary.

There also exist unconsolidated laws, such as the various court acts and the Welfare Reform Act of 1997. Unconsolidated laws are uncodified, typically due to their local nature, but are otherwise legally binding. Session laws are published in the Laws of New York.

== Publication ==
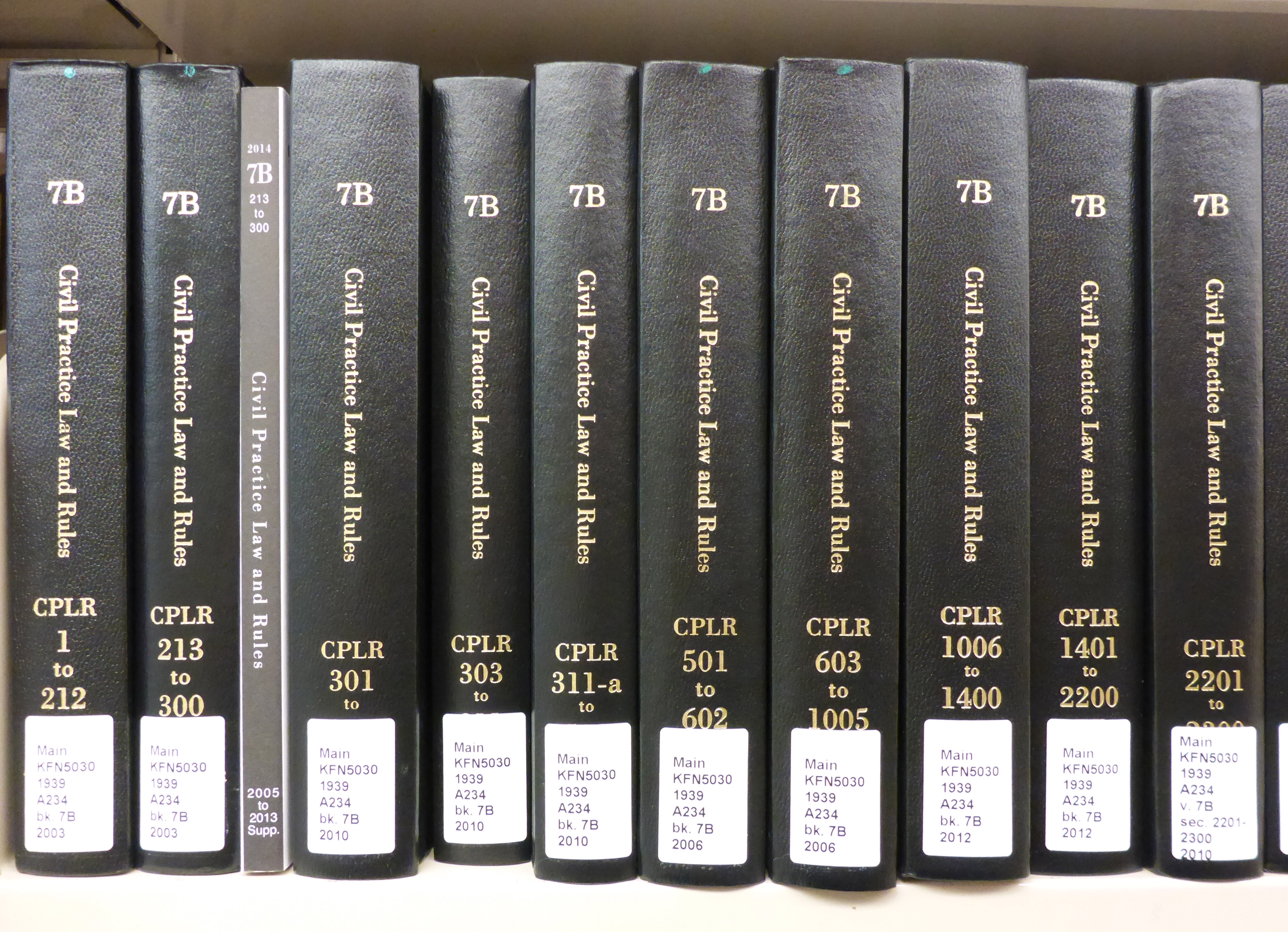
The McKinney's annotated version of the Consolidated Laws of New York (chapter 7B, Civil Practice Law and Rules)

The Consolidated Laws were printed by New York only once in 1909–1910. There are 3 comprehensive and unofficial but certified (pursuant to Public Officers Law § 70-b) printed versions of the Consolidated Laws: McKinney's Consolidated Laws of New York Annotated (McKinney's), New York Consolidated Laws Service (CLS), and Gould's Consolidated Laws of New York (Gould's). McKinney's and CLS are annotated, while Gould's is not. The Legislative Retrieval System (LRS) is published under statutory authority and is available online but is not certified. McKinney's is online and searchable on Westlaw, while CLS is online and searchable on LexisNexis. Commercial versions of the Consolidated Laws are also available from Loislaw, Blue360 Media, VersusLaw, Lawprobe, the National Law Library, and QuickLaw. Free unannotated versions are available from FindLaw, the New York State Legislature website, and the free public legislative website (which contains the same information as the LRS).

Unconsolidated laws are available in print from McKinney's, McKinney's Session Laws, and the CLS Unconsolidated laws. Online resources include LexisNexis, WestLaw, the LRS, and the New York Legislative Service, and selected laws can be found online on the New York State Legislature website and the free public legislative website.

The pocket part was introduced in 1916 by the West Publishing Company to update McKinney's.

== List of chapters ==
There are several chapters that compose the Consolidated Laws:

- Abandoned Property Law
- Agriculture and Markets Law
- Alcoholic Beverage Control Law
- Alternative County Government Law
- Arts and Cultural Affairs Law
- Banking Law
- Benevolent Orders Law
- Business Corporation Law
- Cannabis Law
- Canal Law
- Civil Practice Law and Rules
- Civil Rights Law
- Civil Service Law
- Cooperative Corporations Law
- Correction Law
- County Law
- Criminal Procedure Law
- Debtor and Creditor Law
- Domestic Relations Law
- Economic Development Law
- Education Law
- Elder Law
- Election Law
- Eminent Domain Procedure Law
- Employers' Liability Law
- Energy Law
- Environmental Conservation Law
- Estates, Powers and Trusts Law
- Executive Law
- Financial Services Law
- General Associations Law
- General Business Law
- General City Law
- General Construction Law
- General Municipal Law
- General Obligations Law
- Highway Law
- Indian Law
- Insurance Law
- Judiciary Law
- Labor Law
- Legislative Law
- Lien Law
- New York Limited Liability Company Law
- Local Finance Law
- Mental Hygiene Law
- Military Law
- Multiple Dwelling Law
- Multiple Residence Law
- Municipal Home Rule Law
- Navigation Law
- New York State Printing and Public Documents Law
- Not-for-Profit Corporation Law
- Parks, Recreation and Historic Preservation Law
- Partnership Law
- Penal Law
- Personal Property Law
- Private Housing Finance Law
- Public Authorities Law
- Public Buildings Law
- Public Health Law
- Public Housing Law
- Public Lands Law
- Public Officers Law
- Public Service Law (Public Service Commission Law)
- Racing, Pari-Mutuel Wagering and Breeding Law
- Railroad Law
- Rapid Transit Law
- Real Property Law
- Real Property Actions and Proceedings Law (RPAPL)
- Real Property Tax Law
- Religious Corporations Law
- Retirement and Social Security Law
- Rural Electric Cooperative Law
- Second Class Cities Law
- Social Services Law
- Soil and Water Conservation Districts Law
- State Law
- State Administrative Procedure Act
- State Finance Law
- State Technology Law
- Statute of Local Governments
- Tax Law
- Town Law
- Transportation Law
- Transportation Corporations Law
- Uniform Commercial Code
- Vehicle and Traffic Law
- Village Law
- Volunteer Ambulance Workers' Benefit Law
- Volunteer Firefighters' Benefit Law
- Workers' Compensation Law

Some specific articles are also notable:

- Human Rights Law
- Disability Benefits Law
- Article 7A of the Real Property Actions and Proceedings Law

== See also ==
- 50-a
- Laws of New York
- Administrative Code of New York City
- Law of New York
- United States Code
