= New York State Legislature =

Bicameral legislature of New York State

- Great Seal of the State of New York

Type
- Type: Bicameral
- Houses: Senate; Assembly

History
- Preceded by: General Assembly of New York

Leadership
- President of the Senate: Antonio Delgado (D) since May 25, 2022
- Temporary President of the Senate: Andrea Stewart-Cousins (D) since January 2, 2019
- Speaker of the Assembly: Carl Heastie (D) since February 3, 2015

Structure
- Seats: 213
- Political groups: Majority caucus: Democratic (41); Minority caucus: Republican (22)
- Political groups: Majority caucus: Democratic (102); Minority caucus: Republican (48)
- Salary: $142,000/year + per diem

Elections
- Last election: November 5, 2024
- Next election: November 3, 2026

Meeting place
- New York State Capitol; Albany

Website
- public.leginfo.state.ny.us

The New York State Legislature consists of the two houses that act as the state legislature of the U.S. state of New York: the New York State Senate and the New York State Assembly. The Constitution of New York does not designate an official term for the two houses together; it says only that the state's legislative power "shall be vested in the senate and assembly". Session laws passed by the Legislature are published in the official Laws of New York. Permanent New York laws of a general nature are codified in the Consolidated Laws of New York. As of 2025, the Democratic Party holds majorities in both houses of the New York State Legislature, which is the highest paid state legislature in the country.

Legislative elections are held in November of every even-numbered year. Both Assembly members and Senators serve two-year terms.

In order to be a member of either house, one must be a citizen of the United States, a resident of the state of New York for at least five years, 18 years or older, and a resident of the district for at least one year prior to election.

The Assembly consists of 150 members; they are each chosen from a single-member district. The New York Constitution allows the number of Senate seats to vary; as of 2014, the Senate had 63 seats.

== Leaders ==
The Assembly is headed by the speaker, while the Senate is headed by the president, a post held ex officio by the state lieutenant governor. the lieutenant governor, as president of the Senate, has only a tie-breaking "casting vote". More often, the Senate is presided over by the temporary president, or by a senator of the majority leader's choosing.

The assembly speaker and Senate majority leader control the assignment of committees and leadership positions, along with control of the agenda in their chambers. The two are considered powerful statewide leaders and along with the governor of New York control most of the agenda of state business in New York.

== Drafting and research ==
The Legislative Bill Drafting Commission (LBDC) aids in drafting legislation; advises as to the constitutionality, consistency or effect of proposed legislation; conducts research; and publishes and maintains the documents of the Legislature, such as the Laws of New York. The LBDC consists of two commissioners, the commissioner for administration and the commissioner for operations, each appointed jointly by the temporary president of the Senate and the speaker of the Assembly.

== Party control ==
In the 2018 elections, Democrats won control of the State Senate and increased their majority in the State Assembly. At the beginning of the 2019–2020 legislative session, the Senate Democratic Conference held 39 of the chamber's 63 seats and the Assembly Democratic Conference held 106 of the 150 seats in that chamber. The Senate Democratic Conference increased to 40 seats after Democratic senator Simcha Felder was re-accepted into the Conference.

Title page of volume 1 of the Consolidated Laws of New York

== Constitutional powers ==
The Legislature is empowered to make law, subject to the governor's power to veto a bill. However, the veto may be overridden by the Legislature if there is a two-thirds vote in favor of overriding in each House. Furthermore, it has the power to propose New York Constitution amendments by a majority vote, and then another majority vote following an election. If so proposed, the amendment becomes valid if agreed to by the voters at a referendum.

== History ==
The legislature originated in the revolutionary New York Provincial Congress, assembled by Patriot revolutionaires when the New York General Assembly would not send delegates to the Continental Congress.

The New York State Legislature has had several corruption scandals during its existence. These include the Black Horse Cavalry and Canal Ring.

In the 1840s, New York launched the first great wave of civil procedure reform in the United States by enacting the Field Code. The Code inspired the enactment of similar codes in 26 other states, and gave birth to the term "code pleading" for the system of civil procedure it created.

The first African-American elected to the legislature was Edward A. Johnson, a Republican, in 1917. The first women elected to the legislature were Republican Ida Sammis and Democrat Mary Lilly, both in 1919. The first African-American woman elected to the legislature was Bessie A. Buchanan in 1955.

Five assemblymen were expelled in 1920 for belonging to the Socialist Party.

In 2008, when the U.S. Supreme Court reluctantly affirmed the constitutionality of a statute enacted by the New York legislature, Justice John Paul Stevens wrote in a concurring opinion: "[A]s I recall my esteemed former colleague, Thurgood Marshall, remarking on numerous occasions: 'The Constitution does not prohibit legislatures from enacting stupid laws.'"

There is said to be a compact to which members of the New York Legislature unofficially adhere a code of silence regarding behavior such as illicit extramarital affairs or other embarrassing behavior.

Since January 1, 2025, lawmakers are subject to a limit on outside income set to $35,000. Republican members of both chambers were expected to be majorly impacted by the rule and sued to block it, but New York Supreme Court justice Alison Napolitano upheld the limit. It is unclear how the rule will be enforced, roughly 26 assemblymembers and 12 senators would likely have to resign or forfeit their outside income to remain in office.

== Legislative leadership ==
=== New York State Senate ===
- President of the Senate: Antonio Delgado
- Majority leader: Andrea Stewart-Cousins
- Minority leader: Rob Ortt

=== New York State Assembly ===
- Speaker of the Assembly: Carl Heastie
- Majority leader of the Assembly: Crystal Peoples-Stokes
- Minority leader of the Assembly: Edward P. Ra

== See also ==
- George G. Barnard
- Gibbons v. Ogden
- The Frawley committee
- The Hepburn Committee
- List of New York Legislature members expelled or censured
- List of New York State legislatures
- New York Provincial Congress
- New York State Assembly
- New York state public-benefit corporations
- New York State Senate
