= Looseleaf service =

Type of publication in legal research

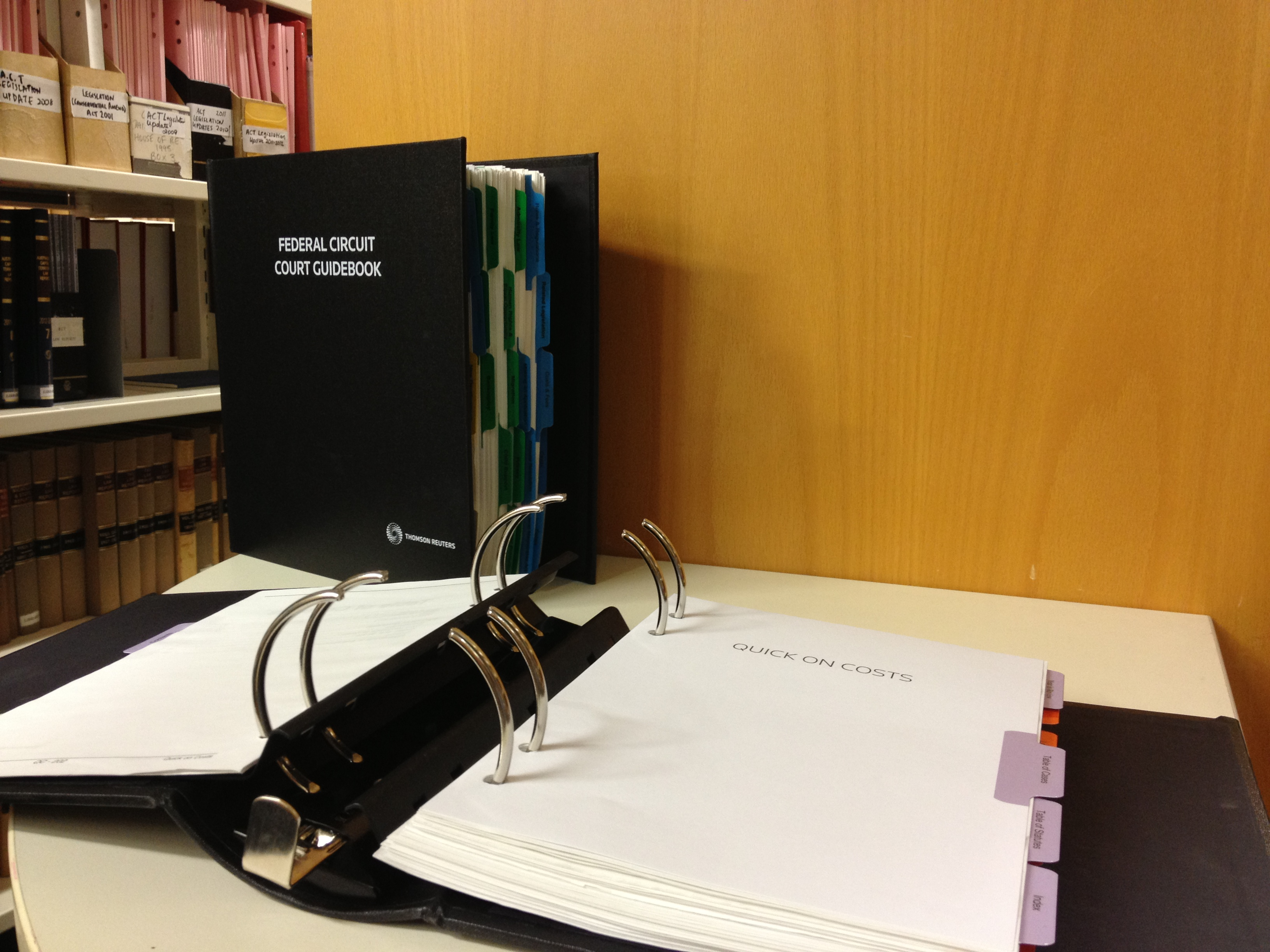
An Australian legal publication in looseleaf format.

A looseleaf service is a type of publication used in legal research which brings together both primary and secondary source materials on a specific field or topic in law. For this reason they are sometimes called "subject-matter services".

Looseleaf services are most commonly used for research in areas of law which change rapidly due to regulatory and administrative developments (such as tax law, environmental law, financial regulation, and labor law). Looseleaf services are typically contained in ring binders to keep them updated, because they are published fairly frequently (at minimum monthly, sometimes weekly or bi-weekly) in order to keep the information therein current.

Most law libraries have a subscription to several of these services, and most looseleaf services are now available electronically.

One major disadvantage of looseleaf services is that inserting newly updated pages into ring binders is a tedious and time-consuming exercise. Some publishers, such as the Rutter Group, have started to publish a new series of softcover volumes each year, in lieu of releasing updated pages for traditional looseleaf services.

== Types ==
=== Interfiled ===
In an interfiled looseleaf service, individual pages can be removed and replaced with more recent printings, eliminating the need for pocket parts or similar supplements. Most of the looseleaf services offered by Commerce Clearing House are of the interfiled type.

=== Newsletter-type ===
Newsletter-type looseleaf services are published as topical newsletters, which are then filed by law librarians under the appropriate topic headings for future reference. All these newsletters are intended to be permanently retained, which distinguishes them from the interfiled looseleaf services where obsolete pages are supposed to be discarded.

One of the best-known looseleaf services, United States Law Week, is of this type. Most of the looseleaf services published by Bureau of National Affairs are newsletter-style.

=== Hybrid ===
A hybrid looseleaf service includes characteristics of both types. It has some individual pages which can be replaced on an interfiled basis and some newsletters which are permanently retained. The Bureau of National Affairs publishes several hybrid looseleaf services.

== See also ==
- Pocket part – another common method of updating hard copy legal reference works
