= Laws of New York =

Laws of the State of New York
- Laws of New York of the first seven sessions of the state legislature, 1777–1801
- Publisher: Legislative Bill Drafting Commission
- ISSN: 0892-287X
- OCLC: 1644271

Laws of the State of New York are the session laws of the New York State Legislature published as an annual periodical, i.e., "chapter laws", bills that become law (bearing the governor's signature or just certifications of passage) which have been assigned a chapter number in the office of the legislative secretary to the governor, and printed in chronological order (by chapter number). Laws are usually cited in the form of "Chapter X of the Laws of YYYY" or "L. YYYY, c. X", where X is the chapter number and YYYY is the year.

The permanent laws of a general nature are codified in Consolidated Laws of New York using a system called "continuous consolidation" whereby each session law clearly identifies the law and section of the Consolidated Laws affected by its passage.

Laws of New York is published by the Legislative Bill Drafting Commission (LBDC). The New York Secretary of State is also responsible for publishing local laws as a supplement to Laws of New York, but they have not done so in recent years.

== See also ==
- Law of New York
- Consolidated Laws of New York
- United States Statutes at Large
