= New York Disability Benefits Law =

Law related to income replacement

The New York Disability Benefits Law (DBL) is article 9 of the Workers' Compensation Law (which is itself chapter 67 of the Consolidated Laws of New York) and creates a state disability insurance program designed to provide employees with some level of income replacement in case of disability caused off-the-job.

== Eligibility ==
To be required to have DBL coverage for its employees, a company must employ at least one person besides the proprietor within the state of New York. Full-time employees are eligible for coverage after four consecutive weeks of work, and part-time employees are eligible after their twenty-fifth day of employment.

Out of state employees cannot be covered under DBL policies, but the employer must have coverage if some employee's work primarily in New York. Only the New York employees will be covered.

== Cost and rates ==
DBL insurance groups are divided up into those covering fewer than 50 employees and those with 50 or more employees.

Employers with less than 50 employees are written at rates which are fixed for all groups, but that vary from one insurance carrier to another. Rates for employers with less than 50 employees are usually written as a dollar cost per employee, per month. These rates are further divided into separate male and female rates (which are higher than the male rates), to reflect the impact that pregnancy has on DBL claims. Many carriers offer a discounted rate for employers willing to pay all of their premium at the beginning of the year. If a carrier offers this option, the rate will be expressed as a dollar amount per male per year, and per female per year.

Carriers are prevented by the state Worker's compensation Board from raising or lowering their rates for groups with fewer than 50 lives. If a carrier's overall loss ratio (claims paid divided by premium) for their groups with less than 50 employees is too low, then the Worker's compensation Board may force the carrier to lower their rates for all of the groups with fewer than 50 covered lives.

Employers with 50 or more employees are not given fixed rates, but will request a quote from various insurance carriers through an insurance agent or broker. These rates can vary considerably and are based on the overall risk factors of the case. Carriers are permitted to review these groups and increase or decrease the rates based on the claims paid to the group and the premiums that the group pays to the carrier. These reviews are generally conducted quarterly, and the carriers will issue letters to the policyholders and their insurance brokers indicating the proposed changes in rate.

Rates for cases with more than 50 employees are usually given as a dollar amount per employee, per month (called a "per capita rate") with no division into male- and female-specific rates, or as a dollar amount per $100 of covered payroll. Other, less common rate structures include offering a dollar amount per male and per female (as with the groups with less than 50 employees), and offering a dollar amount per $10 of benefit.

== Benefits ==
As of 2006, DBL offers a benefit of 50% of weekly wages to a maximum of $170 per week of benefit beginning on the right day of disability. Benefits can extend to a maximum duration of 26 weeks.

It is possible for carriers to offer benefits that extend beyond the statutory DBL coverage known as "enhanced" or "enriched" DBL. This extended coverage usually takes the form of a higher maximum benefit, but can also include shorter waiting periods or a longer maximum duration. Carriers take these factors into account when underwriting DBL coverage, and so enriched DBL is often more costly than statutory DBL coverage.

== Premium payment ==
An employer is allowed, but not required, to collect contributions from its employees to offset the cost of providing benefits. An employee's contribution is computed at the rate of one-half of one percent of his/her wages, but no more than sixty cents a week (WCL §209).

== Paid Family Leave ==
In 2016, Governor Cuomo signed into law the Paid Family Leave policy. Starting January 1, 2018, the New York State Paid Family Leave Program provides New Yorkers job-protected, paid leave to bond with a new child, care for a loved one with a serious health condition or to help relieve family pressures when someone is called to active military service. Coverage for this benefit will generally be provided as a rider to the DBL insurance policy. For employers who are not required to have DBL coverage, PFL coverage may be obtained on a stand-alone basis. (NYCRR 380).

== See also ==
- United States state disability programs
- Law of New York
