= Miranda law =

Miranda law may refer to:

- Miranda warning rule, established in 1966 by the Miranda v. Arizona Supreme Court ruling
- A provision within the Omnibus Crime Control and Safe Streets Act of 1968
