= Rutter Group =

American legal website

- Available in: English
- Owner: Thomson Reuters
- Website: www.ruttergroup.com
- Commercial: Yes
- Launched: 1979

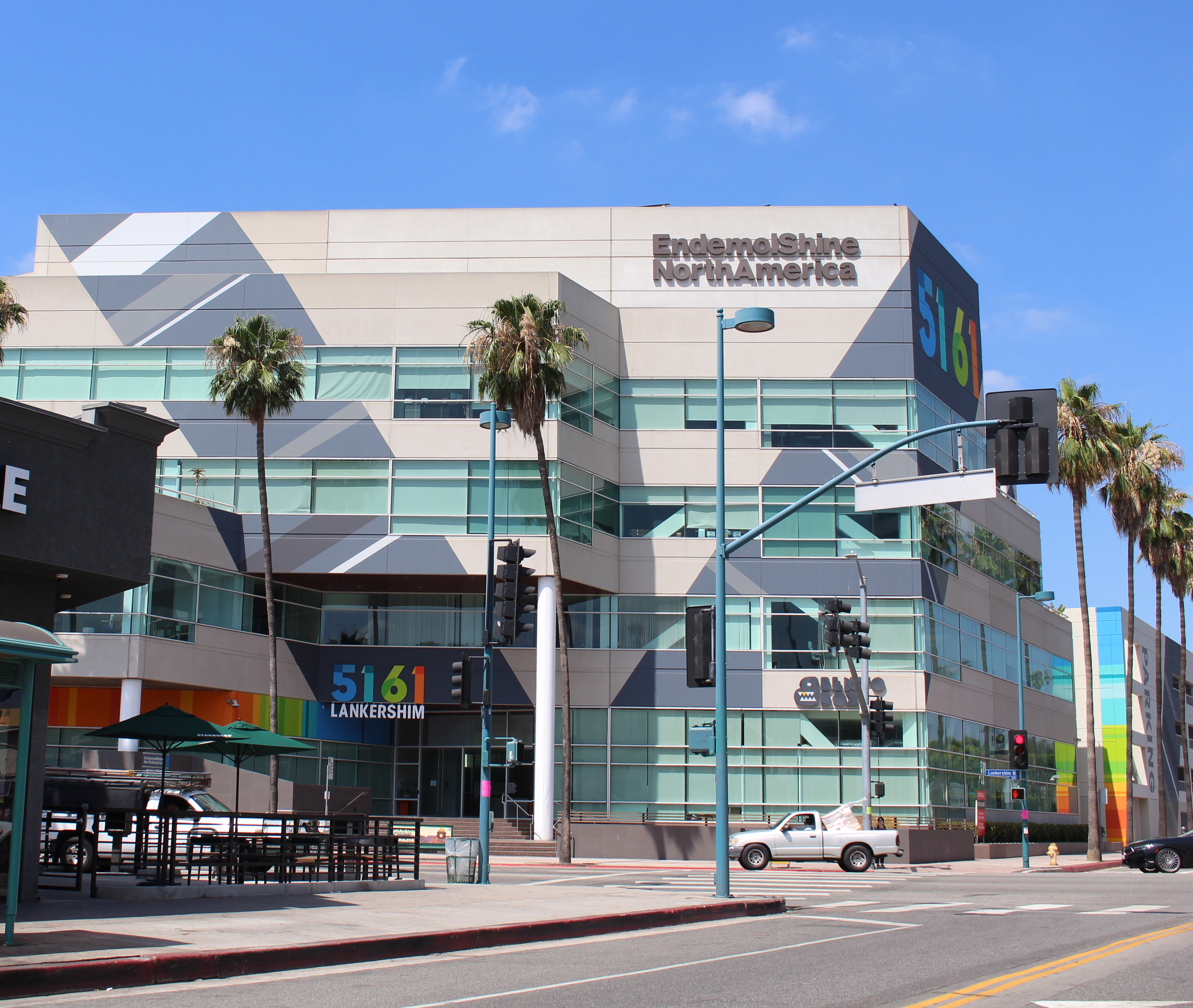
The Rutter Group's headquarters in North Hollywood, California (since 2025)

The Rutter Group, founded by William Rutter, with Linda A. Diamond, is a business of Thomson Reuters that publishes materials for lawyers and judges in the United States, with a particular focus on California. The Rutter Group is well known for its Rutter Group Practice Guides, which are written and edited by famous lawyers and judges. Courts have cited these treatises in almost 8,000 legal opinions, and they have been called the 'bible' for litigators.

Many of the cases that the treatises cite point back directly to the Rutter text as the original source of the legal principle applied. When this occurs, the Rutter treatises include the parenthetical "citing text" when listing the cases.

Because the publications are non-binding, courts may sometimes expressly decline to follow them. However, both California and federal courts have repeatedly identified Rutter treatises as "well-respected" interpretations of the law, which may be cited as "redoubtable" authority. The California Court of Appeal has treated the existence of conflicting Rutter Group authority as strong evidence that a legal question was unsettled and therefore not an appropriate basis for sanctioning an attorney.

The Rutter Group also sponsors panel discussions regarding recent changes in the law, and the judges it hires to participate in these events must disclose the compensation they receive because it could potentially be a conflict of interests.

== Rutter treatises ==
The Rutter Group now publishes more than twenty-five treatises, which are available both in print and through Westlaw. They are considered one of the primary reasons that many attorneys subscribe to Westlaw instead of its competitor, Lexis.

The print versions of the Rutter Group treatises were historically distributed as interfiled looseleaf services in ring binders, meaning that only the pages that had changed during a particular year were printed and sent. In 2020, Rutter Group began to send comprehensive updates. Subscribers were now instructed to replace all pages and to keep only the tabbed chapter dividers originally provided with their ring binders. In 2024, Rutter Group began to publish some treatises, such as the one on personal injury, as a series of softcover volumes.

Subjects include:

- Administrative law
- Alternative dispute resolution
- Bankruptcy
- Civil appeals and writs
- Civil procedure before trial
- Civil trials and evidence
- Corporations
- Employment litigation
- Enforcing judgments and debts
- Family law
- Federal civil procedure before trial
- Federal civil trials and evidence
- Federal employment litigation
- Federal Ninth Circuit civil appellate practice
- Insurance litigation
- Landlord–tenant
- Personal injury
- Privacy law
- Probate
- Professional responsibility
- Real property transactions
