= Title 24 of the United States Code =

U.S. federal statutes on hospitals

Title 24 of the United States Code outlines the role of hospitals and psychiatric hospitals in the United States Code.

- 24 U.S.C. ch. 1—Navy Hospitals, Army and Navy Hospital, and Hospital Relief for Seamen and Others
- 24 U.S.C. ch. 2—Soldiers and Airmens Home
- 24 U.S.C. ch. 3—National Home for Disabled Volunteer Soldiers
- 24 U.S.C. ch. 4—Saint Elizabeths Hospital
- 24 U.S.C. ch. 5—Columbia Institution for the Deaf
- 24 U.S.C. ch. 6—Freedmens Hospital
- 24 U.S.C. ch. 7—National Cemeteries
- 24 U.S.C. ch. 7A—Private and Commercial Cemeteries
- 24 U.S.C. ch. 8—Gorgas Hospital
- 24 U.S.C. ch. 9—Hospitalization of Mentally Ill Nationals Returned From Foreign Countries
- 24 U.S.C. ch. 10—Armed Forces Retirement Home
