= Pocket part =

Document on the back of a legal book to ensure the most current law is examined

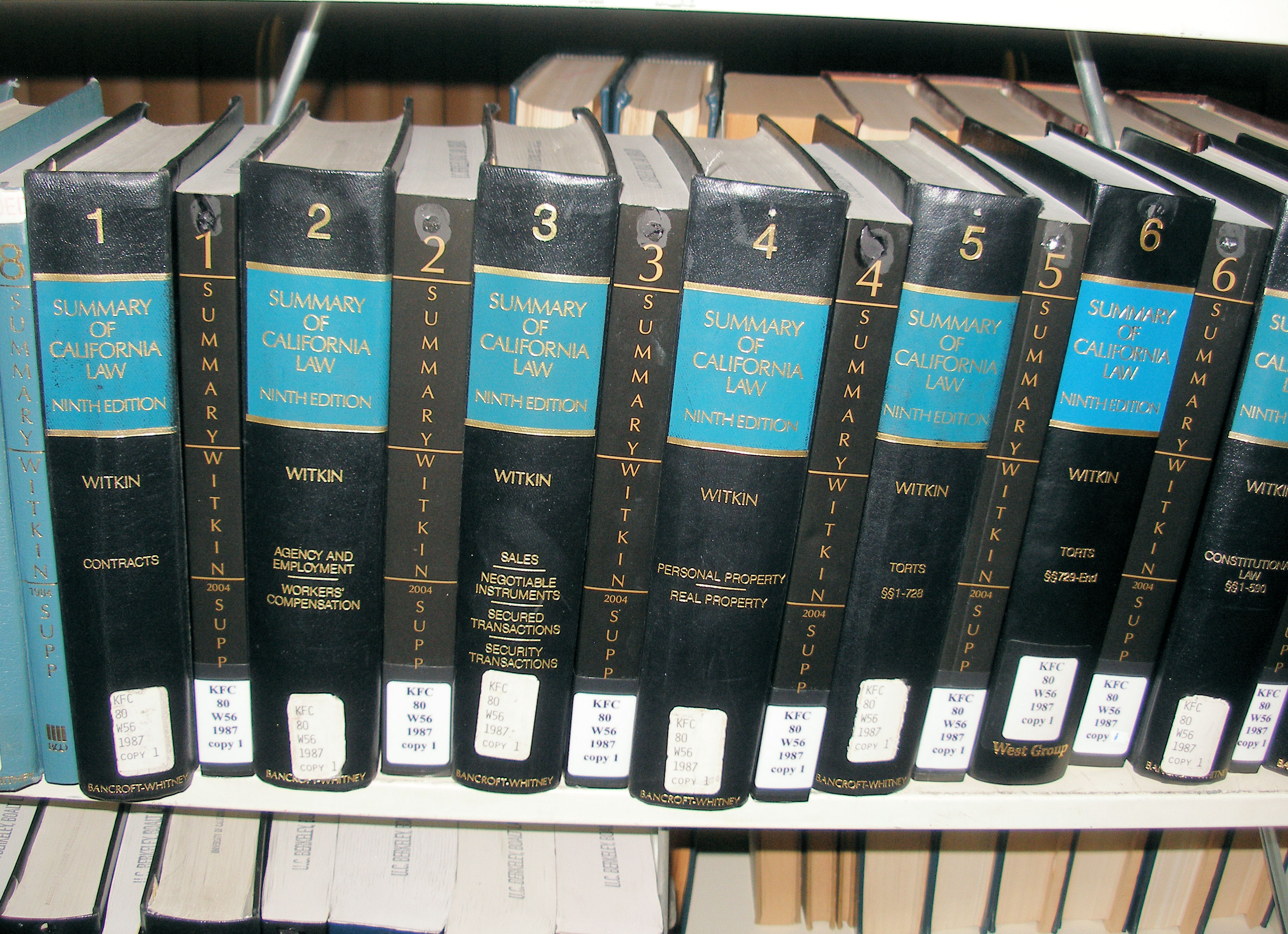
An example of how pocket parts may outgrow the pockets. The ninth edition of Witkin's Summary of California Law was superseded by the tenth edition in 2005 after the pocket parts grew too big.

A pocket part (formally titled as a supplement, abbr. supp.) is a special document located inside the back cover of certain hardcover legal reference books. Legal researchers consult it to ensure that the most current law is examined. The pocket part was first introduced in 1916 by the West Publishing Company to update McKinney's Consolidated Laws of New York.

== Process, design and purpose ==
A legal reference book designed to be used with a pocket part subscription comes in the form of a sturdy hardcover book with a large pocket built into the back cover. At regular intervals (usually annually), the publisher sends out a new pocket part, which is a saddle-stapled pamphlet printed on cheap newsprint. The part comes with a thick card stapled or glued to one cover, and that card is inserted into the pocket to hold the pocket part inside the book which it updates. A pocket part is cumulative, meaning that it includes all updates to the book between the original date of publication of the book and the date of publication of the pocket part. The task of regularly replacing pocket parts is one of the major chores of operating a law library.

At the time of publication, the book is organized into numbered sections which are usually several paragraphs in length. A reader of the book would first identify and consult the section in which they are interested, and then consult the pocket part to ensure that the section has not been amended, deleted, or superseded in the years since the hardcover book was printed. If the relevant section is omitted from the pocket part, then the reader may safely assume that the version of the section in the book itself is still current (at least as far as the author, editor and/or publisher are aware).

Since the law is always changing, a pocket part may eventually grow into a separate softcover booklet to be shelved next to its hardcover counterpart. Eventually, when a pocket part becomes nearly as big as its parent book (because most of the parent book's sections have changed since it was originally released), the publisher sends out a new hardcover volume with all the intervening changes incorporated, and directs subscribers to discard the old volume and pocket part. Then the process starts again.

== Obsolescence ==
This tedious method of updating and using legal books made sense in the days when each page of a hardcover book was typeset by hand from raw copy. It was easier to typeset a small 30-page pamphlet every year, rather than an entire 300-page book.

Today, many legal reference books are now maintained in real time on legal databases as "living" electronic documents with all amendments continuously merged in. Modern imagesetters, platesetters, desktop publishing software, and offset printing have almost completely automated the process of typesetting such books.

Therefore, many newer legal books are now simply republished every year (or every other year) in the form of easily recyclable paperback books; the Oregon Revised Statutes are an example of this newer practice.

== See also ==
- Looseleaf service – another common method of updating hard copy legal reference works
