= Title 46 of the United States Code =

U.S. federal statutes on shipping

Title 46 of the United States Code, titled "Shipping", outlines the federal laws contained within the United States Code that pertain to the shipping industry. It was gradually codified into the Positive Law of the United States, with partial codifications being enacted in the years 1988, 2002, and 2003. The title was fully codified into the Positive Law on October 6, 2006, when then-President George W. Bush signed Public Law 109-304 into law.

Portions of the U.S.C. labeled "transferred" have been moved to another title of the United States code either via an Act of Congress or by the Office of the Law Revision Counsel. The size of chapters of law vary - some contain several sections (such as 46 U.S.C. Ch. 51, which contains 16 sections), and some contain just a few (such as 46 U.S.C. Ch. 141, which contains just 4 sections).

== Outline of title 46 ==
Title 46

=== Subtitle I — General ===
Subtitle I

- Chapter 1 — Definitions
- Chapter 3 — Transferred
- Chapter 5 — Other General Provisions

=== Subtitle II — Vessels and Seamen ===
Subtitle II

- Part A — General Provisions
  - Chapter 21 — General
  - Chapter 23 — Operation of Vessels Generally
- Part B — Inspection and Regulation of Vessels
  - Chapter 31 — General
  - Chapter 32 — Management of Vessels
  - Chapter 33 — Inspection Generally
  - Chapter 35 — Carriage of Passengers
  - Chapter 37 — Carriage of Liquid Bulk Dangerous Cargoes
  - Chapter 39 — Repealed
  - Chapter 41 — Uninspected Vessels Generally
  - Chapter 43 — Recreational Vessels
  - Chapter 45 — Uninspected Commercial Fishing Industry Vessels
  - Chapter 47 — Abandonment of Barges
  - Chapter 49 — Oceangoing Non-Passenger Commercial Vessels
- Part C — Load Lines of Vessels
  - Chapter 51 — Load Lines
- Part D — Marine Casualties
  - Chapter 61 — Reporting Marine Casualties
  - Chapter 63 — Investigating Marine Casualties
- Part E — Merchant Seamen Licenses, Certificates, and Documents
  - Chapter 71 — Licenses and Certificates of Registry
  - Chapter 73 — Merchant Mariners' Documents
  - Chapter 75 — General Procedures for Licensing, Certification, and Documentation
  - Chapter 77 — Suspension and Revocation
- Part F — Manning of Vessels
  - Chapter 81 — General
  - Chapter 83 — Masters and Officers
  - Chapter 85 — Pilots
  - Chapter 87 — Unlicensed Personnel
  - Chapter 89 — Small Vessel Manning
  - Chapter 91 — Tank Vessel Manning Standards
  - Chapter 93 — Great Lakes Pilotage
- Part G — Merchant Seamen Protection and Relief
  - Chapter 101 — General
  - Chapter 103 — Foreign and Intercoastal Voyages
  - Chapter 105 — Coastwise Voyages
  - Chapter 106 — Fishing Voyages
  - Chapter 107 — Effects of Deceased Seamen
  - Chapter 109 — Proceedings on Unseaworthiness
  - Chapter 111 — Protection and Relief
  - Chapter 112 — Merchant Mariner Benefits
  - Chapter 113 — Official Logbooks
  - Chapter 115 — Offenses and Penalties
- Part H — Identification of Vessels
  - Chapter 121 — Documentation of Vessels
  - Chapter 123 — Numbering Undocumented Vessels
  - Chapter 125 — Vessel Identification System
- Part I — State Boating Safety Programs
  - Chapter 131 — Recreational Boating Safety
- Part J — Measurement of Vessels
  - Chapter 141 — General
  - Chapter 143 — Convention Measurement
  - Chapter 145 — Regulatory Measurement
  - Chapter 147 — Penalties
- Part K — National Maritime Transportation Advisory Committees
  - Chapter 151 — National Maritime Transportation Advisory Committees

=== Subtitle III — Maritime Liability ===
Subtitle III

- Chapter 301 — General Liability Provisions
- Chapter 303 — Death on the High Seas
- Chapter 305 — Exoneration and Limitation of Liability
- Chapter 307 — Liability of Water Carriers
- Chapter 309 — Suits in Admiralty Against the United States
- Chapter 311 — Suits Involving Public Vessels
- Chapter 313 — Commercial Instruments and Maritime Liens

=== Subtitle IV — Regulation of Ocean Shipping ===
Subtitle IV

- Part A — Ocean Shipping
  - Chapter 401 — General
  - Chapter 403 — Agreements
  - Chapter 405 — Tariffs, Service Contracts, Refunds, and Waivers
  - Chapter 407 — Controlled Carriers
  - Chapter 409 — Ocean Transportation Intermediaries
  - Chapter 411 — Prohibitions and Penalties
  - Chapter 413 — Enforcement
- Part B — Actions To Address Foreign Practices
  - Chapter 421 — Regulations Affecting Shipping in Foreign Trade
  - Chapter 423 — Foreign Shipping Practices
  - Chapter 425 — National Shipper Advisory Committee
- Part C — Miscellaneous
  - Chapter 441 — Evidence of Financial Responsibility for Passenger Transportation
- Part D — Federal Maritime Commission
  - Chapter 461 — Federal Maritime Commission

=== Subtitle V — Merchant Marine ===
Subtitle V

- Part A — General
  - Chapter 501 — Policy, Studies, and Reports
  - Chapter 503 — Administrative
  - Chapter 504 — Committees
  - Chapter 505 — Other General Provisions
- Part B — Merchant Marine Service
  - Chapter 511 — General
  - Chapter 513 — United States Merchant Marine Academy
  - Chapter 515 — State Maritime Academy Support Program
  - Chapter 517 — Other Support for Merchant Marine Training
  - Chapter 519 — Merchant Marine Awards
  - Chapter 521 — Miscellaneous
- Part C — Financial Assistance Programs
  - Chapter 531 — Maritime Security Fleet
  - Chapter 532 — Cable Security Fleet
  - Chapter 533 — Construction Reserve Funds
  - Chapter 534 — Tanker Security Fleet
  - Chapter 535 — Capital Construction Funds
  - Chapter 537 — Loans and Guarantees
  - Chapter 539 — War Risk Insurance
  - Chapter 541 — Miscellaneous
  - Chapter 543 — Port Infrastructure Development Program
- Part D — Promotional Programs
  - Chapter 551 — Coastwise Trade
  - Chapter 553 — Passenger and Cargo Preferences
  - Chapter 555 — Transferred
  - Chapter 556 — Marine Highways
- Part E — Control of Merchant Marine Capabilities
  - Chapter 561 — Restrictions on Transfers
  - Chapter 563 — Emergency Acquisition of Vessels
  - Chapter 565 — Essential Vessels Affected by Neutrality Act
- Part F — Government-Owned Merchant Vessels
  - Chapter 571 — General Authority
  - Chapter 573 — Vessel Trade-In Program
  - Chapter 575 — Construction, Charter, and Sale of Vessels
- Part G — Restrictions and Penalties
  - Chapter 581 — Restrictions and Penalties

=== Subtitle VI — Clearance, Tonnage Taxes, and Duties ===
Subtitle VI

- Chapter 601 — Arrival and Departure Requirements
- Chapter 603 — Tonnage Taxes and Light Money
- Chapter 605 — Discriminating Duties and Reciprocal Privileges

=== Subtitle VII — Security and Drug Enforcement ===
Subtitle VII

- Chapter 700 — Ports and Waterways Safety
- Chapter 701 — Port Security
- Chapter 703 — Maritime Security
- Chapter 705 — Maritime Drug Law Enforcement

=== Subtitle VIII — Miscellaneous ===
Subtitle VIII

- Chapter 801 — Wrecks and Salvage
- Chapter 803 — Ice and Derelicts
- Chapter 805 — Safe Containers for International Cargo
