= Wisconsin Legislative Reference Bureau =

Wisconsin government reference agency

Agency overview
- Formed: October 1, 1901; 125 years ago
- Headquarters: 1 East Main St. Madison, Wisconsin, U.S.; 43°4′25.676″N 89°22′56.420″W
- Employees: 60 (2021)
- Annual budget: $12,440,600 (2021)
- Agency executives: Richard A. Champagne, Director; Cathlene M. Hanaman, Deputy Director
- Website: legis.wisconsin.gov/lrb/

The Wisconsin Legislative Reference Bureau (LRB) is a nonpartisan agency that provides legal advice, legislative drafting services, and public policy research and analysis to the Wisconsin Legislature, and reference services to the legislature, state agencies, and the public.

The LRB staff is responsible for nearly all drafting of legislation in Wisconsin, operating at the request of legislators and state agencies. LRB staff also maintain and update the official Wisconsin statutes and the rules of the legislature. LRB publishes the biennial report of laws passed at each session of the legislature and the biennial report of the state government, the Wisconsin Blue Book. In addition, the LRB operates a legislative library, and provides research and library services to the general public.

The Wisconsin Legislature's Joint Committee on Legislative Organization acts as the governing body overseeing the Wisconsin Legislative Reference Bureau and selects the director, who employs and oversees all bureau staff. The director is Richard A. Champagne.

== History ==
The Wisconsin Legislative Reference Bureau traces its origin to the Wisconsin Legislative Reference Library, which was established by an act of the Legislature in 1901 (1901 Wisc. Act 168). The Legislative Reference Library was a first-of-its-kind Progressive Era innovation which sought to utilize the expertise of the University of Wisconsin and the resources of Wisconsin's state law library to improve the quality and consistency of the lawmaking process in the Legislature. The Wisconsin Legislative Reference Library became a model for the Congressional Research Service, which opened in 1914.

The Library's duties were expanded over the years. They became responsible for bill drafting in 1907 (1907 Wisc. Act 508), and became responsible for compiling and publishing the Blue Book in 1929 (1929 Wisc. Act 194). The Legislative Reference Library was renamed to the Legislative Reference Bureau in 1963.

Initially under the supervision of the Free Library Commission, the 1963 law also placed the bureau under the supervision of the Legislature's Joint Committee on Legislative Organization.

== Publications ==
- The Wisconsin Blue Book is a comprehensive report of the status, activities, organization, and personnel of the state government, as well as economic statistics, population data, and other information relevant to the state of the state. The Blue Book is published biennially.
- The Wisconsin Elections Project is a series of publications offering information on candidates, redistricting, election results, legislative actions, and historical data.
- The Wisconsin History Project is a series of articles on the history of Wisconsin politics and government.
- The Wisconsin Policy Project is a series on Wisconsin's current public policy issues.
- The LRB Reports cover a range of topics on the state government and the legislative process.
- Legislating in Wisconsin is a series of articles focusing on the organization of the Legislature and the legislative process.
- Reading the Constitution is a publication that explains aspects of the Wisconsin Constitution.

== See also ==
- Congressional Research Service
- California Office of Legislative Counsel
