= Office of the Law Revision Counsel =

Prepares and publishes the United States Code

Agency overview
- Formed: 1974
- Jurisdiction: United States
- Agency executive: Brian Lindsey, Law Revision Counsel
- Website: uscode.house.gov

The Office of the Law Revision Counsel of the United States House of Representatives prepares and publishes the United States Code, which is a consolidation and codification by subject matter of the general and permanent laws of the United States. The Office was created in 1974 when the provisions of Title II, sec. 205, of H.Res. 988, 93rd United States Congress, were enacted by Pub. L. 93–554, 88 Stat. 1777.

== Appointment and duties ==
The counsel is appointed by the Speaker of the House and must

prepare, and submit to the Committee on the Judiciary one title at a time, a complete compilation, restatement, and revision of the general and permanent laws of the United States which conforms to the understood policy, intent, and purpose of the Congress in the original enactments, with such amendments and corrections as will remove ambiguities, contradictions, and other imperfections both of substance and of form, separately stated, with a view to the enactment of each title as positive law."

The counsel takes each Act of Congress that covers more than one subject and makes the revisions indicated to each title of the United States Code. The counsel also regularly reviews the United States Code and proposes new titles to be enacted as positive law (meaning that they would displace all prior statutes on the same subject and become the law itself). Some proposed titles are simply updates of U.S.C. titles that were previously codified as prima facie evidence of the statutory law but have not yet been enacted as positive law. Other proposed titles collect the substance of all existing statutes on a particular subject from across the U.S.C. and the Statutes at Large into a new title.
