= Jacques Jiha =

American state government official

Director of the New York City Mayor's Office of Management and Budget
- In office November 1, 2020 – December 31, 2025
- Appointed by: Bill de Blasio
- Mayor: Bill de Blasio; Eric Adams
- Preceded by: Melanie Hartzog
- Succeeded by: Sherif Soliman

Personal details
- Born: Jacques Jiha; April 4, 1958 (age 68) Port-au-Prince, Haiti
- Spouse: Marie Chantale Fulcher
- Children: 2
- Education: Fordham University (BA); The New School for Social Research (PhD)

Jacques Jiha (born April 4, 1958) is an American former government official who served as the director of the New York City Mayor's Office of Management and Budget. In this role, he oversaw New York City’s fiscal policy, including the development of the expense and capital budgets, the city’s bond and borrowing program, and the budgets of more than 90 city agencies and related entities. Previously, he served as commissioner of the New York City Department of Finance, a position he has held in the administration of Mayor Bill de Blasio.

Jiha’s public service includes stints with the Ways and Means Committee of the New York State Assembly as the principal economist and executive director of the New York State Legislative Tax Study Commission. He worked as executive vice president, chief operating officer, and chief financial officer at the multimedia company Earl G. Graves Ltd./Black Enterprise.

== Early life and education ==
Jiha was born on April 4, 1958 in Port-au-Prince, Haiti. He moved to East Flatbush, Brooklyn in 1979. He worked as a parking garage attendant while attending Fordham College before graduating with a PhD in economics from The New School for Social Research in 1990.

== Career ==
From 2003 to 2005, Jiha worked as a deputy state comptroller and chief investment officer for the New York Common Retirement Fund under state comptroller Alan G. Hevesi, who eventually pleaded guilty for his role in a pay-for-play scheme. Jiha was pushed out of the comptroller’s office for not favoring recommended private equity managers.

Jiha was appointed as the New York City commissioner of finance by Mayor Bill de Blasio on April 8, 2014. Jiha succeeded Beth Goldman, the acting commissioner who had been serving since September 2013 following the resignation of David Frankel. Goldman was a holdover from the Bloomberg administration. On November 1, 2020, Jiha was appointed by de Blasio as Director of the New York City Mayor's Office of Management and Budget. In this role, he oversaw New York City’s fiscal policy, including the development of the expense and capital budgets, the city’s bond and borrowing program, and the budgets of more than 90 city agencies and related entities. On December 23, 2021, mayor-elect Eric Adams announced that Jiha would continue to serve as the budget director in the new administration. He vacated the position on December 31, 2025.

== Personal life ==
Jiha lives in Queens with his wife Marie Chantale Fulcher. They have two daughters: Christine and Kimberly.

Political offices
| Preceded by Melanie Hartzog | Director New York City Mayor's Office of Management and Budget; 2020–present | Incumbent |
