= Anthony Shorris =

Former Deputy Mayor of New York City

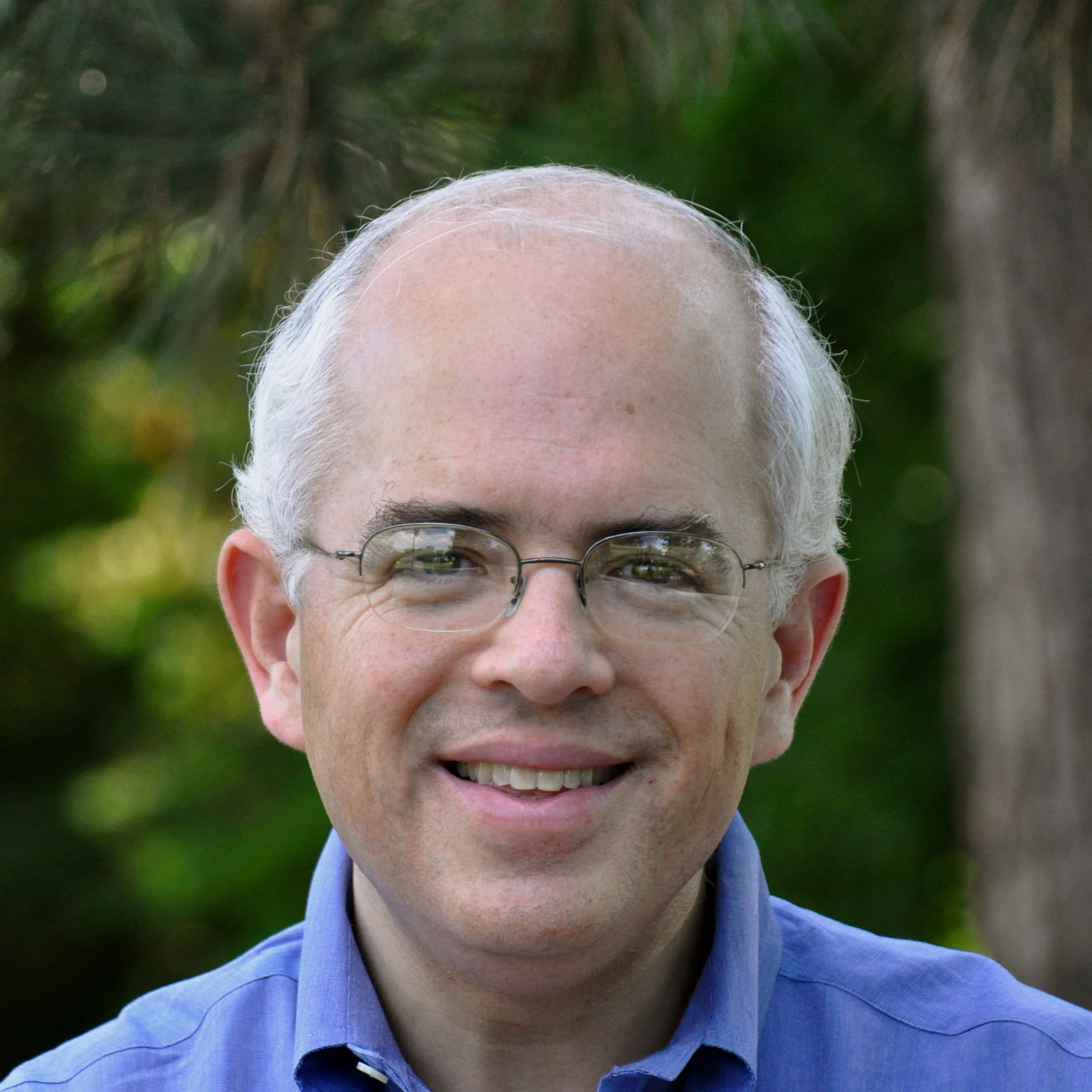

First Deputy Mayor of New York City
- In office January 1, 2014 – December 31, 2017
- Mayor: Bill de Blasio
- Preceded by: Patricia Harris
- Succeeded by: Dean Fuleihan

Executive Director of the Port Authority of New York and New Jersey
- In office January 1, 2007 – April 24, 2008
- Appointed by: Eliot Spitzer
- Preceded by: Kenneth Ringler
- Succeeded by: Christopher O. Ward

Commissioner of the New York City Department of Finance
- In office December 1, 1988 – December 31, 1989
- Appointed by: Ed Koch
- Preceded by: Stanley Grayson
- Succeeded by: Carol O'Cleireacain

Personal details
- Born: Anthony Ernest Shorris; March 7, 1957 (age 69) New York City, New York, U.S.
- Party: Democratic
- Spouse: Maria Laurino (m. 1993)
- Children: 1
- Education: Harvard University (BA); Princeton University (MPA)

Anthony Ernest Shorris (born March 7, 1957) is an American civil servant, educator, health care professional. He is a former executive director of the Port Authority of New York and New Jersey and a former first deputy mayor of New York City. Shorris is currently President and CEO of the New York City Economic Development Corporation and teaches in the graduate program at Princeton University.

== Early life and education ==
Shorris was born in New York City to noted author Earl Shorris and author Sylvia Shorris. A graduate of Collegiate School (New York City), Shorris received his AB in Government in 1977 from Harvard College and a Master's in Public Affairs from Princeton University's Woodrow Wilson School of Public and International Affairs in 1979.

== Career ==
=== Health care ===
Shorris first worked in health care at the non-profit organization HealthFirst Inc. where he served as Executive Vice President and Chief Operating Officer from 1995 to 2000. Shorris would then consult with Taft-Hartley funds on health care management issues, including the 1199 National Benefit Fund. From 2010 until 2013, Shorris served as the Vice Dean, Senior Vice President and Chief of Staff of the NYU Langone Medical Center.

=== Transportation and infrastructure ===
From 1991 to 1995, Shorris served as First Deputy Executive Director of the Port Authority, under Stanley Brezenoff. Shorris then served as the 11th Executive Director of the Port Authority of New York and New Jersey from 2007 to 2008. He was nominated to the position by Governor Eliot Spitzer. One of Governor Paterson's first moves as Governor was to fire Anthony Shorris. He was succeeded by Paterson appointee Christopher O. Ward. Subsequently, Shorris ran the Rudin Center for Transportation Policy at New York University's Robert F. Wagner School of Public Service and consulted with various government agencies on infrastructure policy.

=== Education ===
From 2000 to 2003, Shorris served as Deputy Chancellor for Operations and Policy in the Board of Education of the City of New York under chancellors Harold O. Levy and Joel I. Klein. In 2006 to 2007, Shorris also led the development of Governor Eliot Spitzer’s education reform initiative while serving as senior policy advisor to the transition. Shorris taught classes on education economics and policy during his tenure on the faculty of the Woodrow Wilson School at Princeton University, and acted as co-editor on the Brookings Institution’s publication in The Future of Children series, Excellence in the Classroom.

Until his appointment as First Deputy Mayor, Shorris served as Vice Dean of the NYU School of Medicine. Prior to that, he was a member of the faculty of the Robert F. Wagner School of Public Service and Director of the Rudin Center for Transportation Policy. He taught courses in transportation policy and crisis management. From 2003 to 2007, he taught at Princeton University’s Woodrow Wilson School of Public and International Affairs, where he also directed the Policy Research Institute for the Region (PRIOR). He held the Frederick H. Schultz Class of 1951 Professor of International Economic Policy chair at Princeton during 2003 to 2004. He is currently John Weinberg/Goldman Sachs Visiting Professor at the Princeton School of Public and International Affairs.

=== Finance and management ===
From 1984 to 1988, Shorris served as New York City's deputy budget director at the New York City Mayor's Office of Management and Budget (OMB), acting as an architect of Mayor Edward I. Koch's Ten Year Housing Plan. Shorris would go on to serve as City's Finance Commissioner from 1987 to 1989 under the Koch administration. Shorris currently serves as a member of the Advisory Board to the Federal Reserve Bank of New York. He has also worked as a Partner at McKinsey & Company.

=== New York City Economic Development Corporation ===
In July 2026, Mayor Zohran Mamdani selected Shorris to become the new leader of the New York City Economic Development Corporation.

=== Other work and publications ===
Shorris is a member of the Executive Committee of the Regional Plan Association and the Advisory Board of the Independent Budget Office of the City of New York. He is a member of the board of the United Hospital Fund of New York and represents the city on the board of the New York City Ballet. Shorris's work on education, infrastructure, and financial management has been published in The New York Times, The Newark Star-Ledger, The Nation, and The Century Foundation.

== Personal life ==
He lives with his wife, author Maria Laurino, and their son in New York City.

== Bibliography ==
- Paterson, David (2020). Black, Blind, & in Charge: A Story of Visionary Leadership and Overcoming Adversity. New York: Skyhorse Publishing
