= Peter Goldmark =

Peter Goldmark may refer to:

- Peter Carl Goldmark (1906–1977), engineer and inventor
- Peter C. Goldmark Jr. (born 1941), American environmentalist, publisher, financier, and executive director
- Peter J. Goldmark (born 1946), rancher, geneticist and American politician
