= Tondra =

Tondra may refer to:

- František Tondra (1936-2012) Roman Catholic bishop
- Jacques Tondra, a Congolese songwriter, who wrote the Republic of Congo national anthem La Congolaise
- Tondra Lynford, wife of Jeffrey H. Lynford
- Tondra (character), a fictional character from the 1946 adventure film Queen of the Amazons
- Tondra Reservoir, Philips, Montana, USA; an artificial lake, see List of lakes in Phillips County, Montana
- HD 148427 b (planet), Star Timir, Constellation Ophiuchus; an exoplanet named for the Bengali term for nap (sleep)
- Tondra (album), a 2012 record released by Emma Ejwertz
