= Dean Fuleihan =

American government official (born 1951)

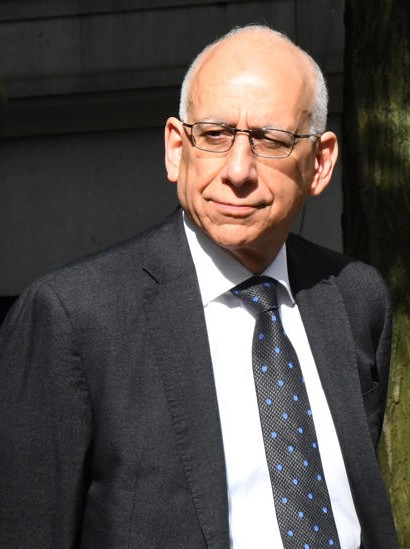
- Fuleihan in 2025

First Deputy Mayor of New York City
- Incumbent
- Assumed office January 1, 2026
- Mayor: Zohran Mamdani
- Preceded by: Randy Mastro
- In office January 1, 2018 – December 31, 2021
- Mayor: Bill de Blasio
- Preceded by: Anthony Shorris
- Succeeded by: Lorraine Grillo

Director of the New York City Mayor's Office of Management and Budget
- In office January 1, 2014 – December 31, 2017
- Appointed by: Bill de Blasio
- Preceded by: Mark Page
- Succeeded by: Melanie Hartzog

Personal details
- Born: January 27, 1951 (age 75)
- Party: Democratic
- Education: Alfred University (BA); Syracuse University

Dean Fuleihan (/ˌfʊləˈhæn/ FUUL-ə-HAN; born January 27, 1951) is an American government official, who has served as the First Deputy Mayor of New York City since 2026 under Mayor Zohran Mamdani, having served in the same role from 2018 to 2021 during the second term of Mayor Bill de Blasio. Previously, he served as the director of the New York City Mayor's Office of Management and Budget during de Blasio's first term, the New York State Assembly chief fiscal and policy advisor for over 30 years, and as an executive vice president at SUNY College of Nanoscale Science and Engineering.

== Early life and education ==
Fuleihan was born to a Lebanese-American family, with his mother's parents and his father having immigrated from Lebanon. He was raised in Syracuse, New York.

Fuleihan earned a Bachelor of Arts degree in economics from Alfred University and studied public finance at the Maxwell School of Citizenship and Public Affairs at Syracuse University.

== Career ==
Fuleihan began his career as a policy analyst in the New York State Assembly in 1978. He worked as a budget analyst and rose to become long-time Speaker Sheldon Silver's "budget guru", in charge of negotiating New York State's $130-billion budget. Fuleihan retired from the Assembly in 2011 and joined the SUNY Poly College of Nanoscale Science and Engineering as an executive vice president.

Bill de Blasio hired Fuleihan after his victory in the 2013 mayoral election. His first main task as the Director of the New York City Mayor's Office of Management and Budget was negotiating labor contracts that previous mayor, Michael Bloomberg, had left expired for years. Under de Blasio and Fuleihan, the budget of New York City grew from $72 billion to $85 billion.

In late November 2017, First Deputy Mayor Anthony Shorris announced he would step down from his post, and de Blasio offered the job to Fuleihan, who accepted the role as First Deputy Mayor effective January 2018. Fuleihan was replaced as Director of the New York City Mayor's Office of Management and Budget by Melanie Hartzog.

In June 2024, Governor Kathy Hochul appointed Fuleihan to the New York State Financial Control Board. On November 10, 2025, mayor-elect Zohran Mamdani announced that Fuleihan would be his first deputy mayor, having previously advised Mamdani since the primary campaign.

Civic offices
Preceded by Randy Mastro	First Deputy Mayor of New York City; 2026–present 2018–2021	Incumbent
Preceded by Anthony Shorris	First Deputy Mayor of New York City; 2026–present 2018–2021	Succeeded by Lorraine Grillo
Preceded by Mark Page	Budget Director of the New York City Mayor's Office of Management and Budget; 2014–2017	Succeeded by Melanie Hartzog
