= Lorraine Grillo =

American politician (born 1949)

First Deputy Mayor of New York City
- In office January 1, 2022 – December 31, 2022
- Mayor: Eric Adams
- Preceded by: Dean Fuleihan
- Succeeded by: Sheena Wright

Commissioner of the New York City Department of Design and Construction
- In office July 16, 2018 – December 31, 2021
- Mayor: Bill de Blasio
- Preceded by: Ana Barrio (interim)
- Succeeded by: Thomas Foley (acting)

Personal details
- Born: November 17, 1949 (age 76) Queens, New York, U.S.
- Party: Democratic

Lorraine Grillo (born November 17, 1949) is an American government official who served as the first deputy mayor of New York City in the administration of Mayor Eric Adams. Grillo served as senior advisor to Mayor Bill de Blasio for COVID recovery and commissioner of the New York City Department of Design and Construction.

== Early life ==
Grillo was born on November 17, 1949 in Queens.

She is from Astoria, Queens.

== Career ==
She began her career as community relations specialist for the New York City School Construction Authority. Grillo later served in several senior roles in the department before being appointed as CEO and president in 2014. On July 16, 2018, she was appointed commissioner of the New York City Department of Design and Construction. In December 2021, Mayor-elect Eric Adams announced that he had selected Grillo to serve as first deputy mayor. She assumed office in January 2022. Grillo succeeded former first deputy mayor Dean Fuleihan.

Adams replaced Grillo with close associate Sheena Wright, who resigned in October 2024.

Government offices
Preceded by Ana Barrio (interim)	Commissioner of the New York City Department of Design and Construction; 2018–2021	Succeeded by Thomas Foley
