= Stephen Berger =

American entrepreneur, investment banker, civil servant and political advisor

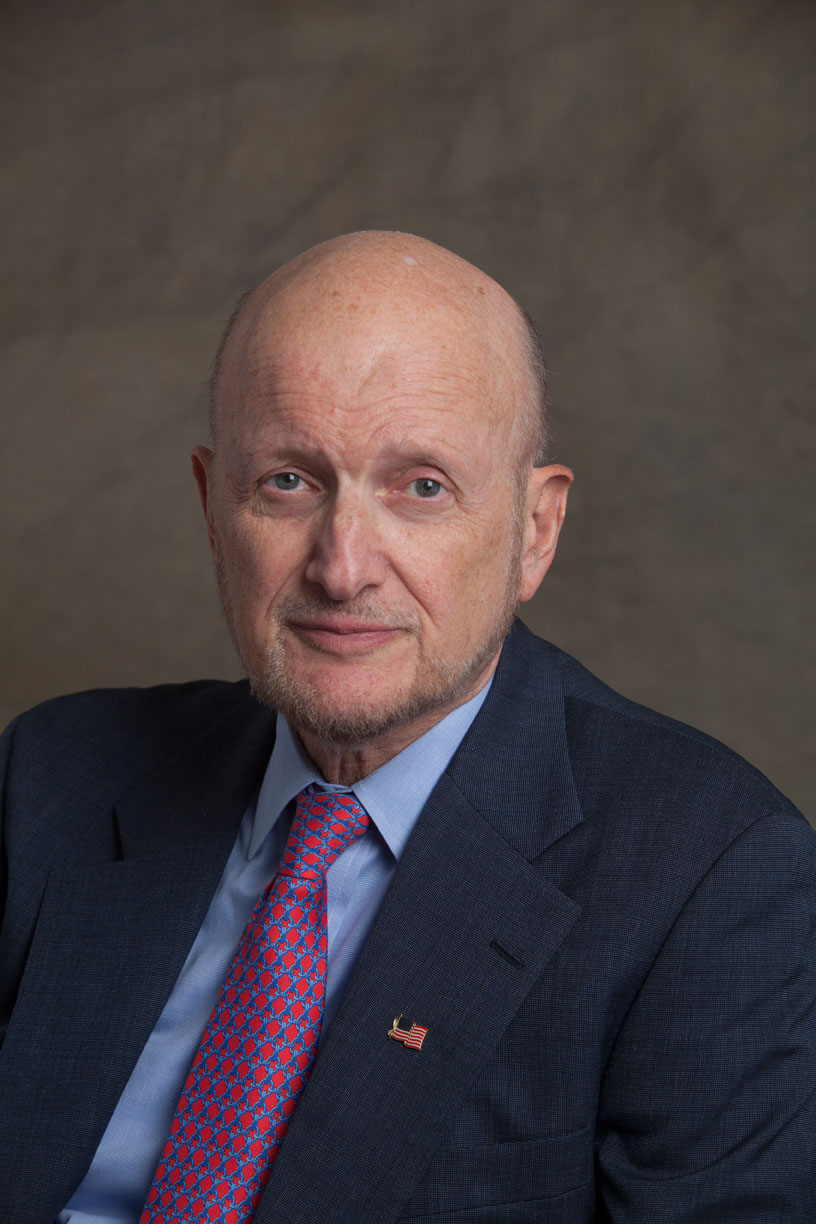
- Berger in 2014

Executive Director, Port Authority of New York and New Jersey
- Governor: Mario Cuomo
- Preceded by: Peter C. Goldmark Jr.
- Succeeded by: Stanley Brezenoff

Personal details
- Born: July 11, 1939 (age 87) New York City, US
- Spouse: Cynthia Wainwright (m. 1977)
- Children: 2
- Education: Brandeis University
- Occupation: Financial executive; Political advisor; Professor

Stephen Berger (born July 11, 1939) is an American entrepreneur, investment banker, civil servant and political advisor. His public service positions at the federal, state, and local levels for government agencies include: Chairman of the New York State Commission on Health Care Facilities in the 21st Century, Executive Director of the Port Authority of New York and New Jersey, Chairman of the United States Railway Association under President Jimmy Carter, and executive director of the New York Emergency Control Board for the City of New York.

He has been CEO of both private and public organizations, as a board member, corporate director, and private equity investor as well as a Professor of Public Administration at New York University's Graduate School of Public Administration.

== Early life and education ==
Berger was born and raised on the Lower East Side of Manhattan. His father, Saul Berger, was a politically active lawyer who ran for State Senate and City Council as an anti-Tammany candidate. His mother, Paula Rosenzweig Berger, held a two-year term as a Democratic co-leader in the district.

Berger attended New York City public schools, and graduated with Honors in Science from Stuyvesant High School in 1955. He went to college at Brandeis University and graduated magna cum laude with honors in history in 1959.

== Entry into politics ==
Berger entered the political arena to work for the Adlai Stevenson and John F. Kennedy presidential campaign in 1960. In 1964 he ran underdog Jonathan B. Bingham's successful congressional campaign in the Bronx against Charles A. Buckley, a Bronx Democratic fixture and powerhouse. He was executive assistant to Congressman Bingham from 1964 to 1968. He later managed the campaign of Bronx Borough President Herman Badillo, a former US Representative, in the 1969 New York mayoral primary and Richard Ottinger's bid for the U.S. Senate in 1970.

== The Rockefeller Commissions, 1972–1974 ==
In the early 1970s, Berger was on two major commissions under Governor Nelson Rockefeller. From 1972 to 1973, he held the position of executive director of The New York State Study Commission on New York City (the Scott Commission) that proposed sweeping changes in social services, fiscal systems, health and hospital services and government structure and jurisdiction. The Scott Commission studies warned of a multibillion-dollar city deficit when few had foreseen the up-coming mid-1970s fiscal crisis.

From 1973 to 1974, also under the Rockefeller administration, Berger was a consultant to the Rockefeller Commission on Critical Choices for Americans, a private study project on national and international policy created to study the various resources and stresses on resources that would determine the environmental and economic health of America over the next several decades.

== Carey administration and New York City’s financial crisis, 1975–1977 ==
Berger joined the administration of Governor Hugh L. Carey (1975–1982) as a planning specialist and later served as New York State Commissioner of Social Services and Member of the Board of Social Welfare.

In 1976, during New York's financial crisis, Carey appointed Berger to become the executive director of the New York State Emergency Control Board for the City of New York, which reviewed the city's $12.5 billion budget and designed a plan that enabled the city to reenter the credit markets and eventual financial recovery.

== New York University, the Metropolitan Transportation Authority, and the Carter administration, 1977 – 1985 ==
=== New York University ===
After leaving the Emergency Control Board in late 1977, Berger became a professor at the Graduate School of Public Administration at New York University, teaching part-time there for over 6 years.

=== Metropolitan Transportation Authority ===
In 1979, Carey appointed him a Member of the Board and Chairman of the finance committee of the Metropolitan Transportation Authority, which runs New York City subways, buses and commuter rail lines.

=== Jimmy Carter and United States Railway Association ===
On February 26, 1980, President Jimmy Carter announced the nomination of Berger as chairman of the board of directors of the United States Railway Association, a government corporation set up in 1974 to create Consolidated Rail Corporation (Conrail) out of six railroads that were in bankruptcy proceedings and funnel federal funds to Conrail, as well as monitor the systems performance.

== The Port Authority of New York and New Jersey, 1985–1990 ==
Governor Mario Cuomo of New York and Governor Thomas Kean of New Jersey appointed Berger as executive director of the Port Authority of New York and New Jersey on October 1, 1985, and he served in that capacity until 1990. He was responsible for directing New York and New Jersey's airports, port facilities, interstate network of tunnels, bridges and commuter trains and real estate investment, including the World Trade Center.

Berger's legacy was a $6 billion capital plan designed to modernize many of the agency's facilities, which included John F. Kennedy International Airport, LaGuardia Airport and Newark Liberty International Airport, the World Trade Center in lower Manhattan, marine terminals in both New York and New Jersey, two bus terminals and the commuter railroad.

He also directed a major reorganization of the port authority, which had some 9,500 employees and a $2.2 billion annual budget. The agency also undertook new and improved services, including the commencement of ferry operations from Hoboken, NJ to New York for the first time in 22 years.

== Corporate development and finance ==
After 1977, he moved to Wall Street holding senior posts at Oppenheimer & Company from 1981–1983 and Odyssey Partners from 1983–1985.

=== GE Capital ===
From 1990–1993, Berger joined Financial Guaranty Insurance Co., a municipal bond insurer wholly owned by GE Capital, as chairman and CEO, and was appointed Executive Vice-president of GE Capital in 1992. He was responsible for a portfolio of businesses, including the Corporate Finance Group, Private Equity Investment, Railcar Services, Transport International Pool, GE Capital Modular Space and The Financial Guaranty Insurance Company.

Berger was also responsible for establishing and growing GE Capital's insurance annuity business, with the acquisitions of Great Northern Annuity Insurance Company (GNA) from Weyerhaeuser Company and United Pacific Life Insurance Company from the Reliance Group. He resigned from GE Capital in 1993.

=== Odyssey Partners ===
In 1993, Berger returned to Odyssey Partners L.P. as a general partner after an eight-year absence. In 1997, Berger was one of the founders of Odyssey Investment Partners, LLC., a private New York investment firm that comprised the private equity operations of Odyssey Partners. He currently serves as Chairman of Odyssey Investment Partners.

== Recent public service ==
Berger is a director of the Partnership for New York City and the former co-chair of the Governor's Committee on Scholastic Achievement.

Berger continued his work in the New York health care system and chaired the Governor's Task Force on Health Care Reform from 2003 to 2005.

In early 2005, Governor George Pataki selected Berger to chair the New York State Commission on Health Care Facilities in the 21st Century. This commission (often described as the Berger Commission) resulted in the first major restructuring of New York's health-care delivery system. In its final report, issued in November 2006, it called for consolidations, closures, conversions and large-scale restructurings. In the end, nine institutions closed and 48 restructured, in many cases over the objections of health care executives, politicians and community residents.

Berger was also a Member of the Governor Andrew Cuomo's Medicaid Redesign Team during 2010–2011. Berger chaired the Health System Redesign Group, which proposed a restructuring of Brooklyn's Hospitals and Primary Care Facilities.

Berger serves as a member of State's Value Based Pricing Committee and the Project Approval and Oversight Panel for the Delivery System Reform Incentive Payment program, guiding New York's investment of $6 billion in federal funds, through the State's Medicaid waiver.

Berger the Treasurer and member of the board of directors of the Metropolitan Opera and a member of the Executive Committee.

Berger is a Trustee of Brandeis University and Chair of the Resources (Finance) Committee.

Berger received the 2023 New York Citizen’s Budget Commission Felix Rohatyn Award for Public Service.

== Quotes ==
On Berger's work as Chairman of the New York State Commission on Health Care Facilities:

"Given his history as someone who is sent in to do difficult jobs that no one else wants to do, we think he’s coming in with his knives sharpened."

Mr. Berger (...) whose name has rarely appeared in print without words like "sharp" and "aggressive" appended to it—is among the first to acknowledge that he is a fiscal tough guy. "I am," said Mr. Berger (...) and then qualified himself a bit. "'Tough' is a very strange word," he said. "I have a reputation of being honest with people, asking questions, and being willing ultimately to say what I think. I don’t think that's particularly tough. I think that's particularly what you need to survive in the world."

In an interview with Crain's New York, he spoke about reforming Medicare and said:

"(…) we refuse to face the issues related to the last 180 days of life. Often the terminally ill are kept alive through major interventions, and the process of dying is prolonged unnecessarily. We are not dealing with the needs of the dying, but the assumptions and needs of the living. That is not fair. It is also wrong morally, and massively expensive."

When people suggested after the George Washington Bridge scandal that it might make sense to break up the enormous organization of which he'd once been head, Berger said: "It could be simpler and cleaner if you separated the different parts of the Port into individual agencies. It would also be insane."

Former New York City Mayor Ed Koch once said of him: "Twenty years ago, if you had a conversation with Steve Berger you couldn’t get a word in edgewise. Now if you have a conversation, he allows you to speak for 10 minutes out of each hour."

== Personal life ==
Mr. Berger married Cynthia Wainwright on September 24, 1977. She is President of the Board of the Churchill School in New York City and serves as President of The Bridge, a mental health agency. They have two daughters, Robin and Diana.

== Awards ==
- American Jewish Congress NY NJ Metropolitan Award (1987)
- Distinguished Public Service Award for Outstanding Contribution to NY State 1989 from the Rockefeller College of Public Affairs & Policy (1989)
- B'nai B'rith Civic Achievement Award (1989)
- United Hospital Fund Special Tribute (2015)

== See also ==
- Austin Tobin
- Richard Ravitch
- Christopher O. Ward
- Eugenius Harvey Outerbridge
