= New York City Mayor's Office of Management and Budget =

New York City government agency

Office of Management and Budget
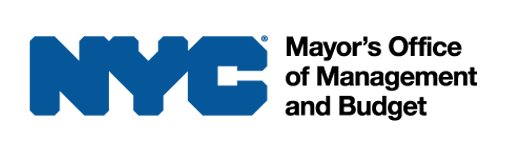

Agency overview
- Jurisdiction: New York City
- Headquarters: 255 Greenwich St., New York, NY 10007
- Employees: 350
- Agency executive: Sherif Soliman, Budget Director
- Website: nyc.gov/omb

The New York City Mayor's Office of Management and Budget (OMB), formerly New York City Office of Management and Budget, is the New York City government's chief financial agency, organized as part of the New York City Mayor's office. OMB staff, under the direction of the Mayor and the Budget Director, assemble and oversee the expense, revenue, and capital budgets for the city. The City of New York funds the activities of approximately 70 agencies with more than 300,000 full-time and full-time equivalent employees.

OMB evaluates the cost-effectiveness of city services and proposals, both from the agencies and New York City Council. OMB employs economists to provide forecasts on city, state, nation, and world economies. OMB also manages the city's capital financing programs through the issuing of bonds, and conducts legal reviews of capital projects financed with bond proceeds.

New York City has the largest municipal budget in the United States at $115.9 billion (as of the City's Fiscal Year 2026 June Adopted Financial Plan).

== History ==
By 1788, the treasurer of the city prepared the budget, and in 1830 this duty fell to the comptroller. In 1853, a Board of Commissioners was established comprising the mayor, the comptroller, and the presidents of the Board of Alderman and the Board of Assistants, to pass on the appropriations of the Alms House Department and the Board of Education before such appropriations should be submitted to the Board of Supervisors. This lasted until 1871, when the Board of Estimate and Apportionment was established and charged with the duty of apportioning the revenue resulting from tax assessments on property valuation.

In 1881, the commissioners of accounts prepared an annual statement of expenditures of all departments for use in budgeting. In 1914, a separate budget and efficiency staff was set up in the Office of the Commissioners of Accounts. The Board of Estimate and Apportionment also set up three agencies to assist in the preparation of the budget - the Bureau of Standards (later the Bureau of Personnel Service), the Bureau of Contract Supervision, and the Committee on Education. All of these agencies were abolished in 1918 and the Board of Estimate and Apportionment's examiners, who were transferred to the secretary's office at that time, later became the nucleus of the Bureau of the Budget. In 1924, the position of Director of Budget was created as part of the Mayor's Office by the Board of Estimate and Apportionment. In 1933 The Bureau of the Budget was established by Local Law 11 with the Director of the Budget at its head.

In 1976, the bureau was renamed the Office of Management and Budget, and was granted its current responsibility for assisting the mayor in developing and implementing the city's budget, and for advising the mayor on policy affecting the city's fiscal stability and the effectiveness of city services.

== Budget Director ==
The agency is headed by a commissioner-level appointment, known as the budget director, responsible for drafting the city's budget, turning the mayor's policy goals into a fiscally responsible and balanced budget. The budget director also serves ex officio on various boards, including the New York City Municipal Water Authority, which issues bonds for the capital plan of the NYC Department of Environmental Protection, the New York City Transitional Finance Authority, and TSASC, Inc., a local development corporation whose debt is secured by tobacco settlement revenues. Both issue bonds to finance the city’s capital plan. The current budget director is Sherif Soliman.

=== Budget directors ===
Name	Years in Office	Administration
Abraham Beame	1952-1961	Vincent R. Impellitteri, Robert F. Wagner Jr.
Frederick O'R. Hayes	1966–1970	John Lindsay
Edward K. Hamilton	1970-1971	John Lindsay
David Grossman	1971–1974	John Lindsay
Melvin Lechner	1974-1976	Abraham Beame
	1976-1977	Abraham Beame
James Brigham	1978-1981	Ed Koch
Alair Townshend	1981-1985	Ed Koch
Paul Dickstein	1985-1988	Ed Koch
Stanley Grayson	1988-1990	Ed Koch
Philip R. Michael	1990-1993	David Dinkins
Carol O'Cleireacain	1993	David Dinkins
Abraham Lackman	1994-1995	Rudy Giuliani
Marc Shaw	1995	Rudy Giuliani
Joe Lhota	1995-2001	Rudy Giuliani
Mark N. Page	2002-2014	Michael Bloomberg
Dean Fuleihan	2014-2017	Bill de Blasio
Melanie Hartzog	2018-2020	Bill de Blasio
Jacques Jiha	2020–2025	Bill de Blasio, Eric Adams
Sherif Soliman	2026-	Zohran Mamdani

== Notable former employees ==
- Johanna Contreras, public official
- Peter C. Goldmark Jr., public servant, journalist former assistant director
- Michael P. Jacobson, professor, former deputy director
- Helen Rosenthal, New York City councilmember, former assistant director
- Anthony Shorris, former first deputy mayor, former deputy director
- David Yassky, law professor, former budget analyst

== See also ==
- Economy of New York City
- New York City Department of Finance
