= Hizzoner (disambiguation) =

Hizzoner (and Herroner on occasion) is a corruption of the title "His Honor", used in particular to refer irreverently to the mayor of larger cities in the United States, especially the mayors of New York City, Philadelphia and Chicago.

The term can further refer to:

- Hizzoner Big Bill Thompson, an idyll of Chicago, a 1930 book by journalist John Bright about Chicago mayor William Hale Thompson
- Hizzoner, a 1933 short film directed by Ray McCarey
- Hizzonner, an American sitcom that aired on NBC for one season in 1979
- Hizzoner, a 1984 New York Emmy Award-winning play by Paul Shyre about Mayor Fiorello La Guardia of New York City
- Hizzoner: Daley the First, a 2006 play by Neil Giuntoli about Mayor Richard J. Daley of Chicago
