= A. Gerdes Kuhbach =

American lawyer and government official

Executive Director of the Port Authority of New York and New Jersey
- In office 1973–1977
- Governor: Malcolm Wilson; Brendan Byrne
- Preceded by: Matthias Lukens
- Succeeded by: Peter C. Goldmark, Jr.

Personal details
- Born: November 21, 1916 The Bronx, New York
- Died: August 19, 1997 Summit, New Jersey
- Education: Columbia College (BA); Columbia Law School (LLB)

A. Gerdes Kuhbach (November 21, 1916 – August 19, 1997) was an American lawyer and government official. He served as executive director of the Port Authority of New York and New Jersey.

== Biography ==
Kuhbach was born in The Bronx and graduated from Columbia College in 1938 and Columbia Law School in 1940.

Kuhbach joined the New Haven Railroad in 1941 after graduating from Columbia, as an assistant counsel. He then became chief financial officer and executive vice president. He joined the Port Authority in 1962 as director of finance as oversaw projects including the construction of the World Trade Center and airport expansions.

Kuhbach was named acting executive director in 1973 of the Port Authority. He served as executive director from 1974 to 1977 under New York Governors Malcolm Wilson and Hugh Carey and New Jersey Governor Brendan Byrne, who opposed his tenure by arguing that he lacked independence by serving as a tool of chairman William Ronan and a strong enough commitment to push mass transit projects. After stepping down, remained a senior financial advisor until 1982.

Kuhbach died on August 19, 1997, at 80 years old.
