= Institute for State and Local Governance =

US research organization

Coordinates: 40.74791°N 73.98396°W

CUNY Institute of State and Local Governance (ISLG)
- Established: 2013
- Staff: 51-200 Employees
- Address: 10 East 34th Street, New York, NY 10016
- Location: City University of New York
- Website: islg.cuny.edu

The CUNY Institute for State and Local Governance (ISLG) is a research and policy organization based out of City University of New York. ISLG was founded in 2013 by Michael P. Jacobson, a former President of the Vera Institute of Justice and veteran government official under the Dinkins and Giuliani administrations in New York City.

Marc Shaw, former First Deputy Mayor of Michael Bloomberg and Senior Advisor to CUNY's Chancellor for Fiscal Policy, serves as the Chair of the ISLG Advisory Board.

Philanthropic partners of the Institute include The Rockefeller Foundation, the MacArthur Foundation, Open Society Foundations, Arnold Ventures, and local and federal government agencies.

== Mission ==
ISLG's work focuses on solving local and national policy issues surrounding criminal justice, fiscal policy, and inequality. This work is based on a growing acknowledgement that government cannot tackle huge societal problems alone and without data.

Prior to joining ISLG, Mr. Jacobson was encouraging elected officials to use data to inform policy decisions. He co-authored a thought piece recapping public and safety trends that occurred during the Bloomberg administration and challenges the next mayor would face in this area when he/she took office. The piece titled, "A Mayoral Agenda for Justice and Safety in New York City," noted that NYC's crime rates were on the decline. But the decline coincided with the highly unpopular and controversial policing tactic of stop and frisk. Mr. Jacobson noted that these tactics were creating distrust within communities and widespread anti-police sentiment. It would be up to the next mayor, Mr. Jacobson argued, to maintain low crime rates while simultaneously understanding if these police tactics were responsible for the drop in crime.

== Equality indicators ==
ISLG has undertaken development of a tool that measures inequality levels in U.S. and international cities, the Equality Indicators. New York City was the pilot site for this tool. After an 18-month data collection and analysis process, NYC's score was released in October 2015. In October 2016 and in each year thereafter, ISLG will release a change score which will indicate whether inequalities are increasing or decreasing. To date, this is the most comprehensive tool of its kind as it focuses on how 12 disadvantaged groups (e.g. racial minorities, LGBTQ, people with disabilities) fare in economy, education, health, housing, justice, and services. This work is consistent with the agenda of NYC Mayor Bill de Blasio, who has made stamping out inequality a platform of his administration.

== Criminal Justice Investment Initiative ==
In late 2014, ISLG was hired as a technical assistance consultant by the Manhattan District Attorney's Office for its Criminal Justice Investment Initiative (CJII). As part of this initiative, approximately $250 million of asset forfeiture funds will be awarded to organizations that focus on improving public safety and increasing the overall fairness of the criminal justice system. These types of programs range from prevention-oriented programs built around early intervention for those at risk of becoming criminals to programs that work with victims of crime and that evaluate the effectiveness of specific projects and initiatives. They dovetail with President Obama's national initiative on criminal justice reform. The President asked the Department of Justice to look closely at mandatory minimum sentencing for non-violent drug offenders, the practice of solitary confinement, giving the incarcerated job training while they serve time, and re-evaluating the death penalty.

== Cost-benefit analysis ==
ISLG is applying cost-benefit analysis to juvenile justice interventions to determine their feasibility within pay for success contracts. Because the cost of crime is ostensibly high and increasing, ISLG seeks to contribute to the justice landscape by illuminating programs that are effective and that provide short and long term cost savings to organizations and government. Currently, ISLG is partnering with the National Council on Crime and Delinquency to conduct a Pay for Success feasibility assessment of three juvenile justice programs in the U.S. The interventions range in type from prevention for at risk youth to court processing and alternatives to detention. ISLG is looking at individual and programmatic population data as well as financial data to assess if the benefits of each program outweigh their opportunity costs.

For adults, ISLG evaluates criminal justice practices like pre-trial detainment or jail through a lens of cost benefit analysis. When those accused of crimes await trial in jail as opposed to paying bail, they are removed from family, work, and education. Pre-trial detainees await disposition of felony charges an average of 95 days. This is an expensive proposition. In a New York Times blog on this issue, Mr. Jacobson proposed NYC could save $125 million if case processing times were improved and those accused of crimes did not need to spend excessive amounts of time in jail.

In the future, ISLG seeks to expand its cost benefit analysis expertise into other areas such as welfare, health, education, and transportation.

== Safety and Justice Challenge ==
ISLG is a partner in the John D. and Catherine T. MacArthur Foundation's Safety and Justice Challenge Initiative, which aims to reduce jail populations nationwide-as well as racial and ethnic disparities in those populations-through two phases of work. During the first phase, the Foundation awarded grants to 20 jurisdictions to create plans that will reduce their local jail populations through fairer, more effective criminal justice practices and policies. In Phase II, ten of those jurisdictions will receive a second round of funding to implement their reform plans. ISLG serves as the national intermediary for the initiative, providing oversight on project management and design, and is also responsible for monitoring the performance of participating jurisdictions throughout the life of the initiative.
