= Michael P. Jacobson =

American sociologist

Michael Jacobson
- Michael Paul Jacobson
- Born: October 23, 1953 (age 72)
- Occupations: scholar, professor

Academic background
- Education: CUNY Graduate Center (Ph.D, 1985)
- Thesis: The Enigmatic Crime: A Study of Arson in New York City (1985)
- Doctoral advisor: Edward Sagarin

Academic work
- Discipline: Sociologist
- Sub-discipline: Criminologist
- Institutions: John Jay College of Criminal Justice (1998 - 2005); CUNY Graduate Center (2013)

Michael P. Jacobson (born October 24, 1953) is the founder and director of the Institute for State and Local Governance at the City University of New York (CUNY). He is also the chair of the New York City Criminal Justice Agency.

== Education and career ==
Jacobson received his Ph.D. in sociology from CUNY Graduate Center. In 1984, he began working at the New York City Mayor's Office of Management and Budget, where he became the deputy budget director before leaving in 1992. That same year, he became New York City's probation commissioner, a position he held until 1996. From 1995 to 1998, he also served as New York City's Correction Commissioner. From 1998 to 2005, he was a professor at the John Jay College of Criminal Justice and the CUNY Graduate Center. In January 2005, he became the fourth director of the Vera Institute of Justice, replacing Christopher Stone. Jacobson held this position until joining CUNY in May 2013 to help found their Institute for State and Local Governance.
