= Peter C. Goldmark Jr. =

American environmentalist, journalist, publisher, financier, and nonprofit executive

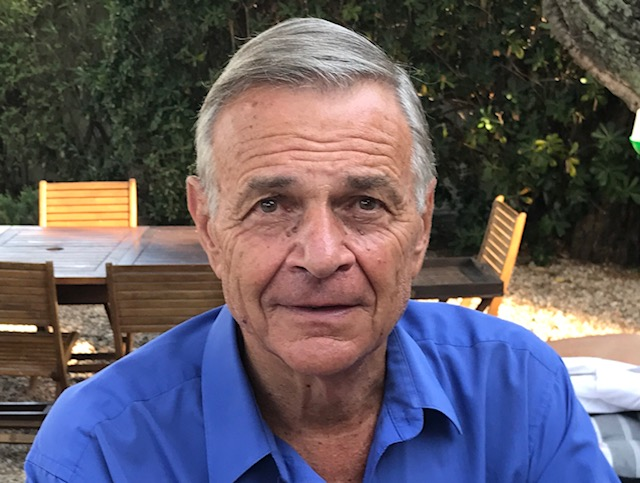
- Goldmark in 2017

10th President of the Rockefeller Foundation
- In office 1988–1997
- Preceded by: Richard Wall Lyman
- Succeeded by: Gordon Conway

Executive Director of the Port Authority of New York and New Jersey
- In office 1977–1985
- Governor: Hugh Carey; Mario Cuomo
- Preceded by: A. Gerdes Kuhbach
- Succeeded by: Stephen Berger

Budget Director of New York
- In office 1975–1977
- Governor: Hugh Carey
- Preceded by: Richard Dunham
- Succeeded by: Philip L. Tola

Secretary of Human Services of Massachusetts
- In office 1971–1975
- Governor: Francis W. Sargent
- Preceded by: Position created
- Succeeded by: Lucy W. Benson

Personal details
- Born: December 2, 1940 (age 85)
- Parent(s): Peter C. Goldmark, Frances Trainer Salant
- Education: Harvard University
- Occupation: Environmentalist, journalist, director of governmental, philanthropic, and media organizations

Peter Carl Goldmark Jr. (born December 2, 1940) is an American retired publisher and journalist who highlighted environmental and social issues. Goldmark retired in 2010 as director of the Environmental Defense Fund's climate and air program. He was previously the chairman and CEO of the International Herald Tribune, the president of the Rockefeller Foundation, the executive director of the Port Authority of New York and New Jersey, and the budget director for the State of New York. He is noted for being an advocate for social causes and environmental issues in many of his assignments. He was responsible for management of multi-billion-dollar budgets in some of his posts.

== Personal life ==
Goldmark is the son of Peter Carl Goldmark, who led the development of LP records and invented the first practical color television, among other innovations, and the former Frances Trainer. He graduated from Choate Rosemary Hall in 1958 and graduated from Harvard University in 1962. Thereafter he taught at the Putney School in Vermont for two years, where he met his wife, née Aliette Marie Misson. Goldmark has maintained a residence in Brooklyn, New York, since his tenure with the Rockefeller Foundation.

== Career ==
Goldmark's career started with state government in Massachusetts and New York, progressed to leadership in multiple philanthropic organizations as president of the Rockefeller Foundation, continued to journalism and publishing with Newsday and the International Herald Tribune and included a leadership role in the Environmental Defense Fund.

=== Governmental positions ===
Goldmark was selected for responsible positions in government at a young age, starting with heading the Massachusetts Department of Human Services at age 30. He next was the budget director of the State of New York under Governor Hugh L. Carey from 1975 to 1977 where he was credited with being the architect of the rescue of both the state and New York City from a budget crisis. Next, he headed the Port Authority of New York and New Jersey as executive director for eight years, where he was credited with "having transformed a sluggish bistate agency into an energetic vehicle for regional economic improvement." He also worked for several other New York politicians, including New York City mayor, John Lindsay, in 1970 as chief of staff and by 1975 as budget director and governor, Eliot Spitzer, as co-chair of his transition team.

=== Philanthropic organizations ===
In 1988, the Rockefeller Foundation chose Goldmark to become its eleventh president and direct the deployment of the foundation's reported $1.7 billions in assets at the time. During his tenure, he reportedly grew the foundation's assets by $1 billion and directed programs towards school reforms, the education of women and poor Americans. He left the organization in 1997. Goldmark served on the boards of directors of several other philanthropic or civic organizations, including the Whitehead Institute for Biomedical Research and the National Commission on Civic Renewal.

=== Journalism ===
In 1985, he became senior vice president of the Times Mirror Company's Newsday for two years. Following his service with the Rockefeller Foundation, he was the publisher of the International Herald Tribune from 1998 to 2003. A 2020 opinion piece for CNN addressed a strategy for state and municipal governments to employ during budget crises. As of 2012, Goldmark continued to write weekly columns for Newsday on a variety of topics.

=== Environmentalism ===
After leaving the International Herald Tribune, Goldmark became program director for climate and air at the Environmental Defense Fund (EDF), where he worked on projects in India, Mexico, Brazil, China, and United States. He was a strong advocate for sustainable development, noting the interplay of global climate change, financing, technologies and the institutions, including foundations, that can address these factors. Upon retiring from the EDF in 2010, he expressed disappointment that his generation had failed to solve the world's environmental issues. He was especially concerned about the lack of action within the U.S. government and held hope that other governments of populous countries might realize the need for action before effects like global warming become irreversible.

== Honors and legacy ==
In 1977, Goldmark was elected as a fellow of the National Academy of Public Administration.

On four occasions from 1981 to 1994, Goldmark was designated one of the "Young Leaders" selected by the French-American Foundation, which matches French and American "up-and-coming leaders" in various walks of life and brings them together for five days of discussions on topics of common interest.

Goldmark received the Wilson Wyatt National Award for Urban Revitalization and became a member of the French Legion of Honor. He has been a visiting professor at noted schools, including the Harvard Kennedy School at Harvard University, Yale University, Brandeis University, and the Woodrow Wilson School of Princeton University. He is a life member of the Council on Foreign Relations.

== See also ==
- Robert Moses
- Austin Tobin
- Christopher O. Ward
- Richard Ravitch

Preceded by Richard Wall Lyman	President of the Rockefeller Foundation; 1988–1997	Succeeded by Gordon Conway
Preceded by A. Gerdes Kuhbach	Executive Director of the Port Authority of New York and New Jersey; 1977–1984	Succeeded by Stephen Berger
Preceded by Richard Dunham	New York State Budget Director; 1975–1977	Succeeded by Philip L. Tola
Preceded by Position created	Massachusetts Secretary of Human Services; 1971–1975	Succeeded by Lucy W. Benson
