= Jeffrey H. Lynford =

New York Civic and Business Figure

Jeffrey H. Lynford (born October 7, 1947) is a financier, philanthropist and civic leader from New York currently serving as president and CEO of Educational Housing Services and as vice chairman of The Port Authority of New York and New Jersey. He was the co-founder of the Wellsford group of public and private companies and has served as chairman of three exchange-listed corporations which were taken public during his tenure. He has served on the boards of three institutions of higher learning: New York University, NYU Tandon School of Engineering, and the School of Public and International Affairs at Princeton University.

== Career ==
Lynford has co-founded the following firms:

- Wellsford Residential Property Trust (NYSE:WRP) served as chairman from 1992 to 1997
- Wellsford Real Properties, Inc. (AMEX:WRP) served as chairman from 1997 to 2007
- Reis, Inc. (NASDAQ:REIS) served as chairman from 2007 to 2010
- Wellsford Strategic Partners LLC (2008 to present)

== Corporate governance ==
Lynford has served on the boards of publicly reporting corporations and mutual funds as well as non-profit organizations, including:

- Citizens Budget Commission (2002 to 2008)
- Cohen & Steers: six corporate real estate mutual funds (1987 to 2001)
- Equity Residential: S&P 500 REIT (1996 to 2002)
- Global Heritage Fund (2004 to 2011)
- Lower East Side Tenement Museum (2001 to 2007)
- National Trust for Historic Preservation (1987 to 1996)
- New York State Council on the Arts (2007 to 2013)
- New York University (2008 to 2021)
- NYU Tandon School of Engineering (1997 to 2021)
- Princeton School of Public and International Affairs (1994 to 2006)
- The Port Authority of New York & New Jersey (2011 to present)
- Trust for Governors Island (2010 to 2013)

== Personal ==
He is married to Tondra Lynford; they have four children and two grandchildren.

== Philanthropy ==
Lynford is the grantor of the Lynford Family Charitable Trust which has supported hundreds of not-for-profit organizations since its inception in 1984. The Trust - which focuses its giving in the areas of education and health, historic preservation, performing and visual arts, and public policy - has endowed the following fellowships Marion J. Levy, Jr. Fellowship at Princeton University, Lynford Family International Fellows at Weill Cornell Medical College, Lynford-Chudnovsky Fellowship at NYU Tandon School of Engineering, and Rising Stars at Caramoor Center for Music and the Arts. Further, the Lynford Family Charitable Trust sponsors the NYU Tandon School of Engineering Lynford Lecture Series, an annual presentation of the work of mathematicians, engineers, and scientists.

== Education ==
Princeton University (MPA), Fordham Law School (JD), and University at Buffalo (BA)
