= Stanley Brezenoff =

American civil servant (born 1937)

Executive Director of the Port Authority of New York and New Jersey
- In office 1990–1995
- Nominated by: Mario Cuomo
- Preceded by: Stephen Berger
- Succeeded by: George Marlin

Deputy Mayor of New York City
- In office January 1, 1985 – January 1, 1989
- Appointed by: Ed Koch

Personal details
- Born: December 3, 1937 (age 88) New York City, New York

Stanley Brezenoff (born 1937) is a civil servant who served as Executive Director of the Port Authority of New York and New Jersey from 1990 to 1995. He was appointed by Mario Cuomo, and stepped down when George Pataki assumed the office. He also served as a Deputy Mayor under Ed Koch from 1984 to 1989. He worked with future Executive Director, Christopher O. Ward, in helping re-establish freight to Howland Hook.

He was also the head of NYC Health + Hospitals from 1981 to 1984 under Mayor Ed Koch. Furthermore, Brezenoff served in the De Blasio administration as interim Chairman of NYCHA .

== See also ==
- Paterson, David "Black, Blind, & In Charge: A Story of Visionary Leadership and Overcoming Adversity."Skyhorse Publishing. New York, New York, 2020
