= Port Authority of New York and New Jersey =

American infrastructure agency

- PANYNJ's logo since 2020

- Flag used by the Port Authority, a bicolor of Buff and Blue with the coat of arms of New Jersey and New York surmounted on gold fringe
- Formation: April 30, 1921; 105 years ago
- Type: Port district
- Headquarters: 4 World Trade Center (150 Greenwich Street); Manhattan, New York City, New York, 10007, U.S.
- Region served: Port of New York and New Jersey
- Executive Director: Kathryn Garcia
- Website: panynj.gov

The Port Authority of New York and New Jersey (PANYNJ or simply the Port Authority) is a joint venture between the U.S. states of New York and New Jersey, established in 1921 through an interstate compact authorized by the United States Congress. The Port Authority oversees much of the regional transportation infrastructure, including bridges, tunnels, airports, and seaports within the Port of New York and New Jersey's jurisdiction. This 1,500-square-mile (3,900 km^{2}) port district is generally encompassed within a 25-mile (40 km) radius of the Statue of Liberty National Monument. The Port Authority is headquartered at 4 World Trade Center in Lower Manhattan.

The Port Authority operates the Port Newark–Elizabeth Marine Terminal, which consistently ranks among the largest ports in the United States by tonnage handled, and the largest on the Eastern Seaboard. The Port Authority also operates six bi-state crossings: three connecting New Jersey with Manhattan, and three connecting New Jersey with Staten Island. The Port Authority Bus Terminal and the PATH rail system are also run by the Port Authority, as well as John F. Kennedy International Airport, LaGuardia Airport, and Newark Liberty International Airport, Teterboro Airport, and Stewart International Airport. The agency has its own 2,100-member Port Authority Police Department.

== History ==
Port Authority logo from 2003 to 2020

The Port of New York and New Jersey comprised the main point of embarkation for U.S. troops and supplies sent to Europe during World War I, via the New York Port of Embarkation. The congestion at the port led experts to realize the need for a port authority to supervise the extremely complex system of bridges, highways, subways, and port facilities in the New York-New Jersey area. The solution was the 1921 creation of the Port Authority under the supervision of the governors of the two states. By issuing its own bonds, it was financially independent of either state; the bonds were paid off from tolls and fees, not from taxes. It became one of the major agencies of the metropolitan area for large-scale projects. Early bond issues were tied to specific projects, but this changed in 1935 when the Authority issued General and Refunding bonds with a claim on its general revenues.

=== Previous disputes ===
In the early years of the 20th century, there were disputes between the states of New Jersey and New York over rail freights and boundaries. At the time, rail lines terminated on the New Jersey side of the harbor, while ocean shipping was centered on Manhattan and Brooklyn. Freight had to be shipped across the Hudson River in barges. In 1916, New Jersey launched a lawsuit against New York over issues of rail freight, with the Interstate Commerce Commission (ICC) issuing an order that the two states work together, subordinating their own interests to the public interest. The Harbor Development Commission, a joint advisory board set-up in 1917, recommended that a bi-state authority be established to oversee efficient economic development of the port district. The Port of New York Authority was established on April 30, 1921, through an interstate compact between the states of New Jersey and New York. This was the first such agency in the United States, created under a provision in the Constitution of the United States permitting interstate compacts. The idea for the Port Authority was conceived during the Progressive Era, which aimed at the reduction of political corruption and at increasing the efficiency of government. With the Port Authority at a distance from political pressures, it was able to carry longer-term infrastructure projects irrespective of the election cycles and in a more efficient manner. The Port of New York Authority was officially renamed the Port Authority of New York and New Jersey to better reflect its status as a partnership between the two states, taking effect on July 1, 1972.

Throughout its history, there have been concerns about democratic accountability, or lack thereof at the Port Authority. The Port District is irregularly shaped but comprises a 1,500-square-mile (3,900 km^{2}) area roughly within a 25-mile (40 km) radius of the Statue of Liberty.

=== Interstate crossings ===
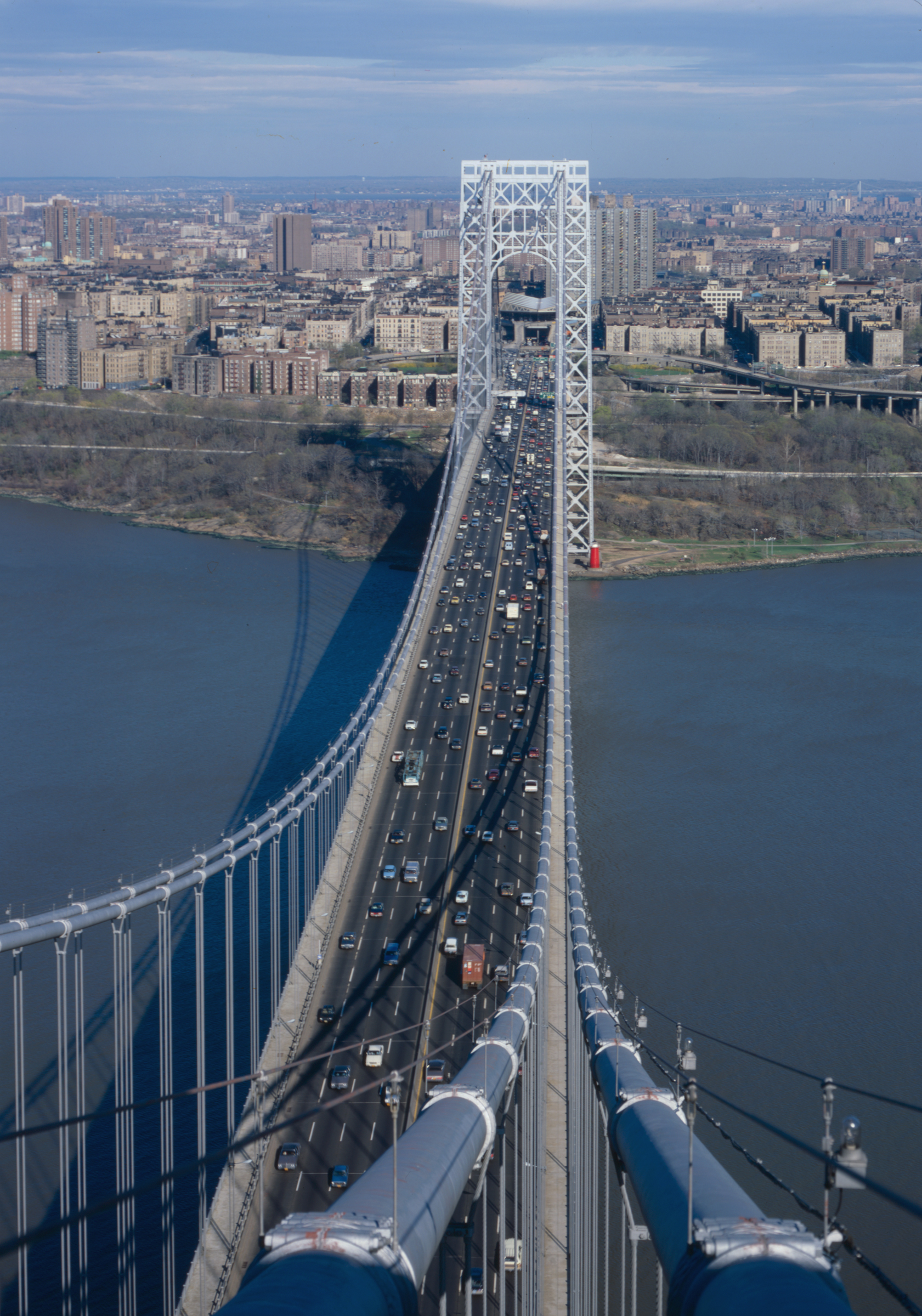
George Washington Bridge

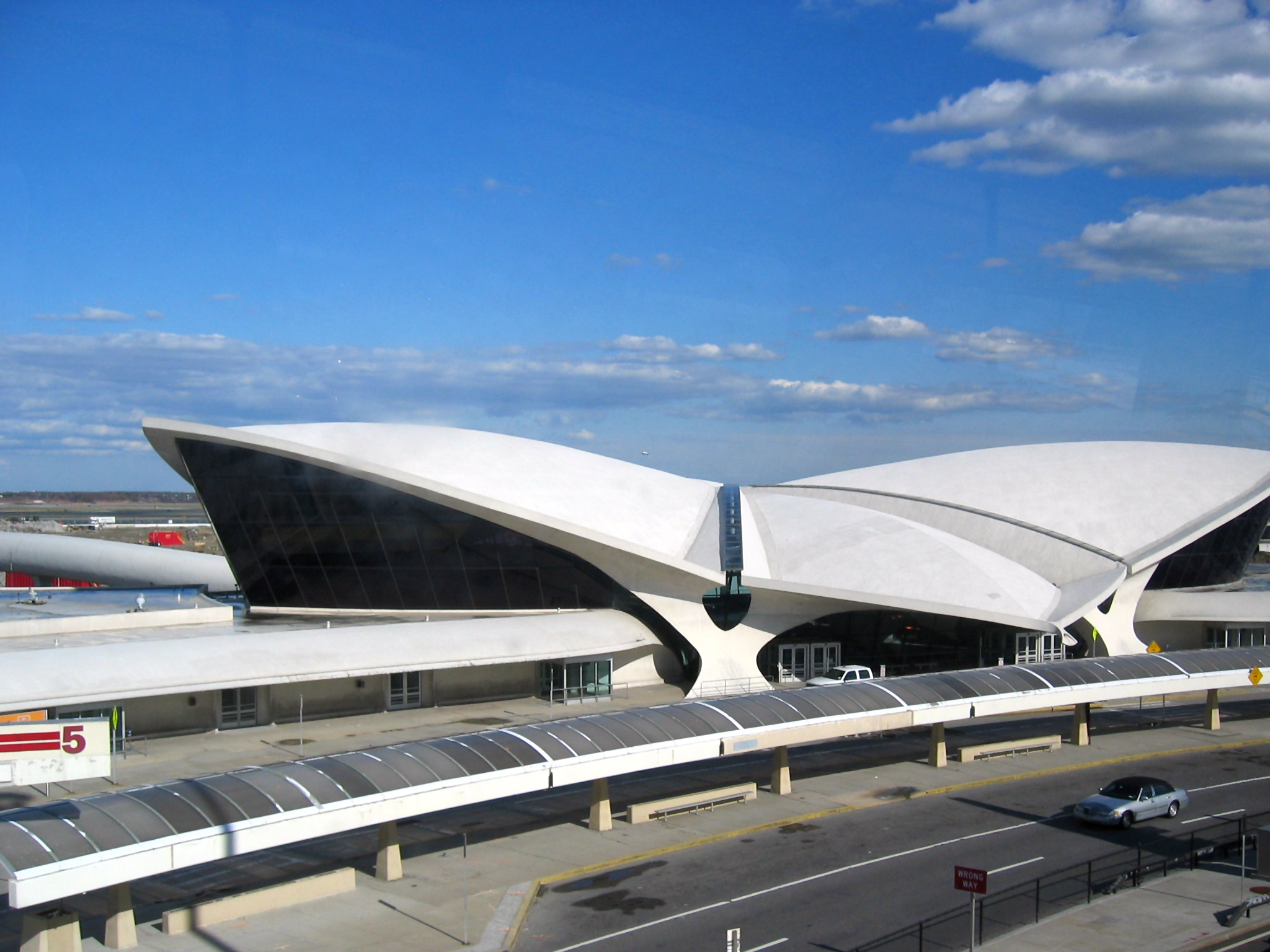
TWA Flight Center at John F. Kennedy International Airport

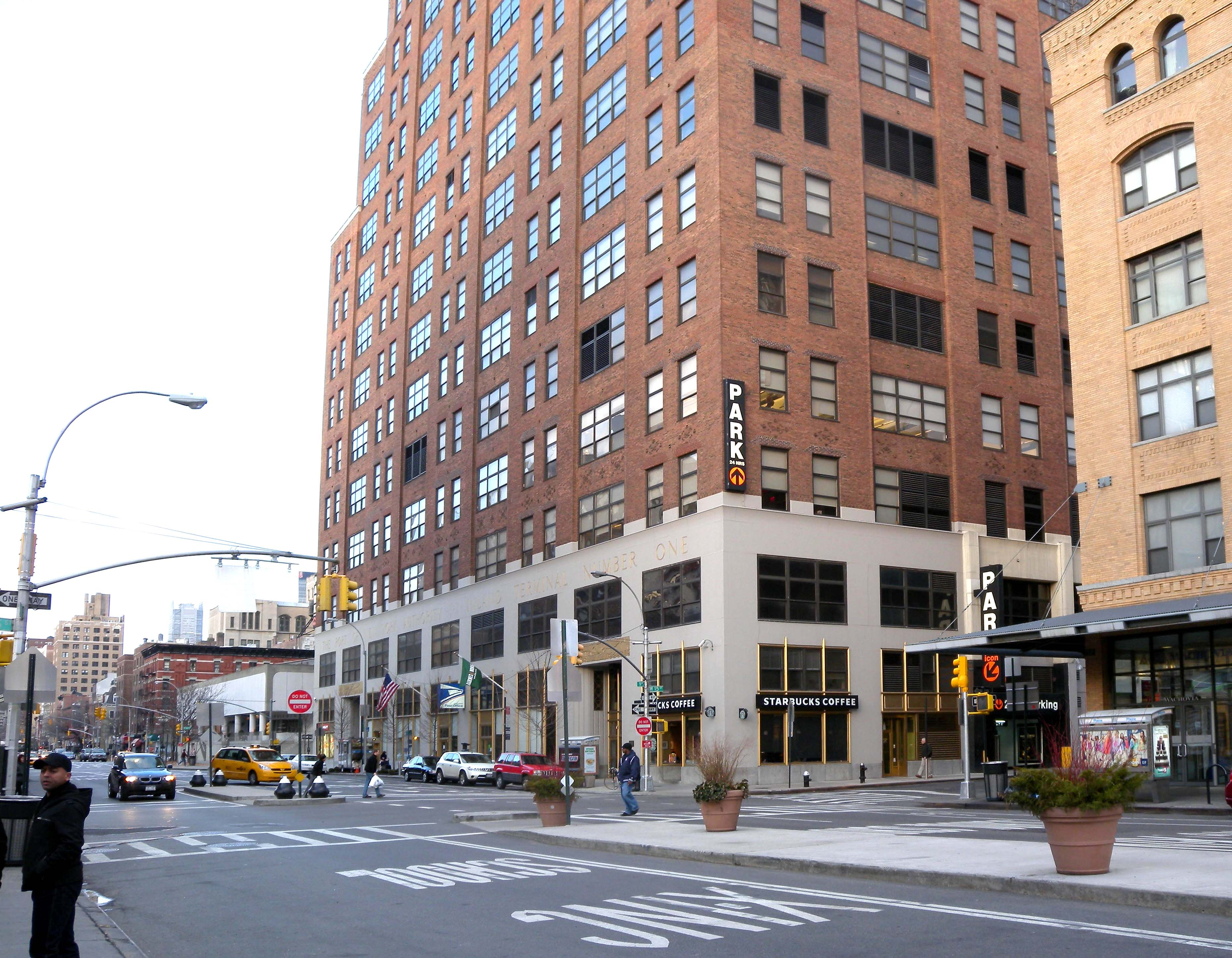
111 Eighth Avenue, formerly the Inland Terminal Number One, in Manhattan (now owned by Google)

At the beginning of the 20th century, there were no road bridge or tunnel crossings between the two states. The initial tunnel crossings were completed privately by the Hudson and Manhattan Railroad in 1908 and 1909 ("Hudson Tubes"), followed by the Pennsylvania Railroad in 1910 ("North River Tunnels"). Under an independent agency, the Holland Tunnel was opened in 1927, with some planning and construction pre-dating the Port Authority. With the rise in automobile traffic, there was demand for more Hudson River crossings. Using its ability to issue bonds and collect revenue, the Port Authority has built and managed major infrastructure projects. Early projects included bridges across the Arthur Kill, which separates Staten Island from New Jersey. The Goethals Bridge, named after chief engineer of the Panama Canal Commission General George Washington Goethals, connected Elizabeth, New Jersey and Howland Hook, Staten Island. At the south end of Arthur Kill, the Outerbridge Crossing was built and named after the Port Authority's first chairman, Eugenius Harvey Outerbridge. Construction of both bridges was completed in 1928. The Bayonne Bridge, opened in 1931, was built across the Kill van Kull, connecting Staten Island with Bayonne, New Jersey.

Construction began in 1927 on the George Washington Bridge, linking the northern part of Manhattan with Fort Lee, New Jersey, with Port Authority chief engineer, Othmar Ammann, overseeing the project. The bridge was completed in October 1931, ahead of schedule and well under the estimated costs. This efficiency exhibited by the Port Authority impressed President Franklin D. Roosevelt, who used this as a model in creating the Tennessee Valley Authority and other such entities.

In 1930, the Holland Tunnel was placed under the control of the Port Authority, providing significant toll revenues. The Port Authority also controlled the Lincoln Tunnel, connecting New Jersey and Midtown Manhattan. The Lincoln Tunnel opened in 1937 as a single-tube tunnel; a second tube opened in 1945, and a third tube opened in 1957.

In 1962, the Port Authority absorbed the bankrupt Hudson & Manhattan Railroad and reorganized it as Port Authority Trans-Hudson (PATH). As part of the deal, the Port Authority acquired the rights to build the original World Trade Center on the site of the old Hudson Terminal, one of two terminals in Manhattan for H&M/PATH.

=== Austin J. Tobin era ===
==== Airport expansion ====
In 1942, Austin J. Tobin became the executive director of the Port Authority. In the post-World War II period, the Port Authority expanded its operations to include airports, and marine terminals, with projects including Newark Liberty International Airport and Port Newark-Elizabeth Marine Terminals. Meanwhile, the city-owned La Guardia Field was nearing capacity in 1939 and needed expensive upgrades and expansion. At the time, airports were operated as loss leaders, and the city was having difficulties maintaining the status quo, losing money and unable to undertake needed expansions. The city was looking to hand the airports over to a public authority, possibly to Robert Moses' Triborough Bridge and Tunnel Authority. After long negotiations with the City of New York, a 50-year lease, commencing on May 31, 1947, went to the Port Authority of New York to rehabilitate, develop, and operate La Guardia Airport (La Guardia Field), John F. Kennedy International Airport (Idlewild Airport), and Floyd Bennett Field. The Port Authority transformed the airports into fee-generating facilities, adding stores and restaurants.

==== World Trade Center ====
David Rockefeller, president of Chase Manhattan Bank, envisioned a World Trade Center for lower Manhattan. Realizing that he needed public funding in order to construct the massive project, he approached Tobin. Although many questioned the Port Authority's entry into the real estate market, Tobin saw the project as a way to enhance the agency's power and prestige, and agreed to the project. The Port Authority was the overseer of the World Trade Center, hiring the architect Minoru Yamasaki and engineer Leslie Robertson.

Yamasaki ultimately settled on the idea of twin towers. To meet the Port Authority's requirement to build 10 million square feet (930,000 m^{2}) of office space, the towers would each be 110 stories tall. The size of the project raised ire from the owner of the Empire State Building, which would lose its title of tallest building in the world. Other critics objected to the idea of this much "subsidized" office space going on the open market, competing with the private sector. Others questioned the cost of the project, which in 1966 had risen to $575 million. Final negotiations between The City of New York and the Port Authority centered on tax issues. A final agreement was made that the Port Authority would make annual payments in lieu of taxes, for the 40% of the World Trade Center leased to private tenants. The remaining space was to be occupied by state and federal government agencies. In 1962, the Port Authority signed the United States Customs Service as a tenant, and in 1964 they signed a deal with the State of New York to locate government offices at the World Trade Center.

In August 1968, construction on the World Trade Center's north tower started, with construction on the south tower beginning in January 1969. When the World Trade Center twin towers were completed, the total cost to the Port Authority had reached $900 million. The buildings were dedicated on April 4, 1973, with Tobin, who had retired the year before, absent from the ceremonies.

In 1986, the Port Authority sold rights to the World Trade Center name for $10 to an organization run by an outgoing executive, Guy F. Tozzoli. He in turn made millions of dollars selling the use of the name in up to 28 different states.

After the 1993 World Trade Center bombing, the Port Authority was sued by survivors of the attack for negligence in not making security upgrades to known flaws that could have prevented the attack. The Port Authority was ruled to be negligent.

=== September 11 attacks ===
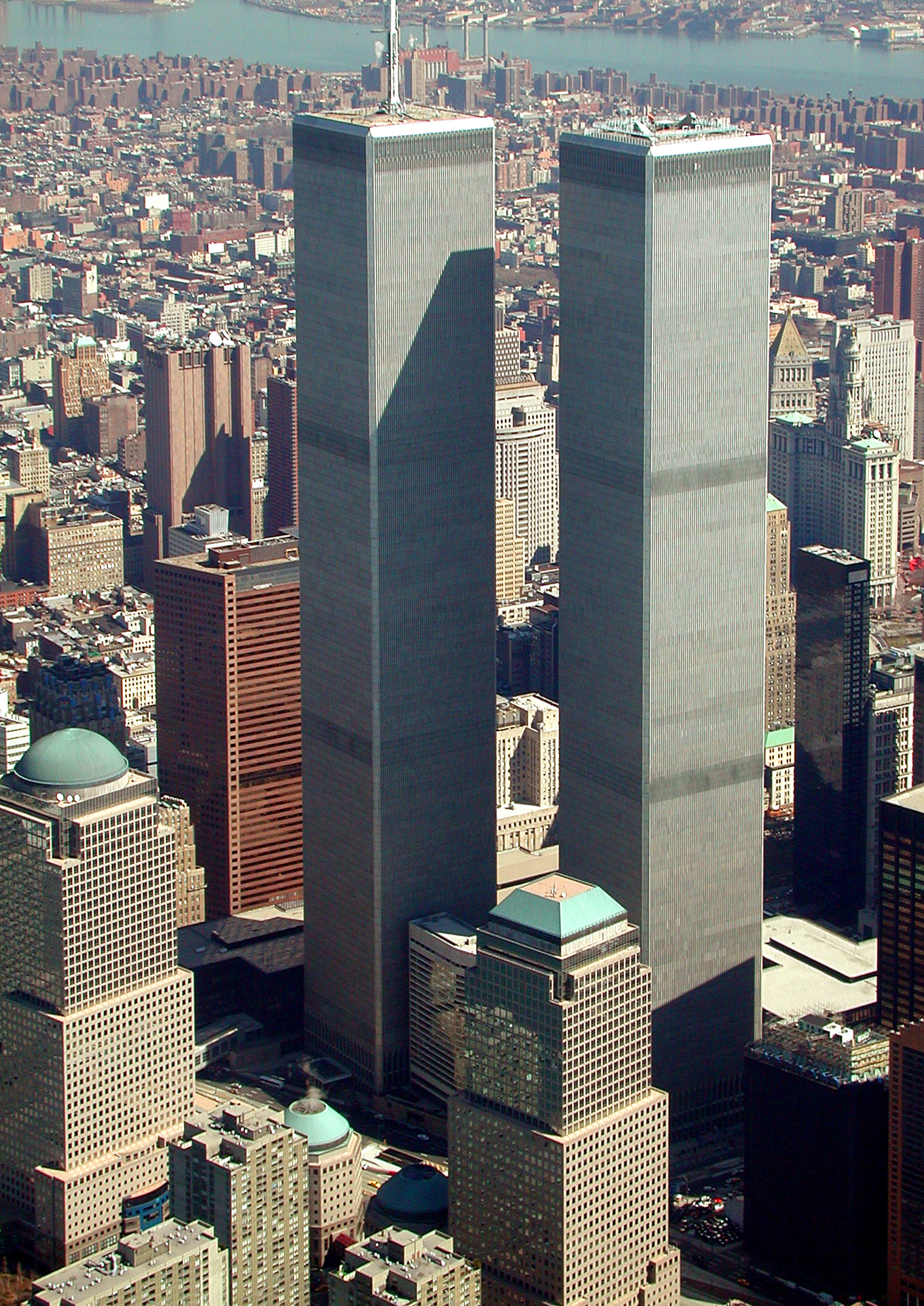
The PANYNJ had its headquarters in 1 World Trade Center (North Tower) (left)

The terrorist attacks of September 11, 2001, and the subsequent collapse of the World Trade Center buildings impacted the Port Authority. With the Port Authority's headquarters located in 1 World Trade Center, it became deprived of a base of operations and sustained a great number of casualties. An estimated 1,400 Port Authority employees worked in the World Trade Center. Eighty-four employees, including 37 Port Authority police officers, its executive director, Neil D. Levin, and police superintendent, Fred V. Morrone, died. In rescue efforts following the collapse, two Port Authority police officers, John McLoughlin and Will Jimeno, were pulled out alive after spending nearly 24 hours beneath 30 feet (9.1 m) of rubble. Their rescue was later portrayed in the 2006 Oliver Stone film World Trade Center. Future Executive Director Christopher O. Ward was at the World Trade Center on 9/11, and is a survivor of the attack. Ward was Chief of External Affairs & Director of Port Development under Neil Levin at the time. As the executive director from 2008 to 2011, he is credited with turning around Ground Zero construction and having the memorial ready for the 10th anniversary. A former attorney for the PANYNJ who worked on 9/11 related issues is now on the federal bench, Angel Kelley.

=== Fort Lee lane closure scandal ===
The Fort Lee lane closure scandal was a US political scandal that concerns New Jersey Governor Chris Christie's staff and his Port Authority political appointees conspiring to create a traffic jam in Fort Lee, New Jersey as political retribution, and their attempts to cover up these actions and suppress internal and public disclosures. Dedicated toll lanes for one of the Fort Lee entrances (used by local traffic from Fort Lee and surrounding communities) to the upper level on the George Washington Bridge, which connects to Manhattan, were reduced from three to one from September 9–13, 2013. The toll lane closures caused massive Fort Lee traffic back-ups, which affected public safety due to extensive delays by police and emergency service providers and disrupted schools due to the delayed arrivals of students and teachers. Two Port Authority officials (who were appointed by Christie and would later resign) claimed that reallocating two of the toll lanes from the local Fort Lee entrance to the major highways was due to a traffic study evaluating "traffic safety patterns" at the bridge, but the executive director of the Port Authority was unaware of a traffic study.

As of March 2014, the repercussions and controversy surrounding these actions continue to be under investigation by the Port Authority, federal prosecutors, and a New Jersey legislature committee. The Port Authority's chairman, David Samson, who was appointed by Governor Christie, resigned on March 28, 2014, amid allegations of his involvement in the scandal and other controversies.

=== Caren Turner scandal ===
In April 2018, Caren Turner resigned from the Board of Commissioners after an ethics investigation revealed that her attempt to intervene in a traffic stop for her daughter included what the Port Authority described as "profoundly disturbing" conduct. New Jersey police released a videotape of her attempting to leverage her position at the Port Authority to intimidate police officers, following a routine traffic stop of a vehicle in which her adult daughter was a passenger. Her case was referred to New Jersey's Ethics Commission.

=== Ownership swap of Brooklyn Marine and Howland Hook terminals ===
In May 2024, the Authority transferred ownership of the Brooklyn Marine Terminal and Red Hook Container Terminal to the City of New York in exchange for ownership of the Howland Hook Marine Terminal on Staten Island.

== Governance ==
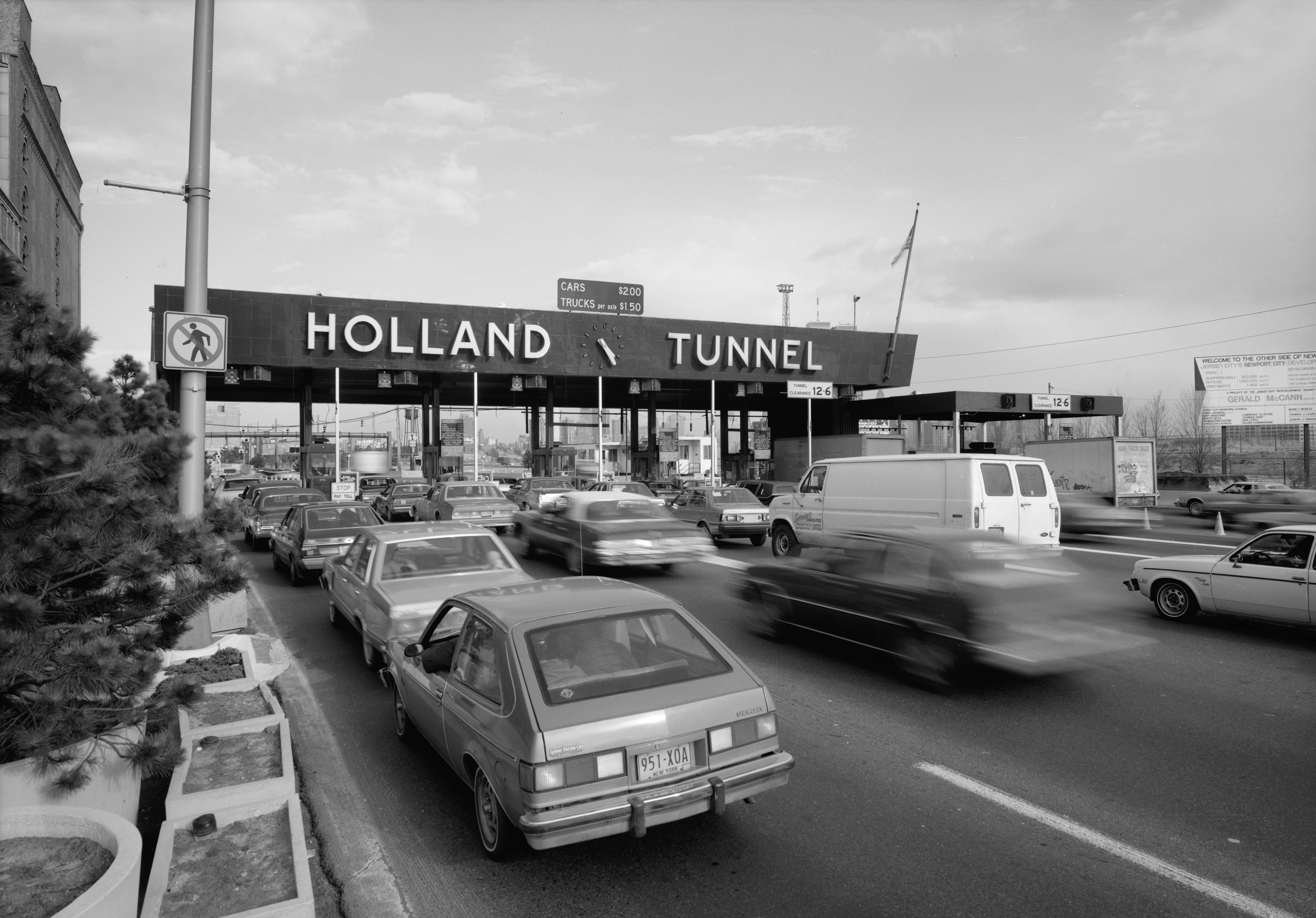
Tolls collected at the Holland Tunnel and other crossings help fund the Port Authority

The Port Authority is jointly controlled by the governors of New York and New Jersey, who appoint the members of the agency's Board of Commissioners and retain the right to veto the actions of the commissioners from their own state. Each governor appoints six members to the Board of Commissioners, who are subject to state senate confirmation and serve overlapping six-year terms without pay. An executive director is appointed by the board of commissioners to deal with day-to-day operations and to execute the Port Authority's policies. Under an informal power-sharing agreement, the governor of New Jersey chooses the chairman of the board and the deputy executive director, while the governor of New York selects the vice chairman and executive director.

The Port Authority is headquartered at 4 World Trade Center in Lower Manhattan. The agency was headquartered at 1 World Trade Center in the first World Trade Center complex, where it occupied 22,411 square feet (2,082.1 m^{2}) of space. It had been headquartered in the WTC complex beginning in 1973. After the previous headquarters were destroyed in the September 11, 2001 attacks, the Port Authority moved into 225 Park Avenue South in Midtown Manhattan, with employees divided between offices in New York and New Jersey, before returning to the World Trade Center in 2015.

Financially, the Port Authority has no power to tax and does not receive tax money from any local or state governments. Instead, it operates on the revenues it makes from its rents, tolls, fees, and facilities.

=== Board of Commissioners ===
Meetings of the Board of Commissioners are public. Members of the public may address the Board at these meetings, subject to a prior registration process via email. Public records of the Port Authority may be requested via the Office of the Secretary according to an internal Freedom of Information policy which is intended to be consistent with and similar to the state Freedom of Information policies of both New York and New Jersey.

Members of the Board of Commissioners are typically business titans and political power brokers who maintain close relationships with their respective governors. On February 3, 2011, former New Jersey Attorney General David Samson was named the new chairman of the Port Authority by New Jersey Governor Chris Christie. Gov. Christie announced Samson's resignation in March 2016, a casualty of investigations into the "Bridgegate" scandal. Basil Paterson, father of former Governor David Paterson, served on the board from 1989 to 1995, and again from 2013 to 2014.

The current commissioners are:

| Name | State | First appointed | First appointed by |
|---|---|---|---|
| Jeffrey H. Lynford (Vice Chairman) | NY | June 2011 | Andrew Cuomo |
| Gary LaBarbera | NY | June 30, 2017 | Andrew Cuomo |
| Rossana Rosado | NY | July 2, 2017 | Andrew Cuomo |
| Winston Fisher | NY | June 10, 2023 | Kathy Hochul |
| Leecia Eve | NY | July 12, 2017 | Andrew Cuomo |
| Elizabeth Fine | NY | June 6, 2024 | Kathy Hochul |
| Kevin J. O'Toole (chairman) | NJ | July 2, 2017 | Chris Christie |
| Kevin P. McCabe | NJ | December 19, 2017 | Chris Christie |
| Michelle Richardson | NJ | June 8, 2021 | Phil Murphy |
| J. Christian Bollwage | NJ | February 27, 2023 | Phil Murphy |
| George Helmy | NJ | February 27, 2023 | Phil Murphy |
| Joseph Kelley | NJ | February 27, 2023 | Phil Murphy |

=== Executive Directors ===
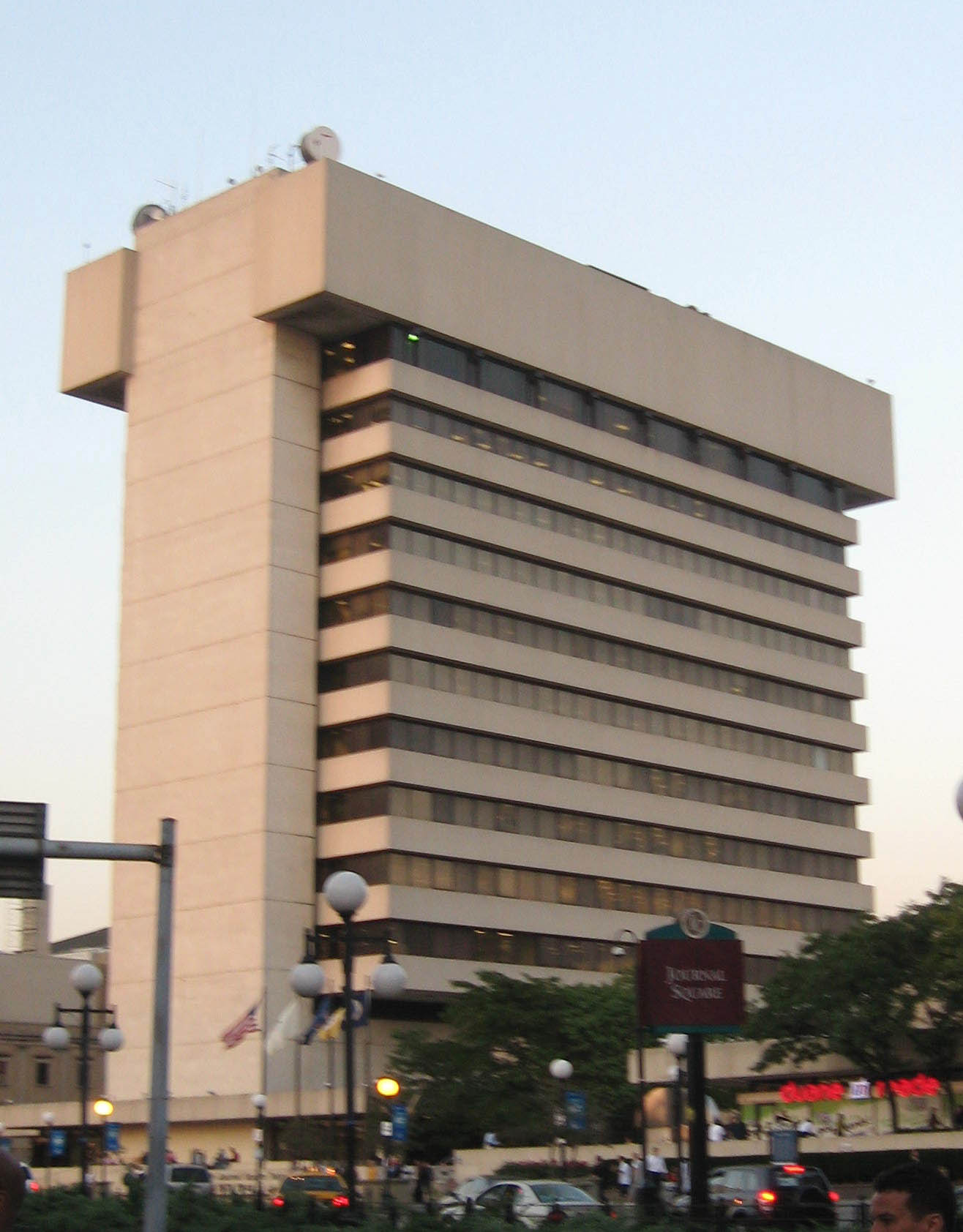
Journal Square Transportation Center in Jersey City, New Jersey

| Name | Tenure | Appointed by |
Port of New York Authority
| John E. Ramsey | 1926–1930 (as Chief Executive Officer); 1930–1942 (as General Manager) | Al Smith |
| Austin J. Tobin | 1942 – 1946 (as General Manager); 1946–1972 | Charles Poletti |
Port Authority of New York and New Jersey
| Matthias Lukens | 1972–1973 (acting) | Nelson Rockefeller |
| A. Gerdes Kuhbach | 1973 – August 1974 (acting); August 1974 – 1977 | Malcolm Wilson |
| Peter C. Goldmark, Jr. | 1977–1985 | Hugh Carey |
| Patrick J. Falvey | 1985 (acting) | Mario Cuomo |
| Stephen Berger | 1986–1990 | Mario Cuomo |
| Stanley Brezenoff | 1990–1995 | Mario Cuomo |
| George Marlin | 1995–1997 | George Pataki |
| Robert E. Boyle | 1997–2001 | George Pataki |
| Neil D. Levin | March 2001 – September 11, 2001 | George Pataki |
| Ronald H. Shiftan | September 11, 2001 – December 31, 2001 | George Pataki |
| Joseph J. Seymour | January 1, 2002 – October 2004 | George Pataki |
| Kenneth J. Ringler, Jr. | October 2004 – December 31, 2006 | George Pataki |
| Anthony Shorris | January 1, 2007 – April 24, 2008 | Eliot Spitzer |
| Christopher O. Ward | May 1, 2008 – November 1, 2011 | David Paterson |
| Patrick J. Foye | November 1, 2011 – August 13, 2017 | Andrew Cuomo |
| Rick Cotton | August 14, 2017 – January 2026 | Andrew Cuomo |
| Kathryn Garcia | February 5, 2026 – present | Kathy Hochul |

=== Chairs ===
- Eugenius Harvey Outerbridge, 1921–1924
- Julian Gregory, 1924–1926
- George Sebastian Silzer, 1926–1928
- John F. Galvin, 1928–1933
- Frank C. Ferguson, 1934–1945
- Howard S. Cullman, 1945–1955
- Donald V. Lowe, 1955–1959
- S. Sloan Colt, 1959–1968
- James C. Kellogg III, 1968–1974
- William Ronan, 1974–1977
- Alan Sagner, 1977–1985
- Philip D. Kaltenbacher, 1985–1990
- Richard Leone, 1990–1994
- Kathleen Donovan, 1994–1995
- Lewis Eisenberg, 1995–2001
- Jack Sinagra, 2001–2003
- Anthony R. Coscia, 2003–2011
- David Samson, 2011–2014
- John J. Degnan, 2014–2017
- Kevin J. O'Toole, 2017–present

== Facilities ==
In 2004, the Port Authority handled the third largest amount of American shipping in total tonnage, with only Houston and South Louisiana handling more. In 2020, it was overtaken by the Port of Corpus Christi.

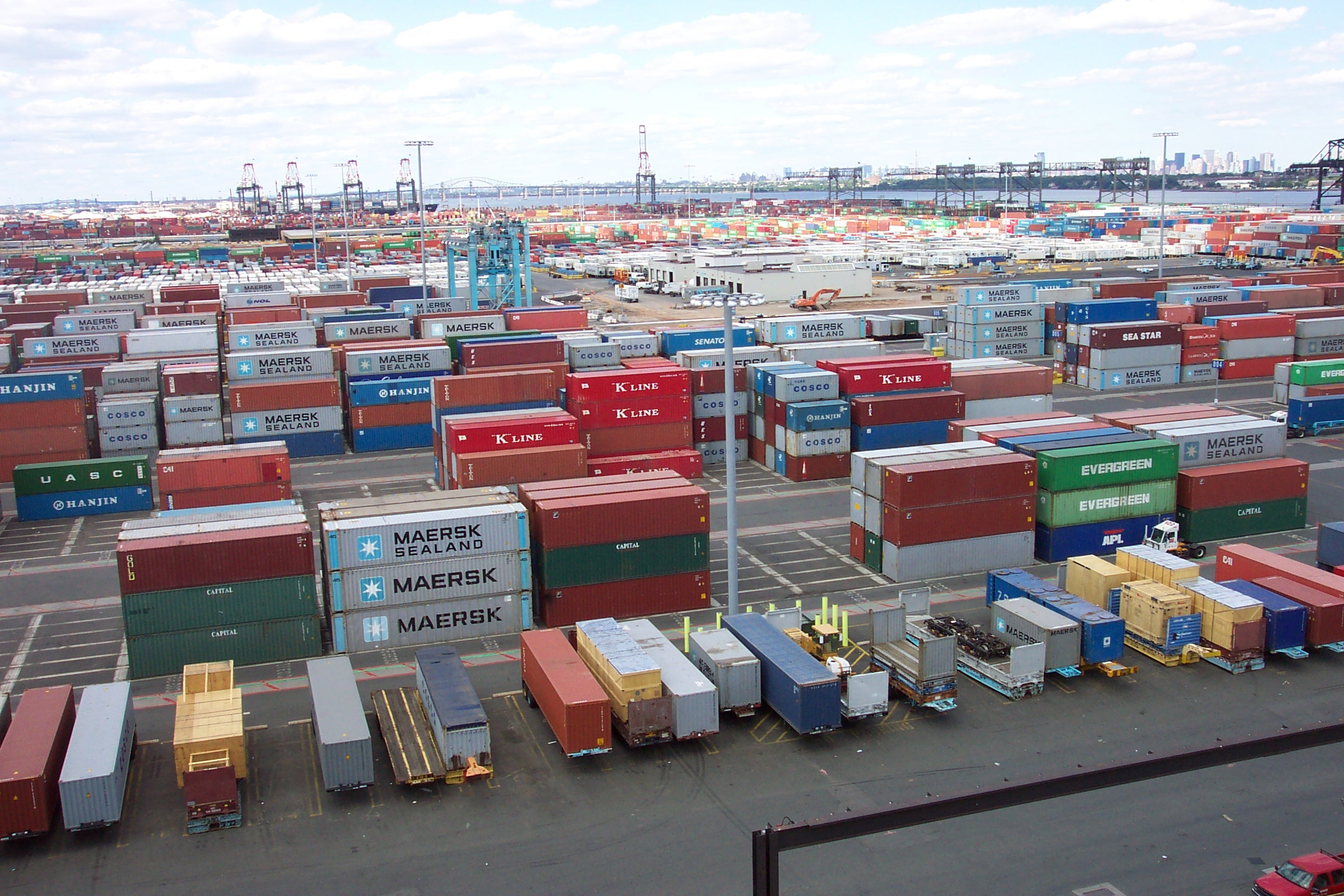
Part of the A.P. Moller Container terminal at Port Elizabeth

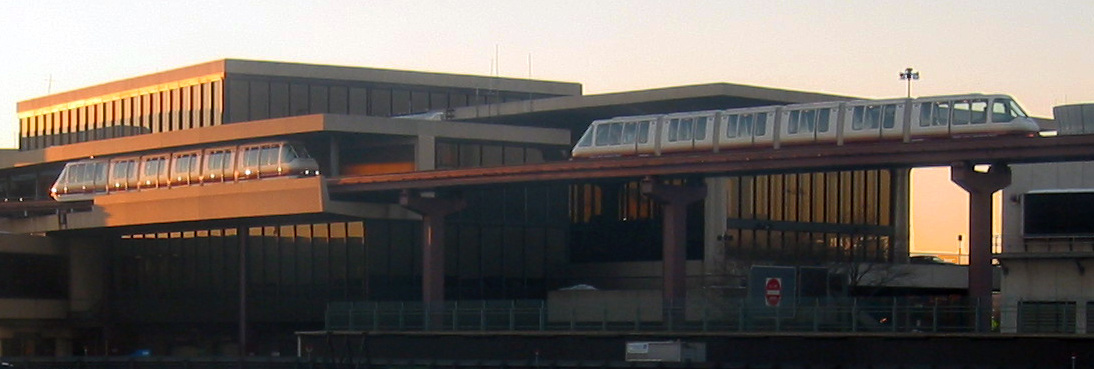
AirTrain Newark at Newark Liberty International Airport

The Port Authority of New York and New Jersey manages and maintains infrastructure critical to the New York/New Jersey region's trade and transportation network—five of the region's airports, the New York/New Jersey seaport, the PATH rail transit system, six tunnels and bridges between New York and New Jersey, the Port Authority Bus Terminal and George Washington Bridge Bus Station in Manhattan and The World Trade Center site. Detailed statistics on facilities usage are available in their annual reports.

=== Seaports ===
The Port of New York and New Jersey is the largest port complex on the East Coast of North America. In 2021, Port Authority seaports handled the fourth largest amount of shipping among U.S. ports, measured in total tonnage. As of August 2022, the Port Authority led the country when considering only containers and not bulk materials such as petroleum and grain.

The Port Authority operates the following seaports:

- Port Jersey Marine Terminal in Bayonne and Jersey City
- Howland Hook Marine Terminal on Staten Island
- Port Newark-Elizabeth Marine Terminal in Newark and Elizabeth, the first in the nation to containerize.

The Port Authority operates the ExpressRail rail services within the seaport area, including dockside trackage and railyards for transloading. It interchanges with Conrail Shared Assets Operations (CRCX) on the Chemical Coast Secondary, Norfolk Southern (NS), CSX Transportation (CSX), and Canadian Pacific (CP). From January through October 2014 the system handled 391,596 rail lifts. As of 2014, three ExpressRail systems (Elizabeth, Newark, Staten Island) were in operation with the construction of a fourth at Port Jersey underway.

The Port Authority has operated New York New Jersey Rail, LLC (NYNJ), since its acquisition in 1962. It serves as a switching and terminal railroad operating a car float operation across Upper New York Bay between the Greenville Yard in Jersey City and Brooklyn.

=== Airports ===
The Port Authority operates the following airports:

- John F. Kennedy International Airport (Queens, New York)
- LaGuardia Airport (Queens, New York)
- Newark Liberty International Airport (Newark and Elizabeth, New Jersey)
- Stewart International Airport, (Newburgh, New York)
- Teterboro Airport (Teterboro, New Jersey)

Both Kennedy and LaGuardia airports are owned by the City of New York and leased to the Port Authority for operating purposes. Newark Liberty is owned by the cities of Elizabeth and Newark and is also leased to the Authority. In 2007, Stewart International Airport, owned by the State of New York, was leased to the Port Authority.

JFK, LaGuardia, and Newark Liberty as a whole form the largest airport system in the United States, second in the world in terms of passenger traffic, and first in the world by total flight operations, with JFK being the 19th busiest in the world and the 6th busiest in the U.S.

=== Heliports ===
The Authority operated the Downtown Manhattan Heliport (Manhattan, New York) until the lease expired in August 2007 but continued to operate it until the next lessee took over. The Authority had operated the other heliports in Manhattan but gave up leases for all of them over the years.

=== Bridges and tunnels ===
The Port Authority manages every crossing between New York City and New Jersey, which include the George Washington Bridge, the Lincoln Tunnel, and the Holland Tunnel, which all connect Manhattan and Northern New Jersey, as well as the Goethals Bridge, the Bayonne Bridge, and the Outerbridge Crossing, which connect Staten Island and New Jersey. They also maintain many entrances approaches to these crossings, such as the GWB Plaza and Lincoln Tunnel Helix.

=== Bus and rail transit ===
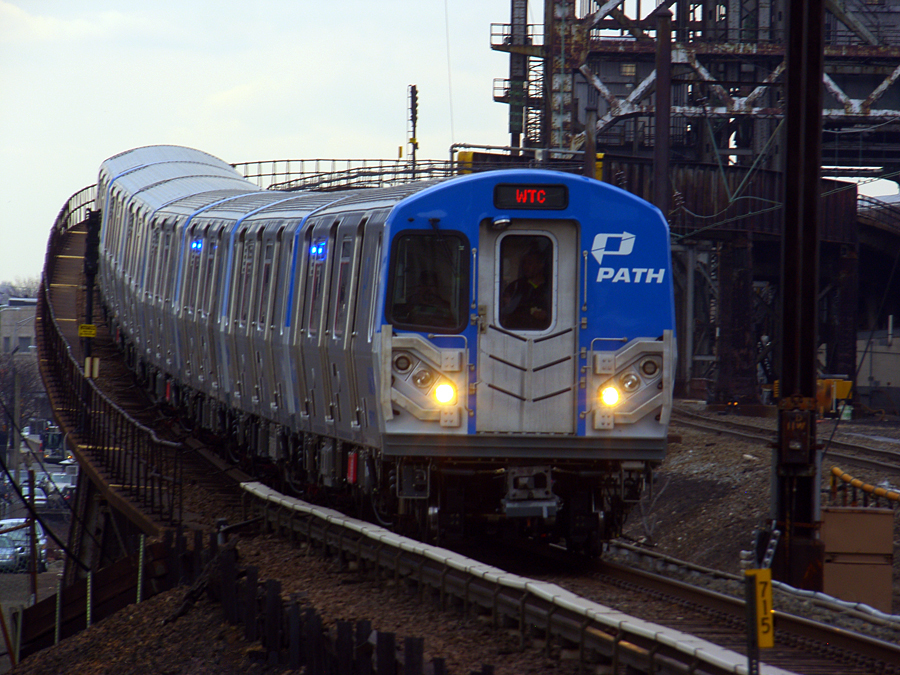
A PATH train bound for World Trade Center station

The Port Authority operates the PATH rapid transit system linking lower and midtown Manhattan with New Jersey, the AirTrain Newark system linking Newark International Airport with NJ Transit and Amtrak via a station on the Northeast Corridor rail line, and the AirTrain JFK system linking JFK with the Howard Beach subway station and the Jamaica subway and Long Island Rail Road stations.

Major bus depots include the Port Authority Bus Terminal at 42nd Street, the George Washington Bridge Bus Station, and the Journal Square Transportation Center in Jersey City.

The PANYNJ is a major stakeholder in the Gateway Program. The program will upgrade the Northeast Corridor by building two new tunnels under the Hudson River paralleling the existing North River Tunnels, as well as connecting infrastructure.

The Port Authority also owns and operates a network of shuttle buses on its airport properties. As of 2017, the agency operates 23 Orion buses at Newark Airport, 7 at LaGuardia Airport, and 40 at JFK Airport, all purchased in 2007 and 2009.

=== Real estate ===
The Port Authority also participates in joint development ventures around the region, including the Teleport business park on Staten Island, Bathgate Industrial Park in the Bronx, the Industrial Park at Elizabeth, the Essex County Resource Recovery Facility, Newark Legal Center, Queens West in Long Island City, and the South Waterfront in Hoboken. However, by April 2015, the agency was considering divesting itself of the properties to raise revenue and return to the core mission of supporting transportation infrastructure.

The Port Authority has always owned the 16-acre World Trade Center land, both the old WTC and the new WTC. However, some of the office space on the old complex and in the new one have been leased, managed, or built by Silverstein Properties, notably 3 World Trade Center (2018) and 7 World Trade Center (1987 and 2006 respectively).

=== Current and future projects ===
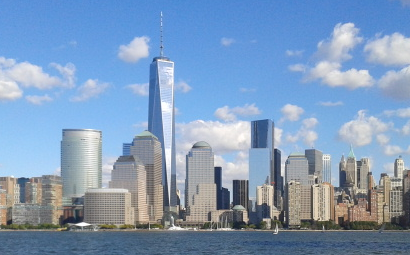
The newly constructed World Trade Center in 2013

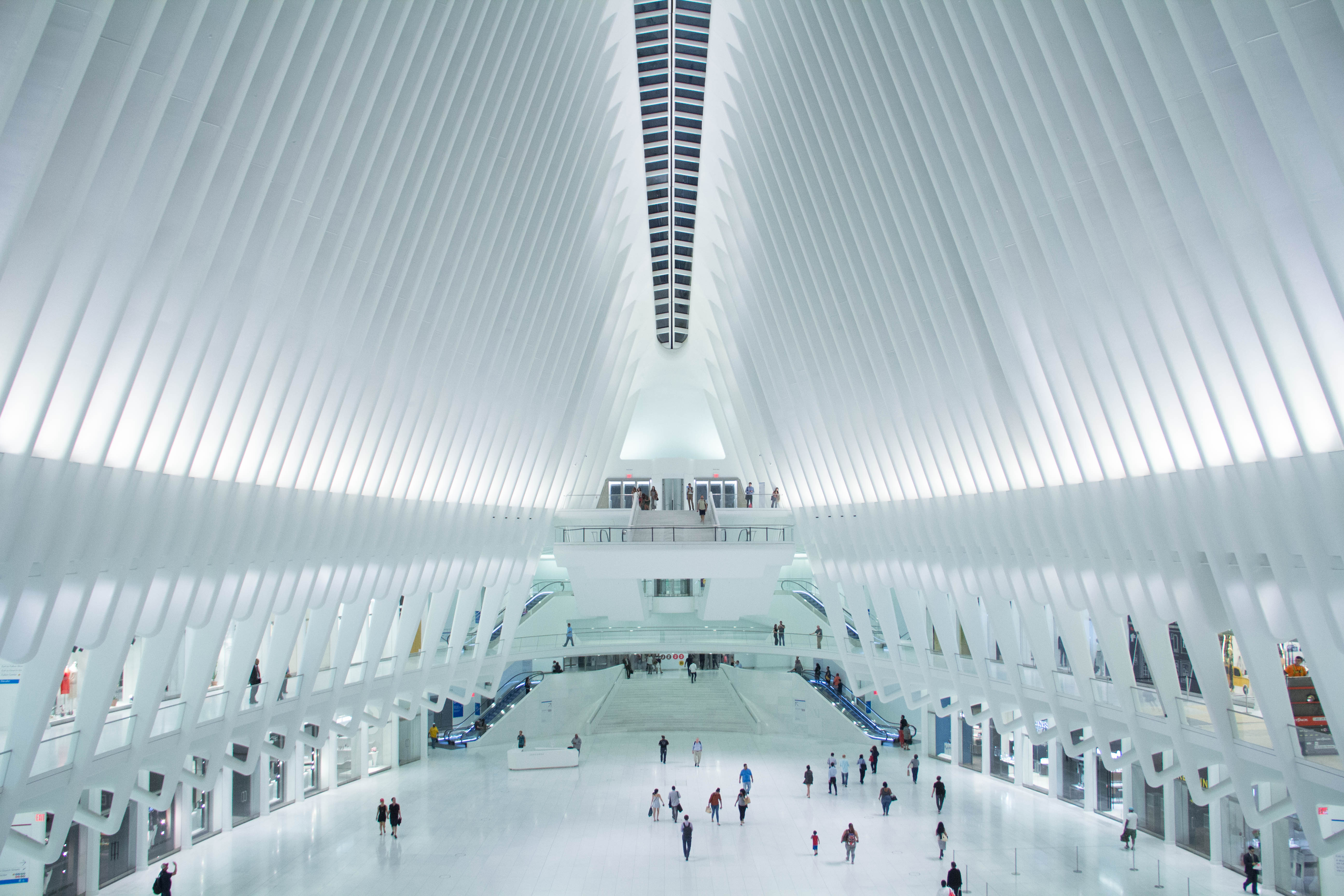
Inside the World Trade Center Transportation Hub

==== World Trade Center ====
Major projects by the Port Authority include One World Trade Center and other construction at the World Trade Center complex. Other projects include a new passenger terminal at JFK International Airport, and redevelopment of Newark Liberty International Airport's Terminal B, and replacement of the Goethals Bridge. The Port Authority also has plans to buy 340 new PATH cars and begin major expansion of Stewart International Airport.

As owner of the World Trade Center complex, the Port Authority has worked since 2001 on plans for reconstruction of the site, along with Silverstein Properties, and the Lower Manhattan Development Corporation. In 2006, the Port Authority reached a deal with Larry Silverstein, which ceded control of One World Trade Center to the Port Authority. The deal gave Silverstein rights to build three towers along the eastern side of the site, including 150 Greenwich Street, 175 Greenwich Street, and 200 Greenwich Street. Also part of the plans was the World Trade Center Transportation Hub, which opened in March 2016 and replaced the temporary PATH station that opened in November 2003.

==== Airports ====
The Port Authority began construction of a new terminal at Newark Airport in June 2017. The new facility will replace Terminal A and will open in 2022. The PATH's Newark–World Trade Center train route is planned to be extended from its terminus at Newark Penn Station to a new Newark Liberty International Airport Station. The PANYNJ announced in March 2023 that it was deferring funding for the Newark Airport extension to a future capital plan.

Another Port Authority project involves redeveloping LaGuardia Airport, replacing three existing terminals with a single terminal. Terminal B would be demolished and terminals C and D would be merged. Some 2 miles (3.2 km) of additional taxiways are to be built, and transportation around the terminals would be reorganized. The redevelopment is expected to cost $7.6 billion in total. Construction started in 2016, and the first part of the new terminal opened in 2021, with completion in 2026. As part of the reconstruction, the AirTrain LGA people mover system was to have been built between the airport and Willets Point, Queens. The AirTrain was supposed to start construction in 2020 and be completed by 2022, but the project was canceled in March 2023 after several years of delays.

The Port Authority is also planning to redevelop the entirety of John F. Kennedy International Airport, replacing four existing terminals with two new terminals at a cost of $11 billion. Roadway access, as well as train capacity on the AirTrain JFK, would be expanded. Under the plan, the first gates would open in 2023, and the project would be complete in 2025. Work on a new Terminal 1 began in 2022, and work on Terminal 6 began in early 2023. In addition, Terminal 4 was expanded.

== Law enforcement ==
The Port Authority has its own police department. In 2001, the department employed approximately 4,000 police officers and supervisors who had full police status in the states of New York and New Jersey.

== See also ==
- 111 Eighth Avenue, formerly known as the Commerce Building of the Port Authority of New York and New Jersey
- List of ports in the United States
- Transportation in New York City
- New York City Office of Administrative Trials and Hearings (OATH), for hearings conducted on summonses for NYC Taxi and Limousine Commission rules and regulations violations
- Port authority
- Waterfront Commission of New York Harbor
