= Honour (style) =

Address of judges

His Honour or Her Honour (American English: His Honor or Her Honor) is an honorific prefix traditionally applied to certain classes of people, in particular justices and judges and mayors. In Australia and the United States, the prefix is also used for magistrates (spelled in the American style, "Honor"). A corruption of the term, "Hizzoner", is sometimes used to irreverently refer to mayors of larger U.S. cities such as New York, Los Angeles, Chicago, or Philadelphia.

In Australia, His Honour or Her Honour is used as a title for the Administrator of the Northern Territory while in office. The Honourable is a courtesy title retained for life for a former administrator.

In England and Wales, it is used as a prefix for circuit judges, e.g. Her Honour Judge Jane Smith. It is sometimes abbreviated in writing as HHJ. It was formerly used for county court judges. Certain British colonial judges were also entitled to the style.

In Hong Kong, which retained much of England's judicial tradition, it is also used as a prefix for district court judges.

In Northern Ireland, the prefix is also used for county court judges.

In Canada, His Honour or Her Honour is used as a title for the lieutenant governor of a province while in office. The spouse of a lieutenant governor is also addressed as His Honour or Her Honour, only while the lieutenant governor is in office. The Honourable is a courtesy title retained for life for a former lieutenant governor.

In the Philippines, uniquely, senators and representatives in Congress during Senate or congressional inquiries and impeachment procedures, and Commission on Elections officials when they convene as provincial and national boards of canvassers in post-election canvasses where certain members of Congress are also members of the national board, are mostly addressed as Your Honor, because it was unfortunately rendered from "the Spanish term for addressing parliamentarians, and a mistake made" when Congress's predecessor, the Philippine Legislature, abruptly changed to the use of English from "mainly Spanish in its deliberations."

Formerly, this style was sometimes used by an enlisted seaman when addressing the captain of a ship, though this practice has not been common since the early Nineteenth Century.
