= NYU Tandon School of Engineering Lynford Lecture Series =

Every year, the New York University Tandon School of Engineering hosts the Lynford lecture series which brings in a prominent thinker who explains complex information and important ideas with clarity and concision. The lecture series is sponsored by Tondra and Jeffrey Lynford and the School of Engineering's Institute for Mathematics and Advanced Supercomputing (IMAS). As of 2016, the lecture series featured three Nobel Prize winners, one Turing Award winner and alumnus of the School of Engineering, the inventor of Ethernet, a nominee of the Democratic Party for President of the United States, a top American nuclear scientist, and the co-founder and Chief Scientist of Sun Microsystems, among others.

Notable lecturers include:

- Eric Schadt, mathematician and computational biologist
- Judea Pearl, winner of the ACM Turing Award, the highest distinction in computer science
- Daniel Kahneman, Nobel laureate in economic sciences
- Myron Scholes, Nobel laureate and co-originator of the Black-Scholes options pricing model
- Frances Allen, IBM fellow emerita
- Jeremy Grantham, chairman and co-founder, GMO
- Lt. Gen. Robert J. Elder, Jr, Commander, 8th Air Force and Joint Functional Component commander for global strike and integration, U.S. Strategic Command
- Robert Metcalfe, inventor of Ethernet
- John L. Petersen, president and founder of The Arlington Institute
- Hillary Clinton, nominee of the Democratic Party for president of the United States in the 2016 election and U.S. senator, New York state
- Richard L. Garwin, American nuclear scientist
- Gerald M. Rubin, genome sequence pioneer
- Robert A. Mundell, 1999 Nobel laureate for economics
- Alan Kay, pioneer of the modern personal computer
- Bill Joy, co-founder, chief scientist and corporate executive officer, Sun Microsystems Inc.
- J. Craig Venter, president, CSO, Celera Genomics
- Ed Witten, professor of physics, Institute for Advanced Study, Princeton, NJ
- Bonnie Bassler, chair of the Department of Molecular Biology at Princeton University, a member of the National Academy of Sciences and the American Academy of Arts and Sciences, a MacArthur Fellow and a TED Talk lecturer.
