= Peter Carl Goldmark =

Hungarian-American inventor (1906–1977)

- Born: Péter Károly Goldmark; December 2, 1906; Budapest, Austria-Hungary
- Died: December 7, 1977 (aged 71); Port Chester, New York, U.S.
- Citizenship: Hungarian, American
- Children: Peter C. Goldmark Jr.
- Engineering career
- Institutions: Columbia Records
- Projects: Long-playing (LP) phonograph Color television

Peter Carl Goldmark (born Péter Károly Goldmark; December 2, 1906 – December 7, 1977) was a Hungarian-American engineer who, during his time with Columbia Records, was instrumental in developing the long-playing microgroove 33 1/3 rpm phonograph disc, the standard for incorporating multiple or lengthy recorded works on a single disc for two generations. The LP was introduced by Columbia's Goddard Lieberson in 1948. Lieberson was later president of Columbia Records from 1956–1971 and 1973–1975. According to György Marx, Goldmark was one of The Martians.

== Early life ==
Goldmark married Frances Trainer, whom he later divorced. Together they had four children; three sons: Peter Jr., Christopher, Andrew and one daughter: Frances. After divorcing Frances Trainer, Goldmark married Diane Davis and had two more children: Jonathan and Susan.

== Career ==
Goldmark worked on televisions for a brief period for the Pye Radio and TV company in Cambridge before moving to the USA to work for CBS.

In addition to his work on the LP record, Goldmark developed field-sequential color technology for color television while at CBS. The system, first demonstrated on August 29, 1940, and shown to the press on September 3 used a rapidly rotating color wheel that alternated transmission in red, green and blue. The system transmitted on 343 lines, about 100 less than a black and white set, and at a different field scan rate, and thus was incompatible with television sets currently on the market without an adapter.

Although CBS did broadcast in color with the Goldmark system in 1950–1951, the "compatible color" technology developed for RCA and NBC (by a team led by Richard Kell, George H. Brown and others) was compatible with existing black and white TVs. Goldmark and others have pointed out that the CBS color wheel system did provide better picture quality (although lower image resolution) than RCA's system, but the compatibility problem proved its downfall. An improved RCA/NBC color system submitted in July 1953 became the industry standard chosen by the Federal Communications Commission (FCC) in December 1953. Ironically, cameras using the color wheel system continued to be used for scientific research for several more decades, including the color lunar surface TV cameras during all the 1970s NASA Apollo Moon landings.

After the success of the LP record, Goldmark spent the next two decades at CBS Laboratories working on various inventions, chief of which was EVR, the Electronic Video Recorder. This futuristic home video playback device used reels of film stored in plastic cassettes to electronically store audio and video signals, and was first announced in 1967. A B&W prototype was demonstrated in 1969 (promising color playback in future models), but the invention floundered when it proved to be difficult and costly to manufacture. CBS was also concerned about the potential of competition from home video devices, particularly those that could record — a fear that eventually proved prescient.

== Later life ==
Goldmark was awarded the Elliott Cresson Medal in 1969. He received the Golden Plate Award of the American Academy of Achievement in 1970.

On November 22, 1977, President Jimmy Carter presented Goldmark with the National Medal of Science "For contributions to the development of the communication sciences for education, entertainment, culture, and human service."

Goldmark died at the age of 71 in an automobile accident on December 7, 1977, in Westchester County, New York.

== See also ==
- The Martians (scientists)
