= Melanie Hartzog =

American social services administrator and former government official

Deputy Mayor of New York City for Health and Human Services
- In office October 2020 – December 2021
- Mayor: Bill de Blasio
- Preceded by: Raul Perea-Henze
- Succeeded by: Anne Williams-Isom

Personal details
- Born: New York City, U.S.
- Children: 3
- Education: Eckerd College; The New School

Melanie Hartzog is an American social services administrator and former government official serving as the president and CEO of the New York Foundling. Her previous roles in New York City government include Deputy Mayor of New York City for Health and Human Services, where she coordinated the city's response to the COVID-19 pandemic, and director of the Mayor's Office of Management and Budget. In the latter role, she was the first woman of color to oversee the largest municipal budget in the United States. On November 5, 2025, mayor-elect Zohran Mamdani named Hartzog a co-chair of his transition team.

== Early life and education ==
Hartzog was born in Brownsville, Brooklyn, and grew up on Long Island. She was raised in a middle-class household, but her family later experienced poverty and housing instability, at one point living in a motel for two years. Hartzog later stated that she did not realize she was homeless at the time. In the sixth grade, she and her family moved in with her grandmother. At school, her basketball coach, Coach Hill, served as a mentor. Her mother's family is from Guyana, and her father moved to Brooklyn from South Carolina. Hartzog has cited her first-hand experience with poverty as a major influence on her decision to pursue a career in human services.

While in college, Hartzog volunteered at a domestic violence shelter, which influenced her to switch her major to social work. She earned a bachelor's degree in human development from Eckerd College. She later received a M.S. in urban policy analysis and management from The New School's Milano School of Policy, Management, and Environment.

After graduating from college, Hartzog intended to work in California but returned to New York to support her family after her 16-year-old brother was arrested. Her brother was subsequently charged as an adult and incarcerated for nearly a decade, an experience Hartzog described as a "wake-up call" about injustice.

== Career ==
In 1998, Hartzog began her career as a social policy and budget analyst in the office of Bronx Borough president Fernando Ferrer, where she worked for over two years. During this time, she met Vincent Fontana of New York Foundling.

Hartzog later served as director of policy and advocacy for the Human Services Council of New York City, Inc. Her early career also included roles as family services coordinator for a deputy mayor for health and human services, deputy commissioner of the New York City Administration for Children's Services (ACS), and leader of a social services unit within the Mayor's Office of Management and Budget.

Beginning in 2013, Hartzog served for three years as the executive director of the New York chapter of the Children's Defense Fund. While there, she helped launch the "Raise the Age" campaign, which successfully advocated for state legislation to raise the age of criminal responsibility in New York to 18.

=== De Blasio administration ===
Following her work at the Children's Defense Fund, mayor Bill de Blasio appointed Hartzog as director of the New York City Mayor's Office of Management and Budget. She was the first woman of color to hold this position, overseeing the largest municipal budget in the nation. In this role, she testified at a 2018 city budget hearing and later contended with a $9 billion budget deficit caused by the COVID-19 pandemic.

In October 2020, de Blasio appointed Hartzog as Deputy Mayor of New York City for Health and Human Services, a move seen as a return to her "child welfare roots." She was the third person appointed to the position in two years. As deputy mayor, she oversaw approximately 11 agencies and was responsible for coordinating the city's public health response to the COVID-19 pandemic. Her duties included coordinating the city's vaccine mandate and ensuring the continuation of social services for vulnerable populations, including foster youth and the homeless. Hartzog stated she worked seven days a week during the height of the pandemic and, after more than a year, felt "burnt out" and "tired" from the "break-neck pace."

=== New York Foundling ===
In September 2021, Hartzog was announced the next president and chief executive officer of New York Foundling, succeeding the retiring Bill Baccaglini. She began the new job in 2022 after a two-week break from her government role. Hartzog initially took the title of president in January 2022 while Baccaglini remained as CEO during a transition period before moving into a senior advisor role.

The New York Foundling is a 154-year-old organization that runs over 40 programs for 30,000 people annually across New York City, its surrounding counties, and Puerto Rico.

=== Mayoral transition team ===
On November 5, 2025, New York City mayor-elect Zohran Mamdani named Hartzog as one of four co-chairs for his transition team.

== Personal life ==
Hartzog lives in Bushwick, Brooklyn, with her three children. She is divorced.
