= Austin J. Tobin =

American businessman and government official

Director of the Port of New York Authority
- In office 1942–1972
- Preceded by: John E. Ramsey
- Succeeded by: Matthias Lukens

Personal details
- Born: Austin Joseph Tobin; May 25, 1903 Brooklyn, New York City, U.S.
- Died: February 8, 1978 (aged 74) Manhattan, New York City, U.S.
- Education: College of the Holy Cross (BA); Fordham University (LLB)

Austin Joseph Tobin (May 25, 1903 – February 8, 1978) was an American businessman who served as the executive director of the Port of New York Authority, the precursor to the Port Authority of New York and New Jersey, from 1942 until 1972.

Tobin is widely known for authorizing the construction of the original World Trade Center, which was destroyed during the September 11 attacks in 2001.

== Background ==
Tobin was born on May 25, 1903, to an Irish-American family in Brooklyn, New York City. He was educated at the College of the Holy Cross and Fordham Law School.

Tobin joined the Port Authority in 1927, where he served the first 15 years of his career in the law department. He started out as a law clerk, and was promoted to assistant general counsel in 1935. In 1942, he was appointed as executive director of the Port Authority. During his thirty years as executive director, the agency gained control of LaGuardia Airport, Idlewild (later renamed John F. Kennedy International Airport), and Newark Airport. He oversaw the development of the original World Trade Center, the creation of the Lincoln Tunnel, and the Port Authority Bus Terminal. When Mr. Tobin joined the agency as a law clerk it had 300 employees. When he retired as executive director in 1972, the agency had 8,000 employees and an investment of $2.6 billion in bridges, airports, ship terminals and other facilities, including the vast World Trade Center.

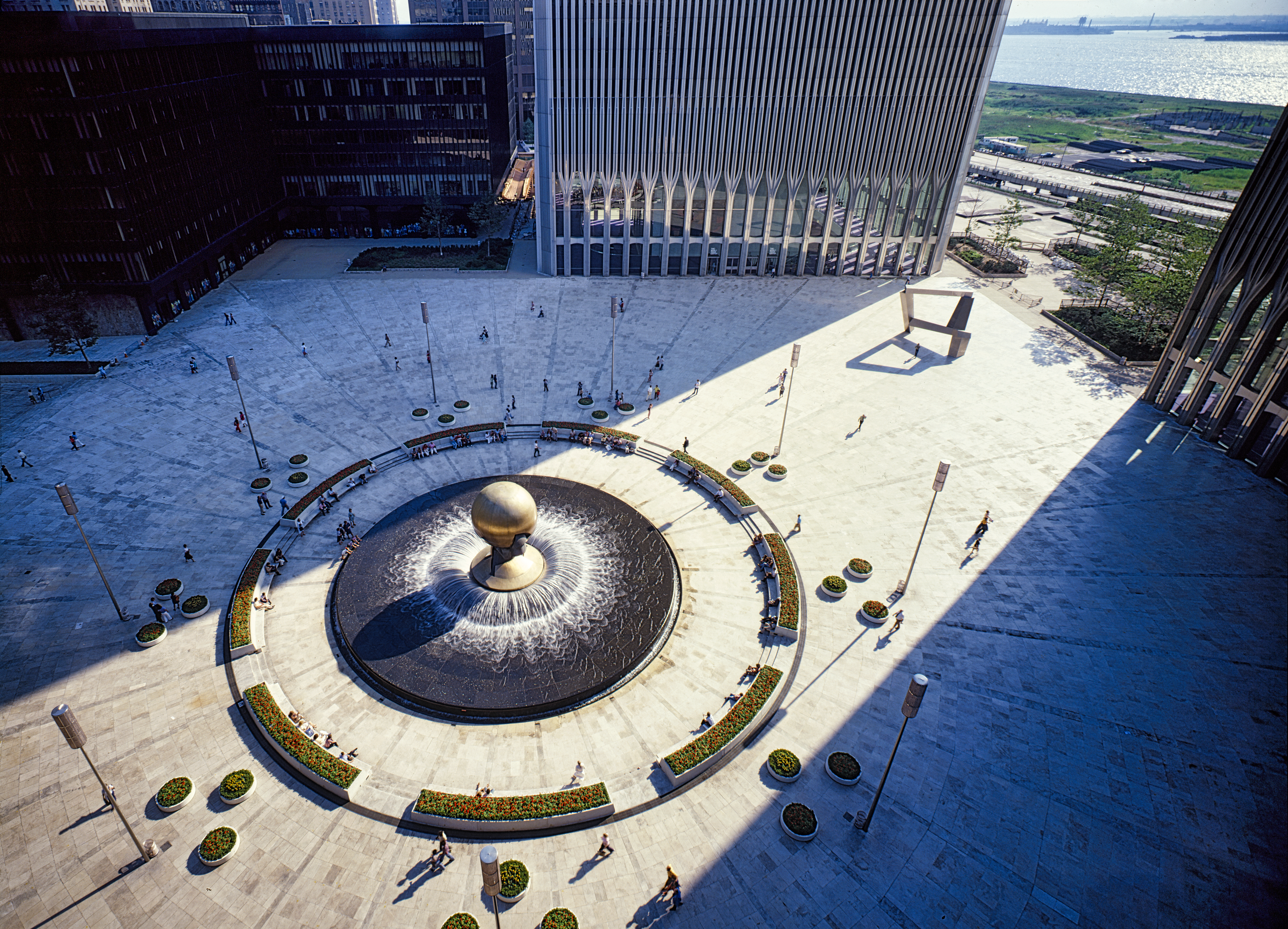
Austin J. Tobin Plaza in 1976

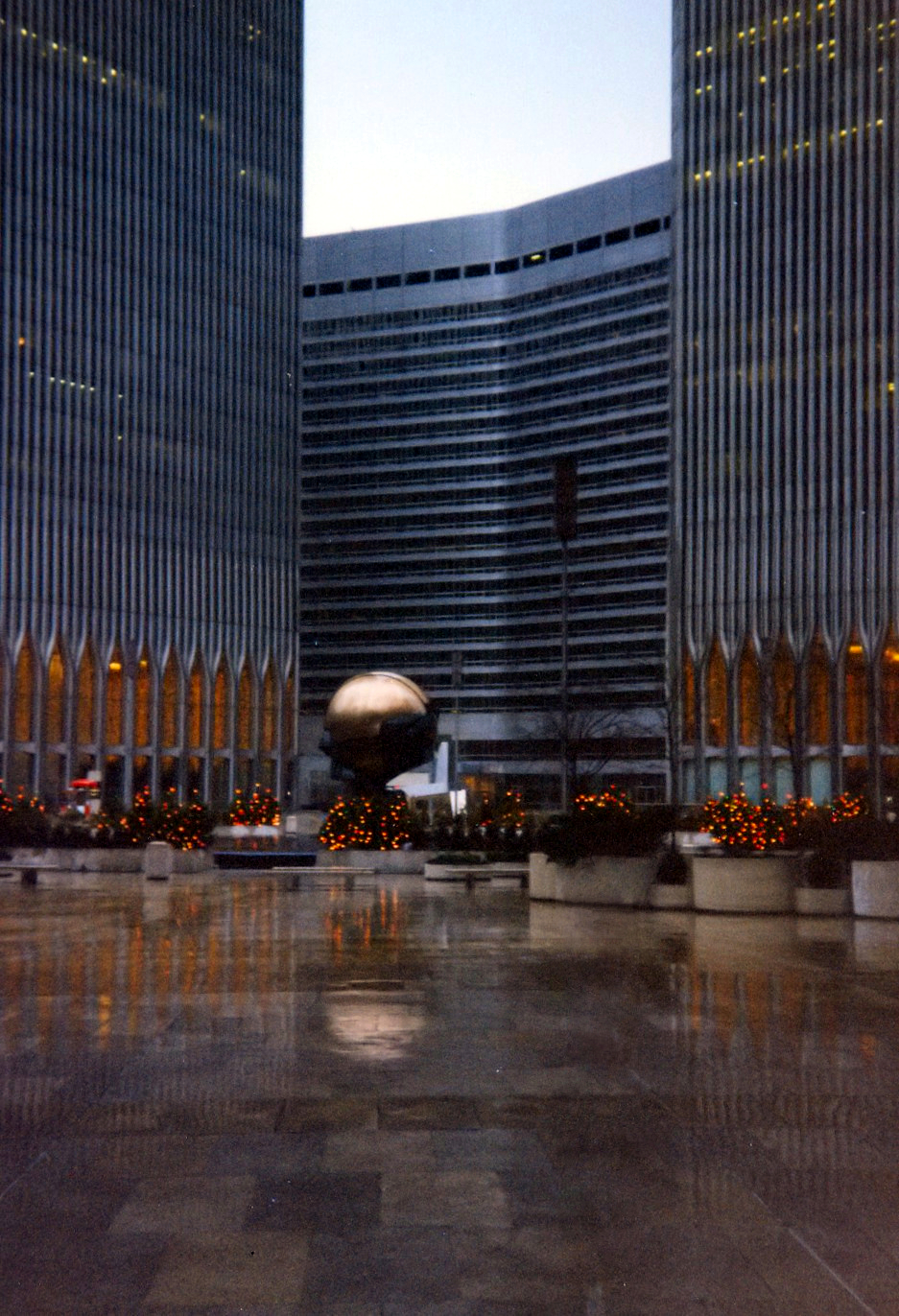
Austin J. Tobin Plaza in 1995

Tobin is noted for his difference of style from Robert Moses, most particularly for his relocation of bus terminal tenants. Tobin also is noted for prioritizing mass transit more than Moses did. Tobin and Moses worked together to help fund and build the Verrazzano–Narrows Bridge and the Throgs Neck Bridge.

In 1966, Tobin received The Hundred Year Association of New York's Gold Medal Award "in recognition of outstanding contributions to the City of New York".

He died on February 8, 1978, in Manhattan, New York City, at the age of 74.

== Legacy ==
=== Austin J. Tobin Plaza ===
In 1982, the Port Authority decided to rename the outdoor plaza at the World Trade Center as the Austin J. Tobin Plaza in his honor. The centerpiece of the plaza was The Sphere, a 25-foot tall bronze sculpture designed by Fritz Koenig. The plaza was destroyed during the September 11 attacks in 2001. The National September 11 Memorial now occupies the site.

== See also ==
- Christopher O. Ward
