= New York City Department of Finance =

New York City government agency

Department of Finance
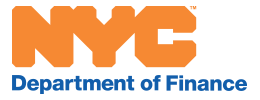

Agency overview
- Jurisdiction: New York City
- Employees: 2,156 (2020)
- Agency executives: Richard Lee, Commissioner; Jeffrey Shear, First Deputy Commissioner; Anthony Miranda, Sheriff
- Key document: New York City Charter
- Website: nyc.gov/finance

The New York City Department of Finance (DOF) is the revenue service, taxation agency and recorder of deeds of the government of New York City. Its Parking Violations Bureau is an administrative court that adjudicates parking violations, while its Sheriff's Office is the city's primary civil law enforcement agency. The current commissioner is Richard Lee, appointed by NYC Mayor Zohran Mamdani in March 2026.

== Responsibilities ==
The New York City Department of Finance (DOF) collects more than US$40 billion in revenue for the City and assesses more than 1.1 million properties that have a combined total market value of $1.3 trillion. In addition, DOF also:

- Records property-related documents
- Administers exemption and abatement programs
- Adjudicates and collects parking tickets
- Maintains the city's treasury
- Participates on and provides administrative support for the NYC Banking Commission
- Oversees the New York City Sheriff's Office, which acts as DOF's law enforcement division and the City's chief civil law enforcement agency.

Through the Mayor's Office of Pensions and Investments, the Department of Finance also advises the Administration on the City's $160 billion pension system and $15 billion deferred compensation plan.

== Organization ==
Organizational chart as of December 2015

- Commissioner of Finance: Preston Niblack
  - First Deputy Commissioner: Jeffrey Shear
    - Deputy Commissioner for Treasury and Payment Services
      - Payments and Receivable Services
      - Adjudications and Parking (Parking Violations Bureau)
      - City Register and Land Records
      - Collections
      - Treasury Operations
      - Payment Operations
    - Deputy Commissioner for Tax Audit and Enforcement
      - Tax Audit
      - Tax Enforcement
      - Property Valuation
    - Deputy Commissioner for Property Division
      - Property Exemption Administration
      - Property Valuation and Tax Mapping
    - Chief Information Officer for Finance Information Technology
      - Property, Collections and Accounting Applications
      - Network Operations
      - Parking and Payment Applications
      - Project Management
      - Tax Policy, Audit and Assessment Applications
      - BTS Systems Modernization
    - Deputy Commissioner for General Counsel
      - Legal Affairs
      - Department Advocate's Office
    - Chief Financial Officer for Administration and Planning
      - Employee Services
      - Financial Management
      - ACCO
    - Deputy Commissioner and Sheriff
      - First Deputy Sheriff

== History ==
In 1801, New York City created the Office of the Comptroller and the City Council was charged with appointing a New York City Comptroller. In 1831, the New York City Department of Finance was established, with the Comptroller serving as its head.

== See also ==
- New York State Department of Taxation and Finance
- Internal Revenue Service
- New York City Office of Administrative Trials and Hearings
- New York City Mayor's Office of Management and Budget
