= Mayor of New York City =

Chief executive of New York City

Mayor of the City of New York
- Seal of the City of New York

- Flag of the mayor of New York City

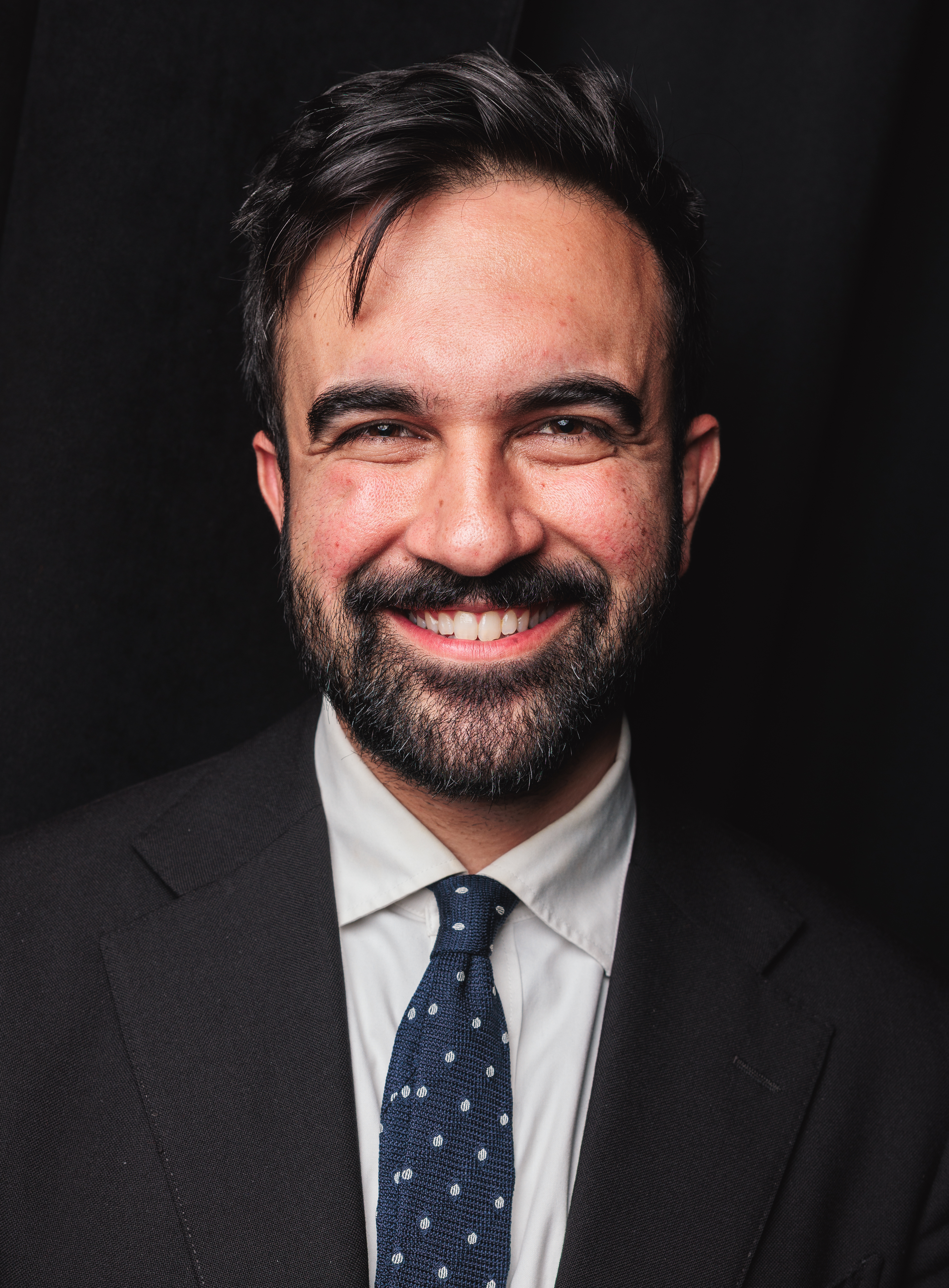
- Incumbent; Zohran Mamdani since January 1, 2026
- Government of New York City
- Style: His Honor; Mr. Mayor (informal)
- Residence: Gracie Mansion
- Seat: New York City Hall
- Term length: Four years, renewable once consecutively
- Constituting instrument: New York City Charter
- Inaugural holder: Thomas Willett
- Formation: June 12, 1665; 361 years ago
- Succession: New York City Public Advocate, then New York City Comptroller
- Unofficial names: Hizzoner
- Deputy: First Deputy Mayor, Dean Fuleihan
- Salary: $258,750 (2024)
- Website: nyc.gov/mayors-office

The mayor of New York City, officially mayor of the City of New York, is head of the executive branch of the government of New York City and the chief executive of New York City. The mayor's office administers all city services, public property, police and fire protection, and most public agencies, and enforces all city and state laws within New York City. The position is often called the "second-hardest job" in the United States.

The budget, overseen by New York City Mayor's Office of Management and Budget, is the largest municipal budget in the United States, totaling $126.8 billion in fiscal year 2026. The city employs 325,000 people, spends about $38 billion to educate more than 1.1 million students (the largest public school system in the United States), and levies $27 billion in taxes. It receives $14 billion from the state and federal governments.

The mayor's office is located in New York City Hall; it has jurisdiction over all five boroughs of New York City: Manhattan, Brooklyn, Queens, the Bronx, and Staten Island. The mayor appoints numerous officials, including deputy mayors and the commissioners who head city agencies and departments. The mayor's regulations are compiled in title 43 of the New York City Rules. According to current law, the mayor is limited to two consecutive four-year terms in office but may run again after a four-year break. The limit on consecutive terms was changed from two to three on October 23, 2008, when the New York City Council voted 29–22 in favor of passing the term limit extension into law, but in 2010, a referendum reverting the limit to two terms passed overwhelmingly.

It has been observed that politicians are rarely elected to any higher office after serving as mayor of New York City; the last elected mayor who later achieved higher office was John T. Hoffman, who became governor of New York in 1869. (The last mayor to win a roughly comparable office was Ardolph Kline, elected to the U.S. Congress for one term in 1920; Kline had become Acting Mayor for part of 1913 without ever having won a city-wide election.) Former mayor Ed Koch said that the post was jinxed due to divine intervention, whereas Michael Bloomberg, who later unsuccessfully ran for president, called the supposed curse "a statistical fluke".

The current and 112th mayor is Zohran Mamdani, who was elected on November 4, 2025, and took office shortly after midnight on January 1, 2026.

== History ==
In 1665, Governor Richard Nicolls appointed Thomas Willett as the first mayor of New York. For 156 years, the mayor was appointed and had limited power. Between 1783 and 1821 the mayor was appointed by the Council of Appointment in which the state's governor had the loudest voice. In 1821 the Common Council, which included elected members, gained the authority to choose the mayor. An amendment to the New York State Constitution in 1834 provided for the direct popular election of the mayor. Cornelius W. Lawrence, a Democrat, was elected that year.

Gracie Mansion has been the official residence of the mayor since Fiorello La Guardia's administration in 1942. Its main floor is open to the public and serves as a small museum.

The mayor is entitled to a salary of $258,750 a year. Michael Bloomberg, mayor of the city from 2002 to 2013 and one of the richest people in the world, declined the salary and instead was paid $1 yearly.

In 2000, direct control of the city's public school system was transferred to the mayor's office. Thereafter, in 2003, the reorganization established the New York City Department of Education.

As a position that is elected, appointed, or hired by the city, the mayor of New York must file their oath of office with the city clerk's office and pay a $9 fee by credit card or money order.

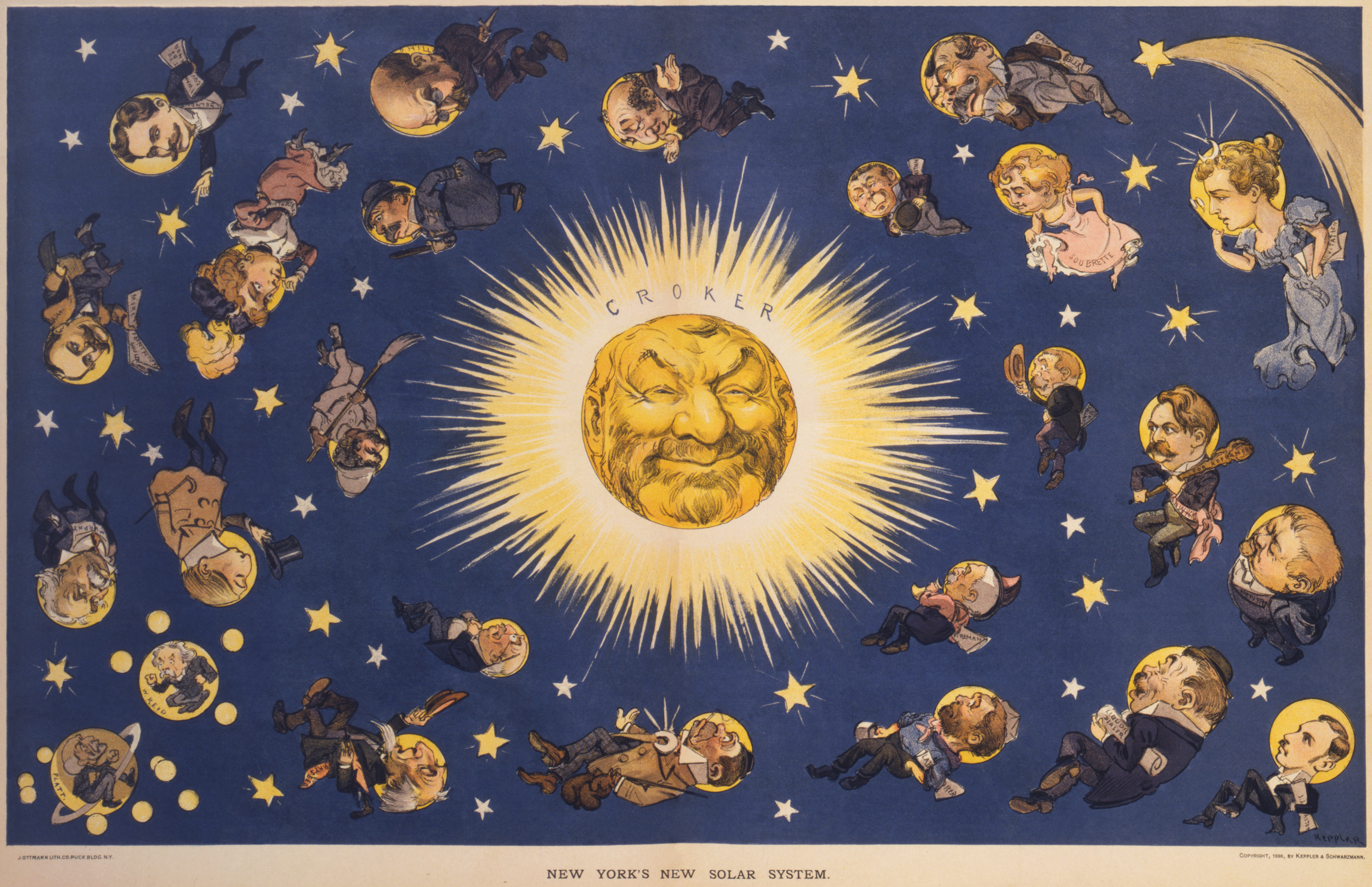
"New York's new solar system": Tammany Hall revolves around Boss Croker in this 1899 cartoon in Puck.

Tammany Hall, which evolved from an organization of craftsmen into a Democratic political machine, was an American political organization founded in 1786 and incorporated on May 12, 1789. It became the main local political machine of the Democratic Party and played a major role in controlling New York City and New York State politics. The organization gained control of Democratic Party nominations in the state and city in 1861, and played a major role in New York City politics into the 1960s and was a dominant player from the mayoral victory of Fernando Wood in 1854 through the era of Robert Wagner (1954–1965). Its last political leader was an African American man named J. Raymond Jones.

== Deputies ==
The mayor of New York City may appoint several deputy mayors to help oversee major offices within the executive branch of the city government. The powers and duties, and even the number of deputy mayors, are not defined by the City Charter. The majority of agency commissioners and department heads report to one of the deputy mayors, giving the role a great deal of power within a mayoral administration.

== Offices appointed ==
"The mayor has the power to appoint and remove the commissioners of more than 40 city agencies and members of City boards and commissions." These include:

- New York City Police Commissioner
- New York City Fire Commissioner
- New York City Criminal Court judges
- New York City Marshals
- New York City Schools Chancellor (from 2002)
- New York City Mayor's Office of Management and Budget
- Commissioner of Health of the City of New York

== Board member ==
The mayor of New York City is an ex officio board member of the following organizations:

- American Museum of Natural History
- Brooklyn Academy of Music
- Brooklyn Botanic Garden
- Brooklyn Children's Museum
- Brooklyn Museum of Art
- Brooklyn Public Library
- Carnegie Hall
- El Museo del Barrio
- Lincoln Center for the Performing Arts
- Metropolitan Museum of Art
- Museum of Jewish Heritage
- Museum of the City of New York
- National September 11 Memorial & Museum
- New York Botanical Garden
- New York Hall of Science
- New York Public Library
- New York Shakespeare Festival
- Public Design Commission
- Queens Borough Public Library
- Queens Botanical Garden
- Queens Museum of Art
- Snug Harbor Cultural Center
- Staten Island Botanical Garden
- Staten Island Children's Museum
- Staten Island Historical Society
- Staten Island Institute of Arts and Sciences
- Staten Island Zoo
- Wave Hill
- Wildlife Conservation Society

== Removal from office ==
According to the New York City Charter, the governor of New York has the power to remove the mayor from office in response to allegations of misconduct, but the governor must hear the mayor's defense of the allegations before doing so. The governor can suspend the mayor for 30 days while considering the allegations. In 2024, it was reported that Governor Kathy Hochul was considering whether to use that process against Eric Adams after his indictment on federal corruption charges. Prior to 2024, the last New York governor to consider exercising this power was Franklin D. Roosevelt, who in 1932 considered suspending Mayor Jimmy Walker, after the latter was accused of taking bribes from city contractors. Walker resigned before Roosevelt could remove him.

The charter also provides a separate process for the mayor's removal without the involvement of the governor: a five-member "Inability Committee" is established by the charter composed of the city's corporation counsel (head of the New York City Law Department), the speaker of the New York City Council, a deputy mayor (designated by the mayor, or the longest serving deputy if none is designated), the New York City Comptroller, and the longest-serving borough president; by a four-fifths vote, the committee can refer allegations of misconduct or incapacity to the New York City Council, which can then by a two-thirds vote either permanently remove the mayor from office or temporarily suspend them. This process has never been used.

== Line of succession ==
=== Order of succession ===
In the event that the mayor is suspended, removed from office, deceased, or otherwise unable to fulfill their duties, the following people serve as acting mayor:

1. Public Advocate of New York City
2. Comptroller of New York City

=== Limitations on the acting mayor ===
An acting mayor has all the power of the office of mayor, but cannot fire any deputy mayor. Unless serving as acting mayor for more than 9 days, they also cannot sign, approve, or disapprove any local law or resolution.

== See also ==
- List of mayors of New York City
- New York City mayoral elections (since 1897)
- Borough president
- Government of New York City
- History of New York City
- New York City Council
- New York City Public Advocate
- New York City Comptroller
- New York City Board of Estimate (1897–1990)
- New York City Civil Court
- New York City Criminal Court
- New York City: the 51st State
