= List of deputy mayors of New York City =

The mayor of New York City may appoint several deputy mayors to help oversee major offices within the executive branch of the city government. The powers and duties, and even the number of deputy mayors, are not defined by the City Charter.

The post was created by Fiorello La Guardia (who appointed Grover Whalen as deputy mayor) to handle ceremonial events that the mayor was too busy to attend. Since then, deputy mayors have been appointed with their areas of responsibility defined by the appointing mayor. There are currently nine deputy mayors, all of whom report directly to the mayor. The majority of agency commissioners and department heads report to one of the deputy mayors, giving the role a great deal of power within a mayoral administration.

Deputy mayors do not have any right to succeed to the mayoralty in the case of vacancy or incapacity of the mayor.

== Current deputy mayors ==
- Dean Fuleihan, First Deputy Mayor

Advises the mayor on citywide administrative, operational, and policy matters. Oversees and coordinates operations of the Office of Management and Budget, the Office of Policy Planning and Delivery, the Department of Finance, the Office for Economic Opportunity, the Office of Minority and Women-Owned Business Enterprises, the chief efficiency officer, the New York City Housing Authority, the Department of Housing Preservation and Development, the Office of Housing Recovery Operations, the Office to Protect Tenants, the Department of Small Business Services, the Department of Consumer and Worker Protection, the Department of City Planning, the Department of Cultural Affairs, the Office of Media and Entertainment, the Landmarks Preservation Commission, the Office of Talent and Workforce Development, the Public Design Commission, and New York City Tourism + Conventions.

- Leila Bozorg, Deputy Mayor for Housing and Planning
- Julie Su, Deputy Mayor for Economic Justice
- Helen Arteaga Landaverde, Deputy Mayor for Health and Human Services

Oversees and coordinates the operations of the Human Resources Administration, Department of Homeless Services, the Administration for Children's Services, New York City Health and Hospitals, and related agencies.

- Julia Kerson, Deputy Mayor for Operations

Oversees and coordinates the operations of the Department of Environmental Protection, Department of Sanitation, Department of Transportation, Department of Parks and Recreation, Department of Design and Construction, School Construction Authority, Department of Buildings, and related agencies.

- Renita Francois, Deputy Mayor for Community Safety

Oversees and coordinates the operations of the Office of Community Safety.

== Notable former deputy mayors ==
=== Under Eric Adams ===
- Randy Mastro 2025 First Deputy Mayor
- Chauncey Parker 2024–2025 Deputy Mayor for Public Safety
- Maria Torres-Springer 2024–2025 First Deputy Mayor, 2022–2024 Deputy Mayor for Housing and Economic Development
- Meera Joshi 2022–2025 Deputy Mayor for Operations
- Anne Williams-Isom 2022–2025 Deputy Mayor for Health and Human Services
- Sheena Wright 2023–2024 First Deputy Mayor
- Philip Banks III 2022–2024 Public Safety
- Lorraine Grillo 2022 First Deputy Mayor

=== Under Bill de Blasio ===
- Emma Wolfe 2020–2021 Administration
- Dean Fuleihan 2018–2021 First Deputy Mayor
- Anthony Shorris 2014–2017 First Deputy Mayor
- Vicki Been 2019–2021 Housing and Economic Development
- Alicia Glen 2014–2019 Housing and Economic Development
- Melanie Hartzog 2020-2021 Health and Human Services
- Herminia Palacio 2016–2019 Health and Human Services
- Lilliam Barrios-Paoli 2014–2016 Health and Human Services

=== Under Michael Bloomberg ===
- Robert K. Steel 2010–2013
- Howard Wolfson 2010–2013
- Stephen Goldsmith 2010–2011
- Dennis Walcott 2002–2011
- Daniel L. Doctoroff 2002–2008
- Patricia Harris 2001–2013

=== Previous administrations ===
- Joe Lhota 1998–2001, under Rudy Giuliani
- William Lynch 1990–1992, under David Dinkins
- Randy Daniels 1992, under David Dinkins
- Barry F. Sullivan 1992–1994, under David Dinkins
- Kenneth Lipper 1983, under Ed Koch
- Robert F. Wagner Jr. 1979–1983, under Ed Koch
- Basil Paterson 1978–1979, under Ed Koch
- Robert J. Milano 1978, under Ed Koch
- Herman Badillo 1977–1979, under Ed Koch
- Osborn Elliott 1976–1977, under Abraham Beame
- Robert W. Sweet 1966–1969, under John Lindsay
- Charles Henry Tenney 1962–1965, under Robert F. Wagner Jr.
