= 2026 New York City ballot proposals =

Five ballot proposals in 2026 New York election

In July 2026, the NYC Commission on Government Efficiency and the NYC Charter Revision Commission released five ballot proposals to appear on the general election ballot in New York City on November 3, 2026. The proposals are all focused around improving the speed and efficiency of city government.

== Background ==
In May 2026, New York City Mayor Zohran Mamdani established the NYC Commission on Government Efficiency (COGE), which was charged with reviewing the entire City Charter to identify ways to improve efficiency, modernize city government, and ensure government keeps pace with New Yorkers’ needs. In June and July 2026, COGE hosted several public hearings throughout the city, with core themes revolving around unlocking public space, acceleration, modernization, and fiscal stability. In late July 2026, COGE released their final report, and voted unanimously to approve each ballot measure for the election.

== Proposal 1 ==
Proposal 1: Speed Up Process for Granting a Revocable Consent to Use Public Space would remove mandatory public hearings and City Council review for certain uses of public space, such as ramps, planters, and cafes. If passed, this proposal would combine the sidewalk café and roadway dining revocable consent process into a single application and modernizing public notice requirements. This would cut the outdoor dining application process from 8 months to 2 months, and is estimated to save small businesses thousands.

2026 New York City Proposal 1
- November 3, 2026
- Speed Up Timeline for Using Public Space – Including Outdoor Dining, Ramps and Benches

Results
Choice	Votes	%
Yes	1,099,934	63.38%
No	635,474	36.62%
Total votes	1,735,408	100.00%

=== Endorsements ===
Yes

Labor unions

- District Council 37

Organizations

- Citizens Union
- Jews for Racial and Economic Justice
- Municipal Art Society of New York
- New York City Democratic Socialists of America
- New York Lawyers for the Public Interest
- OpenPlans
- Regional Plan Association
No

Organizations

- Common Cause New York
Declined to endorse

Organizations

- League of Women Voters New York City

== Proposal 2 ==
Proposal 2: Procurement Policy Board Authority would reform the contracting process to improve procurements, including for small businesses and nonprofits by simplifying contractor paperwork and requiring quarterly meetings of the Procurement Policy Board. If passed, the proposition would save up to 30 days on procurements and would reduce nonprofit procurement time from 13 months to 6 months by moving from procurements to grants.

2026 New York City Proposal 2
- November 3, 2026
- Reform the Contracting Process to Improve Procurements, including for Small Business and Nonprofits

Results
Choice	Votes	%
Yes	1,061,799	61.77%
No	657,038	38.23%
Total votes	1,718,837	100.00%

=== Endorsements ===
Yes

Labor unions

- District Council 37

Organizations

- Citizens Union
- Common Cause New York
- Hotel and Gaming Trades Council
- Jews for Racial and Economic Justice
- Municipal Art Society of New York
- New York City Democratic Socialists of America
- New York Lawyers for the Public Interest
Declined to endorse

Organizations

- League of Women Voters New York City

== Proposal 3 ==
Proposal 3: Changes to Street Project Approval, City Property Disposition, and Office Leasing would fast-track street safety infrastructures, the acquisition of office space for city workers, and the activation of city land via disposition of unused property, including air rights. The proposal would simplify the review of street safety projects, such as bike lanes, to reduce construction timelines and to allow the DOT Commissioner to fast-track critical street infrastructure improvements. If passed, it will speed up street safety projects by at least 33%, would reduce the time of sale of city-owned land from 7 months to 90 days, and is estimated to unlock more than $200 million in revenue for the city from the sale of surplus lots.

2026 New York City Proposal 3
- November 3, 2026
- Fast-Track Street Safety Infrastructure Including Bike Lanes, Acquisition of Office Space and Activation of City Land

Results
Choice	Votes	%
Yes	1,133,761	65.70%
No	591,982	34.30%
Total votes	1,725,743	100.00%

=== Endorsements ===
Yes

Labor unions

- District Council 37

Organizations

- Citizens Union
- Hotel and Gaming Trades Council
- Jews for Racial and Economic Justice
- New York City Democratic Socialists of America
- Open New York
- Regional Plan Association
- Transportation Alternatives
No

Organizations

- Municipal Art Society of New York
Declined to endorse

Organizations

- Common Cause New York
- League of Women Voters New York City

== Proposal 4 ==
Proposal 4: Changes to Building Permitting would simplify building permitting as well as move waterfront permitting from the Department of Small Business Services to the Department of Buildings. The proposal would centralize construction permits through a hub where applicants can access and manage construction-related permits and approvals across various agencies. It would also expand construction approval to more officials within the Department of Buildings. If passed, it would bring 40 approvals from 18 separate offices and agencies into one place and centralize waterfront permitting within the Department of Buildings.

2026 New York City Proposal 4
- November 3, 2026
- Simplify Building Permitting

Results
Choice	Votes	%
Yes	1,155,304	67.67%
No	552,003	32.33%
Total votes	1,707,307	100.00%

=== Endorsements ===
Yes

Labor unions

- District Council 37

Organizations

- Citizens Union
- Common Cause New York
- Hotel and Gaming Trades Council
- Jews for Racial and Economic Justice
- Municipal Art Society of New York
- New York City Democratic Socialists of America
- Open New York
- Regional Plan Association
Declined to endorse

Organizations

- League of Women Voters New York City

== Proposal 5 ==
Proposal 5: Contribution Targets for Rainy Day Fund would set contribution goals for the rainy day fund to ensure sufficient budgetary reserves and require the Mayor's Office of Management and Budget to establish a deposit formula that would govern mandatory contributions to the rainy day fund. The proposal establishes a reserve target of 12%. Additionally, it would also review standard hires and promotions within 14 days and capital project initiation applications within 40 days.

2026 New York City Proposal 5
- November 3, 2026
- Set Contributions Goals for Rainy Day Fund to Ensure Sufficient Budgetary Reserves

Results
Choice	Votes	%
Yes	1,243,219	72.49%
No	471,812	27.51%
Total votes	1,715,031	100.00%

=== Endorsements ===
Yes

Labor unions

- District Council 37

Organizations

- Citizens Union
- Common Cause New York
- Hotel and Gaming Trades Council
- Jews for Racial and Economic Justice
- New York City Democratic Socialists of America
Declined to endorse

Organizations

- League of Women Voters New York City
