= Maria Torres-Springer =

American government official and nonprofit executive

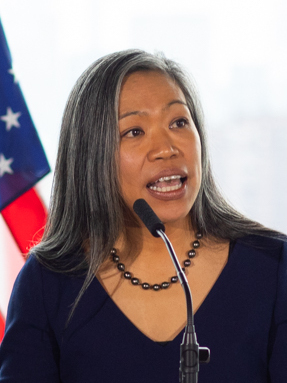
- Torres-Springer in 2022

First Deputy Mayor of New York City
- In office October 8, 2024 – March 14, 2025
- Mayor: Eric Adams
- Preceded by: Anne Williams-Isom (acting); Sheena Wright
- Succeeded by: Suzanne Miles-Gustave (acting); Camille Joseph Varlack (interim); Randy Mastro

Deputy Mayor of New York City for Housing, Economic Development, and Workforce
- In office January 1, 2022 – March 14, 2025
- Mayor: Eric Adams
- Preceded by: Vicki Been
- Succeeded by: Adolfo Carrión Jr.

Commissioner of the New York City Department of Housing Preservation and Development
- In office January 17, 2017 – March 7, 2019
- Mayor: Bill de Blasio
- Preceded by: Vicki Been
- Succeeded by: Louise Carroll

President of the New York City Economic Development Corporation
- In office June 29, 2015 – January 16, 2017
- Mayor: Bill De Blasio
- Preceded by: Michael Schlein
- Succeeded by: James Patchett

Commissioner of the New York City Department of Small Business Services
- In office January 21, 2014 – June 28, 2015
- Mayor: Bill de Blasio
- Preceded by: Robert Walsh
- Succeeded by: Gregg Bishop

Personal details
- Born: January 24, 1977 (age 49) Los Angeles, California, U.S.
- Party: Democratic
- Spouse: Jamie Torres-Springer
- Children: 2
- Education: Yale University (BA); Harvard University (MPP)

Maria Torres-Springer (born January 24, 1977) is an American government official and former nonprofit executive. Torres-Springer is the first Filipina to serve as First Deputy Mayor of New York City. Previously the vice president for U.S. programs at the Ford Foundation, she has been city's Deputy Mayor for Housing, Economic Development and Workforce; Commissioner of the NYC Department of Small Business Services; and Commissioner of the NYC Department of Housing Preservation and Development (HPD). She was also the president and CEO of the NYC Economic Development Corporation (EDC). Torres-Springer was the First Deputy Mayor of New York City from October 8, 2024 to March 14, 2025 when she resigned. On November 5, 2025, mayor-elect Zohran Mamdani named her a co-chair to his transition team.

== Early life and education ==
Torres-Springer was born in Los Angeles, California, to parents from the Philippines: her father Manny from Pampanga, himself the youngest of 23, and her mother Elsa from Batangas. She lived in the Philippines with two siblings from ages nine to fourteen after her mother died. Though Manny Torres worked multiple jobs, the Torres family often struggled financially, relying on Section 8 vouchers and food stamps throughout Torres-Springer's childhood. Torres-Springer was the second of six: She has five sisters and one brother.

Torres-Springer completed a bachelor's degree in ethics, politics, and economics at Yale University in 1999. The first to attend college in her family, she was able to attend because her parents pooled all of their savings. Torres-Springer earned a master's in public policy from the Harvard Kennedy School in 2005.

== Career ==
Torres-Springer was a senior policy advisor in the office of the deputy mayor of New York City for economic development and rebuilding. She was the chief operating officer of Friends of the High Line. She worked as the executive vice president and chief of staff of the New York City Economic Development Corporation (NYCEDC).

Torres-Springer served as vice president for U.S. programs at the Ford Foundation from 2019 to 2021. In 2025 she returned to the foundation as a senior fellow.

=== De Blasio administration ===
While Bill de Blasio was the Mayor of New York City, Torres-Springer served as the commissioner of the New York City Department of Small Business Services before becoming the president and CEO of the NYCEDC in June 2015. De Blasio later appointed Torres-Springer to lead the New York City Department of Housing Preservation and Development. In those roles, she redeveloped the Spofford Juvenile Center into an arts center with affordable housing. Torres-Springer also oversaw the Far Rockaway, Queens neighborhood plan. In February 2019, she stepped down from the department of housing preservation in what real-estate magazine The Real Deal called part of "the latest in a wave of top officials leaving the de Blasio administration." During her time in the De Blasio administration, Torres-Springer worked under Deputy Mayor Alicia Glen.

=== Adams administration ===
In December 2021, then-New York City mayor-elect Eric Adams named her the incoming deputy mayor for economic and workforce development. Torres-Springer and Meera Joshi are the first Asian Americans to serve as deputy mayors of New York City. They assumed those positions effective January 1, 2022.

In December 2023, it was reported that Torres-Springer was influential in fast-tracking FDNY inspection of 50 Hudson Yards-owned by political donor Related Companies-ahead of several schools, apartments, and other buildings.

In October 2024, Torres-Springer was appointed First Deputy Mayor of New York City after the resignation of Sheena Wright. Torres-Springer announced that she would resign from the role on February 17, 2025, leaving office on March 14 after federal prosecutors sought to drop Adams' federal indictment for corruption.

=== Mamdani administration ===
In November 2025, Torres-Springer was named a co-chair of mayor-elect Zohran Mamdani's transition team.

== Personal life ==
Torres-Springer resided in Brooklyn. She is married to Jamie Torres-Springer, commissioner of the Department of Design and Construction (DDC) under Mayor Bill de Blasio and now president of Construction & Development at the Metropolitan Transportation Authority. They have two daughters, a 14-year-old and a 10-year-old. Torres-Springer speaks some Tagalog and Kapampangan.

== See also ==
- Filipinos in the New York metropolitan area
