= Camille Joseph Varlack =

American attorney and government official

Deputy Mayor of New York City for Administration
- In office January 13, 2025 – December 31, 2025
- Mayor: Eric Adams
- Preceded by: Emma Wolfe
- Succeeded by: Position abolished

Chief of Staff to the Mayor of New York City
- In office January 2023 – December 31, 2025
- Mayor: Eric Adams
- Preceded by: Frank Carone
- Succeeded by: Elle Bisgaard-Church

Interim First Deputy Mayor of New York City
- In office March 14, 2025 – March 20, 2025
- Mayor: Eric Adams
- Preceded by: Suzanne Miles-Gustave (acting); Maria Torres-Springer
- Succeeded by: Randy Mastro

Personal details
- Education: Brooklyn Law School (JD); State University of New York at Buffalo (BA)

Camille Joseph Varlack is an American attorney and government official who served as New York City Deputy Mayor for Administration from January to December 2025 and chief of staff to New York City Mayor Eric Adams from January 2023 to December 2025. She also served as interim First Deputy Mayor of New York City from March 14, 2025, after the departure of former first deputy mayor Maria Torres-Springer until the appointment of Randy Mastro as first deputy mayor on March 20, 2025.

She previously served as founding partner and the chief operating officer of Bradford Edwards & Varlack, LLP, a complex civil and commercial litigation firm based in New York, New York, from September 2020 until November 2022. Prior to that, she served as chief operating officer and deputy general counsel of Pierce Bainbridge LLP, a national civil litigation firm, from April 2019 to August 2020.

== Education ==
She earned a Juris Doctor (J.D.) from Brooklyn Law School and a Bachelor of Arts (B.A.) from the State University of New York at Buffalo. She is admitted to the Bar of the State of New York.

== Career ==
She began her legal career as an Assistant District Attorney in Kings County. Subsequently, she joined AXA Equitable Life Insurance Company, where she served as Assistant Vice President and Counsel, and as Corporate Secretary of a broker-dealer subsidiary. She then returned to public service as a principal court attorney to a New York State Supreme Court Justice. She also served under Governor Andrew Cuomo in the New York State Executive Chamber as deputy director of State Operations from March 2018 to April 2019. In that capacity, she managed the operations, policy development, and the implementation of major initiatives across more than 60 state agencies and authorities. She was in charge of leading teams through statewide crises, including natural disasters, storm response, potential terrorist activities, and cyber attacks, as well as responding to a multitude of public health crises.

Prior to that, she served as Chief Risk Officer and Special Counsel from July 2017 to April 2019. As Chief Risk Officer, she oversaw audit, compliance, and internal control issues for state agencies and was instrumental in the development and implementation of the first statewide enterprise risk management system. From March 2020 to June 2020, Varlack served as a member of the New York State COVID-19 Task Force. From May 2015 to August 2017, she served as Special Counsel for Ethics, Risk and Compliance to the Superintendent of the New York State Department of Financial Services.
