= Frank Carone =

American politician and lawyer

Chief of Staff to the Mayor of New York City
- In office January 2022 – December 2022
- Mayor: Eric Adams
- Preceded by: Emma Wolfe
- Succeeded by: Camille Joseph Varlack

Personal details
- Born: 1969 (age 56–57) Canarsie, Brooklyn, New York City, New York, U.S.
- Party: Democratic Party
- Education: Brooklyn Law School
- Committees: Museum of Modern Art

Frank Carone (born 1969) is an American political figure and lawyer. Known for serving as Chief of Staff for New York Mayor Eric Adams in 2022, he has also served as lead counsel to the Brooklyn Democratic Party. He was involved in political campaigns such as Adams' successful bid for Brooklyn borough president in 2013, and also supported Adams' 2021 bid for New York Mayor as his lawyer, fundraiser, and adviser.

Appointed Chief of Staff in January 2022, according to Crain's New York Business, Carone was "instrumental in forming the administration's policy." At the start of 2023, he formed the consulting firm Oaktree Solutions. He is a former commissioner of the New York City Taxi and Limousine Commission, and board member of the Museum of Modern Art.

== Early life and education ==
Born in Canarsie, Brooklyn in 1969, Carone grew up in the Canarsie neighborhood. He served in the United States Marine Corps from 1993 to 1995, and received his Juris Doctor degree from Brooklyn Law School.

== Career ==
He first became involved in Brooklyn politics through the Thomas Jefferson Club in Canarsie, where he met Frank Seddio, his future business partner. In 2008 they formed a firm that merged with the New York law firm Abrams Fensterman in 2011. In 2011, Carone was named counsel to the Brooklyn Democratic Party, serving as their "top lawyer", according to the New York Times.

By 2019, he was known in the press as a "longtime ally" of then Brooklyn Mayor Bill de Blasio. That year, an eminent domain deal between de Blasio's administration and the Podolsky family came under scrutiny for potential conflicts of interest, as Carone was assisting the Podolsky family as counsel. de Blasio and Carone denied discussing the real estate deal together.

=== Chief of staff for Mayor Eric Adams ===
Mayor of New York City Eric Adams named Carone his chief of staff in January 2022. Due to conflict of interest concerns in relation to his legal practice, before becoming chief of staff he retired from Abrams Fensterman. Among the projects he worked on were repairing a stretch of waterfront on the Brooklyn-Queens Expressway, and in May 2022 he spearheaded New York City's failed bid to host the 2024 Democratic National Convention. Carone was also involved a deal to potentially build a New York City Football Club stadium in Queens.

As chief of staff, Carone continued to be scrutinized for possible breaches of ethics. For example, Carone's practice of holding official meetings at private clubs and high-end restaurants attracted criticism in the press. In May 2022 it was reported that Carone had held investments in Wrap Technologies between 2017 and 2021, and that Adams had praised Wrap Technologies' policing products during that same period. In response to arguments that Carone should have revealed his investments publicly, both Carone and Adams denied they'd conversed about the company together.

Stating that he planned on serving as a chairman on Adams' 2025 re-election campaign, he left his post as chief of staff in December 2022. Upon retiring from Adams' administration, city law prevented Carone from directly lobbying City Hall for one year. Shortly after Carone retired, New York City Council member Lincoln Restler proposed legislation to extend the one year ban to two years, with Politico writing that among lawmakers, the bill was "widely viewed as a way to limit Carone's influence."

=== Oaktree ===
In January 2023 he launched Oaktree Solutions. Carone was also "planning to stay involved in politics" by working with Representative Hakeem Jeffries as the politician "looks to take back the House of Representatives." By March 2023, the firm represented clients such as Northwell Health, New York Giants player Saquon Barkley, and the real estate company Durst Organization. In 2023, Carone was working with SL Green on a bid to open a casino in Times Square.

== Board memberships ==
Carone was a member of the Riseboro Community Partnership board from 2011 through 2019 and a board appointee to the New York City Taxi and Limousine Commission in 2011 until 2016.

He was previously on the boards of the Kings County Democratic Committee, Hanover Bank and was the Mayor's designee to the board of the Museum of Modern Art.

== Personal life ==
Carone and his wife Diana live in Brooklyn, New York.

In February 2022, he was subpoenaed for documents in a federal civil racketeering suit filed by Geico against several medical clinics. Bloomberg reported that Carone was not named as a defendant.

== Federal indictment ==
United States v. Frank V. Carone
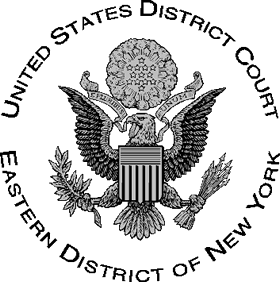
- Court: United States District Court for the Eastern District of New York
- Started: June 12, 2026
- Docket nos.: 1:26-cr-177
- Charge: Travel Act bribery; Bribery concerning programs receiving Federal funds; Honest services fraud; Money laundering; Obstruction of justice; Tax fraud.

Court membership
- Judge sitting: Kiyo A. Matsumoto

On June 24, 2026, Carone was arrested for an alleged bribery scheme. His brother Anthony was also arrested as part of the scheme.

The indictment unsealed in the United States District Court for the Eastern District of New York charges Frank and Anthony Carone with violations of the Travel Act, bribery concerning programs receiving Federal funds, honest services fraud, money laundering, obstruction of justice, and tax fraud.

The alleged scheme involved the Carones accepting bribes to corruptly steer federally-supported funds for housing the homeless to hoteliers Yan Po Zhu and Crystal Chen, and using several means to obscure the bribes' paper trails.

== See also ==
- One Astor Plaza
