= Summit Appliance =

- Summit Appliance, Division of Felix Storch, Inc.
- Type: Private
- Founded: 1969 in Bronx, New York City, United States
- Founder: Felix Storch
- Headquarters: Bronx, New York City, United States
- Number of employees: 150-200
- Website: summitappliance.com

Summit Appliance is the residential product division of Felix Storch, Inc (FSI). It was founded and trademarked in 1969 and is now headquartered in the Bronx, New York City, where their manufacturing and operations are done. They have additional warehousing facilities in Edison, New Jersey. Summit is both an importer and manufacturer of appliances. Internationally, it sources products from manufacturers in Europe, South America, North America, and Asia. Many products are built or modified in its Bronx manufacturing facilities, for which it is recognized as a “Made In NYC” partner.

== Product line ==
Summit Appliance carries over 600 basic models of specialty refrigerators and freezers, including the industry's largest collection of built-in undercounter and American Disabilities Act (ADA) compliant models. Summit's residential and professional product line includes a large selection of frost-free refrigerators, gas and electric ranges, gas, induction, and electric cooktops (some of which are manufactured in its Bronx premises), wine cellars, beer dispensers, laundry, dishwashers, and weatherproof outdoor appliances. They also serve the commercial and food service market with beverage centers, display freezers, ice makers and other appliances that comply with NSF standards. They serve the medical market through AccuCold by Summit Appliance, where its line includes vaccine refrigeration, low temperature freezers, and general purpose refrigeration. PureTherm by Summit Appliance specializes in warming cabinets. Some products sold under the Summit name are actually re-branded products made by other companies.

Summit Appliance manufactures appliances for small kitchens, selling their first mini-fridge in the U.S. back in 1970 Summit sells specialty products where base units are modified to meet the specific needs of specialty markets.

== Partnerships ==
Since 2006, Summit Appliance has worked with the New York City Department of Small Business Services to train its manufacturing and operations staff. In 2014, it was recognized as one of the leading New York employers in hiring veterans through a partnership with the non-profit organization The Jericho Project.

== Distribution ==
Summit appliances are sold through major and specialty distributors and online distributors throughout the United States and Canada. Deliveries made to the Northeastern region of the United States are generally made by Summit's truck fleet. Outside of this region, orders are drop shipped or sent via common carrier.
