= Nadine B. Hack =

Irish-American businesswoman

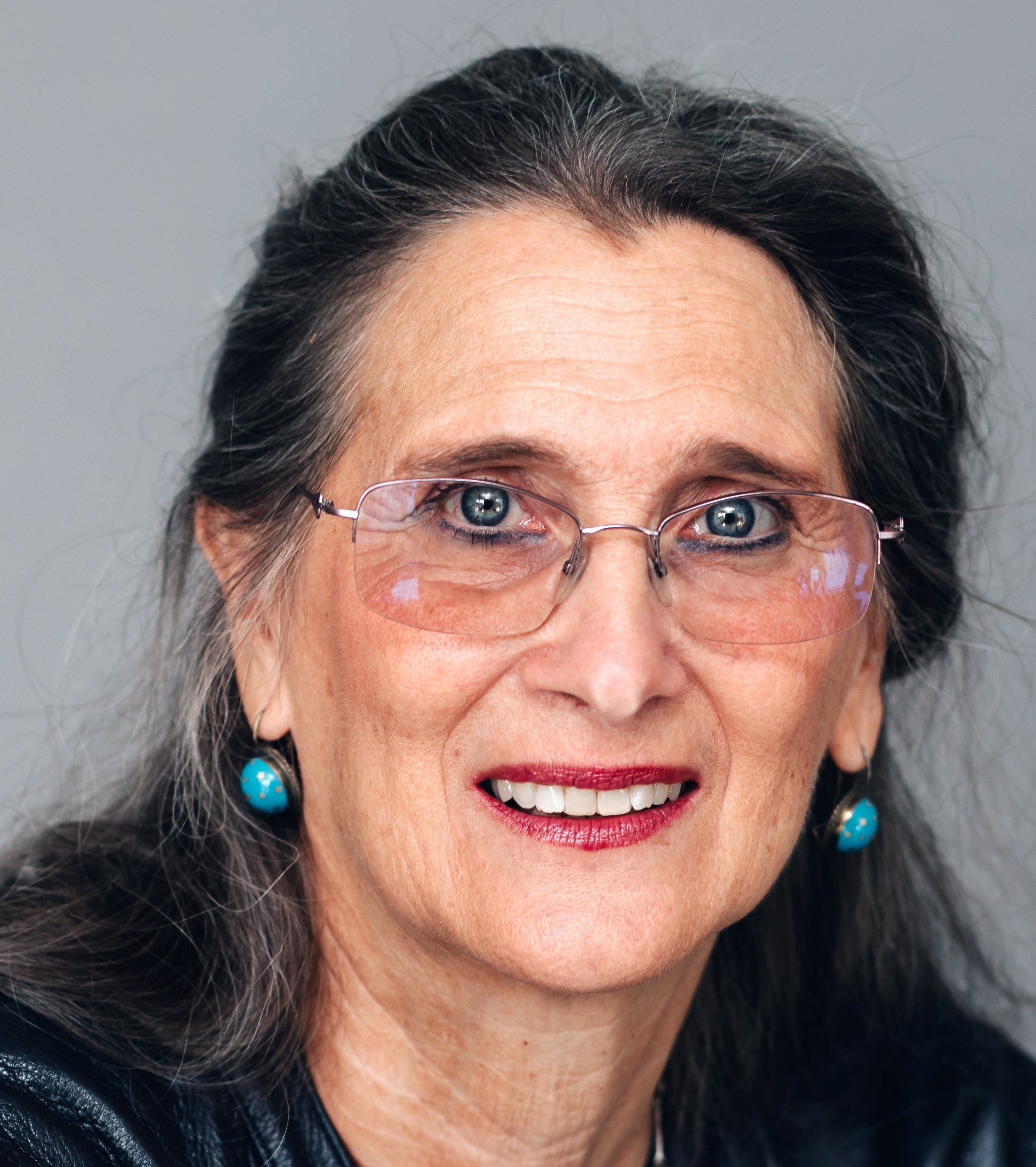
- Born: 10 April; Brooklyn, New York, U.S
- Citizenship: American and Ireland
- Education: MPA, public administration, Harvard University MALS from Graduate Faculty of Political and Social Science, The New School
- Occupation: CEO of beCause Global Consulting
- Spouse: Gerald ‘Jerry’ Dunfey
- Website: because.net

Nadine B. Hack is a dual citizen of America and Ireland, a business leader, writer and speaker. She has worked in government, the United Nations, academia, nonprofit organizations, and business. She is the CEO of beCause Global Consulting and senior advisor to Global Citizens Circle. She has served on many boards and advisory councils including currently for the Geneva Center for Business and Human Rights, The Pocket Project and she is the Switzerland chapter lead for the Harvard Kennedy School Women's Network.

== Early life and education ==
Hack grew up in Brooklyn, New York in the 1950s and attended Erasmus Hall High School. Hack completed two master's degrees, one in public administration from Harvard and the other from the Graduate Faculty of Political and Social Sciences from The New School. She is a Fellow of the Salzburg Global Seminar and a Fellow of New Westminster College Caucasus University.

== Career ==
=== Professional career ===
In the 1970s, Hack was a community organizer at Oakland Citizens Committee for Urban Renewal. (OCCUR) She was seconded to office of California Governor Jerry Brown and worked with his Secretary of Resources Huey Johnson as they developed a renewable resource initiative, Investing for Prosperity. She gave a TEDx ‘Adversaries to Allies’ describing the multi-sector process that supported this.

In the 1980s, Hack helped develop global green plans working with Wangari Maathai in Kenya founder of the Green Belt Movement, who later was the first African woman awarded the Nobel Peace Prize. Hack also was a consultant for nonprofits and progressive causes including the 1986 campaign of Corazon Aquino. She wrote a New York Times op-ed about supporting Philippines democracy.

In 1990, Hack was appointed to lead the Sister City Program by New York City Mayor David Dinkins. The next year, she became New York City Commissioner for the United Nations and Consular Corps until 1994.

In 2000, Hack was named Commissioner-General for the UN Pavilion at Expo in Hannover, Germany, by UN Secretary-General Kofi Annan. She remains involved in his Geneva-based global foundation.

From 2010 to 2102, she was the Executive-in-Residence at IMD Business School where she maintains an affiliation.

=== Political career ===
In 1964, Hack began political activism as a volunteer on Shirley Chisholm’s campaign for New York State Assembly. She also volunteered with Bella Abzug at Women Strike for Peace and was interviewed* for oral history book on her life championing women’s rights, including as a Congresswoman.

From the 1970s through the 1980s she organized and fundraised for candidates at the city, state, and federal level, including serving as the National co-chair and the New York State chair of the 1988 Democratic Presidential Victory Fund. During this same period, she and her husband Jerry Dunfey were active in the anti-apartheid movement.

In 1984, she was on the Democratic National Party’s Platform Committee with Geraldine Ferraro. Hack supported her 1978 congressional campaign and her 1984 Vice Presidential candidacy.

From 1987 to 1988, she was the National Co-chair and New York Chair of the Democratic Presidential Victory Fund and was a voting member of the Electoral College. In 1988, Michael S. Dukakis's Presidential fund-raising campaign in New York.

=== Academic career ===
Along with serving as Executive-in-Residence at IMD Business School, in recent years, she has been a guest lecturer at University of Lausanne and at École Polytechnique Fédérale de Lausanne EPFL and since the 1980s at New York University and universities around the world..

== Personal life ==
She married Jerry Dunfey, co-founder Omni Hotels & Resorts (né Dunfey Hotels) and founding president Global Citizens Circle. Through her marriage to Jerry, she is the stepmother of four adult children (predeceased by his eldest son Jerry Jr. They have six grandchildren.

== Awards and recognition ==
Hack was honored with:

- Named Top 100 Thought Leader Trustworthy Business Behaviour
- Enterprising Woman of the Year
- Inspiration Lifetime Achievement presented at Säid Business School
- Featured on Atlantic Speakers Bureau
