= List of commissioners offices of New York City =

This is a list of commissioners offices that head departments in New York City government. There are many other municipal government offices with the title of "commissioner" in New York City, and some departments are headed by individuals with a title other than commissioner. For instance, there are 13 commissioners on the New York City Planning Commission, a commissioner who oversees the Administration for Children's Services, and title of the head of the Law Department is called the Corporation Counsel, but only heads of New York City departments with the title of commissioner are included in the list below.

== List of commissioners ==
- Commissioner for the Aging
- Commissioner of Buildings
- Commissioner of Citywide Administrative Services - this department was formed by the merger Department of General Services and the Department of Personnel in 1996.
- Commissioner of Consumer Affairs - this department was formed by the merger of the Department of Licenses and the Department of Markets on September 10, 1968.
- Commissioner of Correction - this department was originally formed as part the Department of Public Charities and Correction in 1868. The two were separated in 1895.
- Commissioner of Cultural Affairs
- Commissioner of Design and Construction - this department was created in 1995.
- Commissioner of Docks and Ferries - this department was renamed the Department of Marine and Aviation on January 1, 1942.
- Commissioner of Emergency Management
- Commissioner of Environmental Protection
- Commissioner of Finance
- New York City Fire Commissioner
- New York City Commissioner of General Services - this department was merged with the Department of Personnel to form the Department of Citywide Administrative Services in 1996.
- Commissioner of Health
- Commissioner of Homeless Services - this department was created from the Department of Social Services in 1993.
- Commissioner of Information Technology and Telecommunications
- Commissioner of Investigation
- Commissioner of Juvenile Justice - this department was repealed.
- Commissioner of Licenses - this department was merged with the Department of Markets to form the Department of Consumer Affairs on September 10, 1968.
- Commissioner of Marine and Aviation - this department was repealed.
- Commissioner of Markets - this department was originally named the Department of Public Markets, Weights, and Measures, and was merged with the Department of Licenses to form the Department of Consumer Affairs on September 10, 1968.
- Commissioner of Parks and Recreation
- Commissioner of Personnel - this department was merged with the Department of General Services to form the Department of Citywide Administrative Services in 1996.
- New York City Police Commissioner
- New York City Commissioner of Ports and Trade - this department was repealed.
- Commissioner of Public Charities - this department was originally formed as part the Department of Public Charities and Correction in 1868. The two were separated in 1895. It was renamed the Department of Welfare in 1920.
- Commissioner of Public Markets, Weights, and Measures - this department was renamed the Department of Markets, and later was merged with the Department of Licenses to form the Department of Consumer Affairs on September 10, 1968.
- New York City Commissioner of Records and Information Services
- New York City Commissioner of Sanitation
- New York City Commissioner of Social Services - this Department was renamed from the Department of Welfare in 1967, and split into the Department of Homeless Services and the Administration for Children's Services in 1993.
- New York City Commissioner of Small Business Services
- Commissioner of Transportation
- Commissioner of Veterans' Services
- New York City Commissioner of Welfare - this department was originally formed as the Department of Public Charities and Correction in 1868. The two were split in 1895. The Department Public Charities was renamed the Department of Welfare in 1920, which was renamed the Department of Social Services in 1967.
- New York City Commissioner of Youth and Community Development
