= 100 Gates Project =

Public art organization in New York City

The 100 Gates Project in New York City, New York is an art-based organization that was founded in 2014, by Natalie Raben under the umbrella of the Lower East Side Partnership. The 100 Gates Project began as an effort to help community revitalization in Manhattan. The mission of the project was to enhance the beauty of the neighborhoods by working exclusively with local artists and merchants to paint murals on the metal security gates of participating stores. In 2014, the project began creating murals on the Lower East Side and set out to paint a total of 100 security gates. As of 2016, the project has surpassed its name and is currently working towards creating over 100 more murals in East Harlem and Downtown Staten Island combined. Natalie Raben and Ayana Hosten currently run the project by reaching out to local artists and merchants.

== Artwork ==
Merchants are paired with artists to collaborate on an art piece that will be available for the public to view. The 100 Gates Project uses 50 local artists in each neighborhood to participate in the project. Mini-portfolios are created and presented to store merchants who then decide on an artist to collaborate with. The store merchant and artist meet and discuss potential ideas for the gate as a representative from the 100 Gates Project mediates the conversation. Artwork is based on what the merchant feels best represents the store and the community it is a part of. Once the final mock-up is agreed on between both the merchant and the artist, the creation of the mural occurs after business hours. Certain murals created by the 100 Gates Project try to exemplify what the store represents by including New York Skyscrapers in front and ethnic symbols, influences, or references in the background of the skyscrapers, while other gates include messages of positivity and vibrant colors.

== Funding ==
In 2014, the 100 Gates Project was originally funded by the Lower East Side Partnership as they searched for merchants and artists willing to participate in the program. In 2016, Tiger Beer approached the 100 Gates Project and became a partner in helping the organization reach its goal of 100 gates. After the 100 gate goal was met, in 2017 the New York City Department of Small Business granted the 100 Gates Project the Neighborhood 360 grant to expand the project from the Lower East Side to East Harlem and Downtown Staten Island.

== Other sources ==
- Hosten, Ayana (December 1, 2017). "Interview on the 100 Gates Project" (Interview). Interviewed by Amy Healy. New York.
