= Patricia Harris (disambiguation) =

Patricia Harris (born 1956) is the former Deputy Mayor of New York City.

Patricia Harris may also refer to:

- Patricia Roberts Harris (1924–1985), Carter Administration cabinet member
- Patricia Harris, in 2005 New Year Honours
- Pat Butcher a.k.a. Patricia Harris, character in EastEnders

== See also ==
- Pat Harris (disambiguation)
