= Suzanne Miles-Gustave =

American government official

Deputy Mayor of New York City for Health and Human Services
- In office March 14, 2025 – December 31, 2025
- Mayor: Eric Adams
- Preceded by: Anne Williams-Isom
- Succeeded by: Helen Arteaga Landaverde

Acting First Deputy Mayor of New York City
- In office March 14, 2025 – March 14, 2025
- Mayor: Eric Adams
- Preceded by: Maria Torres-Springer
- Succeeded by: Camille Joseph Varlack (interim); Randy Mastro

Suzanne E. Miles-Gustave is an American government official who served as New York City deputy mayor for health and human services from March to December 2025. She also served as acting first deputy mayor of New York City from the departure of former first deputy mayor Maria Torres-Springer in the evening on March 14, 2025 until the appointment of Camille Joseph Varlack as interim first deputy mayor later that same evening in accordance with Executive Order 46 that was issued and signed on January 13, 2025 by Mayor Eric Adams that automatically delegates the duties of first deputy mayor to the deputy mayor for health and human services if for any reason the position of first deputy mayor becomes vacant or the first deputy mayor is for any reason unable to perform the duties of first deputy mayor.
