= Herminia Palacio =

American nonprofit executive

Deputy Mayor of New York City for Health and Human Services
- In office 2016–2019
- Mayor: Bill de Blasio
- Preceded by: Lilliam Barrios-Paoli
- Succeeded by: Raul Perea-Henze

Personal details
- Children: 2
- Education: Barnard College (BA); Mount Sinai Medical School (MD); University of California, Berkeley (MPH)

Herminia Palacio is an American nonprofit executive who was formerly CEO of the Guttmacher Institute. She formerly served as Deputy Mayor of New York City for Health and Human Services under Bill de Blasio from 2016 to 2019.

== Biography ==
Palacio grew up in The Bronx, daughter of a Subway clerk and bus driver who came to the United States from Cuba. Her mother suffered a psychiatric break, which inspired her to become a doctor. She graduated from Barnard College in 1983 and received her M.D. from Mount Sinai Medical School in 1987 before completing her residency at the San Francisco General Hospital and practiced clinical medicine there during the height of the HIV pandemic. Palacio worked in the city's HIV clinics and received her master's degree from the UC Berkeley School of Public Health, where she focused on the problem of HIV among women.

Palacio was co-investigator of the Connie Wofsy Women's HIV Study, which was the largest and longest-duration cohort study of HIV infection in women in the U.S., led by Professor Ruth Greenblatt at the University of California, San Francisco. She was also Senior Policy Advisor for the San Francisco Department of Public Health.

Palacio then moved to Texas and became Executive Director of Public Health and Environmental Services for Harris County, Texas, where she had to respond to the H1N1 influenza and public health hazards in the aftermath of the Hurricane Katrina. During her tenure, the city sheltered and treated some 27,000 Hurricane Katrina evacuees in the Houston Astrodome. In 2007, she received the Excellence in Health Administration Award by the American Public Health Association for her work during the Katrina crisis, during which she presided oversaw all public health operations of the megashelter and managed thousands of physicians and nurses who cared for the storm victims. While in Texas, she concurrently served as an adjunct professor at the Baylor College of Medicine and the University of Texas School of Public Health.

In 2011, Palacio was appointed by Barack Obama to serve on the Advisory Group on Prevention, Health Promotion, and Integrative and Public Health.

She spent three years directing health leadership programs at the Robert Wood Johnson Foundation before being appointed to Deputy Mayor of New York City under Bill de Blasio in 2016. Her work focused on addressing the city's homeless population and developing a citywide network for mental health support. As deputy mayor, she helped roll out NYC Care, an enhanced citywide health care initiative that guarantees low-cost and no-cost services through the city’s public hospitals to people who do not qualify for, or cannot afford healthcare insurance. Her term ended with her appointment to CEO of the Guttmacher Institute in 2019. She became CEO in August 2019.

Palacio was elected a trustee of the City University of New York in 2021.

== Personal life and family ==
Palacio lives in Manhattan.
