= Matthew W. Daus =

American politician

Matthew W. Daus is an American politician who served as the tenth Commissioner and Chairman of the New York City Taxi and Limousine Commission (TLC). He is now a partner and chair of transportation at the law-firm Windels, Marx, Lane, & Mittendorf LLP. He also serves as the Transportation Technology Chair and distinguished lecturer at The City University of New York's Transportation Research Center, Commissioner of the New York City Civil Service Commission, and President of the International Association of Transportation Regulators.

== Education ==
Daus completed his undergraduate studies at Brooklyn College before receiving a Juris Doctor degree from the Touro Law Center in 1992.

== New York City government roles ==
Daus entered into civil service in 1994 when Mayor Rudy Giuliani appointed him a prosecutor for the New York City Commission on Human Rights. In 2001 during Giuliani's final year as Mayor, Daus was appointed Commissioner and Chairman of the New York City Taxi and Limousine Commission.

Two years later, New York City Mayor Michael Bloomberg reappointed Daus to his position of Commissioner of the TLC. During his time as Commissioner, Daus is most noted for embracing technology to make Taxicabs of New York City safer and more efficient by requiring installation of Global Positioning System software and credit/debit payment options in all New York City Taxis. He encouraged the use of hybrid taxicabs, which comprised over 23% of the fleet in 2010, and the establishment of an Accessible Taxi Dispatch System to serve passengers with disabilities. Daus eventually resigned as commissioner in 2010 earning praise from Bloomberg of a "fantastic job" done while Commissioner. The almost nine years as the top officer of the TLC makes Daus the longest tenured Commissioner in the history of the organization.

Preceded by	New York City; Taxi and Limousine Commission; Commissioner; 2001–2010	Succeeded by David Yassky
