= Michael A. Livermore =

American legal scholar

Michael A. Livermore is an American legal scholar who is a Professor of Law at the University of Virginia School of Law. His research and teaching focus on environmental law, administrative law, regulatory law and policy, and the application of computational methods to legal analysis.

Livermore is particularly known for his work on cost-benefit analysis in environmental and health regulation, and on the use of data science and artificial intelligence in legal scholarship.

== Education and early career ==
Livermore earned his Juris Doctor (J.D.) from New York University School of Law, where he was a Furman Scholar, elected to the Order of the Coif, and served as a managing editor of the NYU Law Review. Following law school, he served as a judicial clerk for Judge Harry T. Edwards on the U.S. Court of Appeals for the D.C. Circuit.

Livermore was the founding Executive Director of the Institute for Policy Integrity at New York University School of Law. This think tank is dedicated to improving government decision-making through advocacy and scholarship related to administrative law and cost-benefit analysis.

== Academic career and research ==
Livermore joined the faculty at the University of Virginia School of Law in 2013. His scholarship often involves collaborations with researchers in fields such as economics, computer science, neurology, and the humanities. His work has appeared in leading law journals, as well as in peer-reviewed scientific and social science journals. He is a past Fellow at the Paris Institute for Advanced Study (Paris IAS).

His primary research interests include:

- Cost-Benefit Analysis: Livermore is an expert on the use of cost-benefit analysis in evaluating environmental and other government regulations. He co-authored the book Retaking Rationality: How Cost-Benefit Analysis Can Better Protect the Environment and Our Health (Oxford University Press, 2008) with Richard L. Revesz, and later Reviving Rationality: Saving Cost-Benefit Analysis for the Sake of the Environment and Our Health (Oxford University Press, 2020) with Revesz. He also co-edited The Globalization of Cost-Benefit Analysis in Environmental Policy.
- Computational Legal Analysis: He conducts interdisciplinary work applying computational methods, data science, and artificial intelligence to legal texts and reasoning. He is the co-editor of Law as Data: Computation, Text, and the Future of Legal Analysis (Santa Fe Institute Press, 2019) with Daniel N. Rockmore.

== Selected publications ==
- Revesz, Richard L., and Michael A. Livermore. Retaking Rationality: How Cost-Benefit Analysis Can Better Protect the Environment and Our Health. Oxford University Press, 2008.
- Livermore, Michael A., and Richard L. Revesz. The Globalization of Cost-Benefit Analysis in Environmental Policy. Oxford University Press, 2013.
- Livermore, Michael A., and Daniel N. Rockmore, eds. Law as Data: Computation, Text, and the Future of Legal Analysis. Santa Fe Institute Press, 2019.
- Revesz, Richard L., and Michael A. Livermore. Reviving Rationality: Saving Cost-Benefit Analysis for the Sake of the Environment and Our Health. Oxford University Press, 2020.
