= Pat Harris =

Pat or Patrick Harris may refer to:

- Neil Patrick Harris (born 1973), American actor
- Pat Harris (footballer), New Zealand footballer
- Patrick Harris (1934–2020), retired Church of England bishop
- Patrick Harris (field hockey), American indoor and field hockey player
- Captain Pat Harris, character in A Fall of Moondust
- Pat Harris, character in Life for Ruth
- Pat Butcher a.k.a. Pat Harris, a fictional character in the BBC soap opera EastEnders
- Patrick Harris, Democratic candidate for the 2025 Arizona's 7th congressional district special election

== See also ==
- Patricia Harris (disambiguation)
