= Elle Bisgaard-Church =

American political adviser

Chief of Staff to the Mayor of New York City
- Incumbent
- Assumed office January 1, 2026
- Mayor: Zohran Mamdani
- Preceded by: Camille Joseph Varlack

Personal details
- Born: June 28, 1991 (age 35) California, U.S.
- Party: Democratic
- Other political affiliations: Democratic Socialists of America
- Education: Swarthmore College (BA); Columbia University (MPA); London School of Economics (MPA)

Elliana Bisgaard-Church (born June 28, 1991) is an American political adviser who has served as chief of staff to New York City Mayor Zohran Mamdani since 2026. A member of the Democratic Socialists of America (DSA), Bisgaard-Church was also the campaign manager for Mamdani's 2025 New York City Democratic mayoral primary campaign.

== Early life and education ==
Bisgaard-Church was born June 28, 1991 in California and grew up as the only child of a single mother. During her childhood, she regularly volunteered at a homeless shelter. She was raised in Davis, California and graduated from Davis High School.

She attended Swarthmore College in Pennsylvania, where she produced an anti-war radio show on WSRN-FM. After graduating, she worked for charities and held non-profit jobs in Philadelphia and Washington, D.C., focusing on adult literacy and decarceration. She moved to New York City in 2016 for a public affairs fellowship with Coro.

Bisgaard-Church completed a dual M.P.A. from the Columbia University School of International and Public Affairs and the London School of Economics. She chose to study taxation, stating, "if I'm interested in critiquing and reforming our system of taxation, I better go study formally what a tax is."

== Career ==
=== New York State Assembly chief of staff ===
Bisgaard-Church was new to politics and had little policy experience when she was hired by Zohran Mamdani just after graduate school. She was unknown to Mamdani when she applied in the fall of 2020 for the chief of staff role. Her hiring process involved four interview rounds, including with the New York City Democratic Socialists of America, and the Muslim Democratic Club of New York.

Bisgaard-Church served as Mamdani's chief of staff in the New York State Assembly from December 2020 to December 2024. During her time in Albany, she was reportedly "not on the scene" and avoided "schmoozing." She is said to have "quickly proved to be a skilled political operator with a knack for coalition building." Her tenure has been described as part of an "evolution from a confrontational activist approach to a deft inside/outside strategy." State senator Jabari Brisport called her an "incredible workhorse."

She was one of the "leading voices" in the successful push for higher taxes on wealthy residents during the COVID-19 pandemic. In 2021, she played a key role in the campaign for taxi driver debt relief, organizing a letter to the mayor and coordinating elected officials who were arrested during protests. She also helped start a free bus pilot scheme in 2023, proposing the idea for Mamdani to use a dinner with Mayor Eric Adams to finalize the pilot's approval. The pilot was later not renewed. Politico New York reported this was due to Mamdani's planned protest vote against the April 2024 state budget, a claim Mamdani denied. Bisgaard-Church noted that advocacy for the program continued.

=== 2025 Mayoral campaign ===
Bisgaard-Church served as the campaign manager for Zohran Mamdani's 2025 New York City Democratic mayoral primary campaign, the first political campaign she had ever managed. The campaign has been described as the "best-run mayoral campaign in recent history" and "one of the most improbable, closely-watched and successful campaigns in recent political history."

Bisgaard-Church is credited with crafting the campaign's platform. She stated the strategy was grounded on "consistency, clarity, authenticity" and focused on affordability, with tentpoles of a rent freeze, free buses, and universal childcare. She also developed the "Department of Community Safety," a central campaign proposal, after researching by interviewing mental health experts, public safety bureaucrats, and former New York City Police Department chief Rodney K. Harrison.

Under her management, Mamdani won the Democratic primary with a 13-point lead over Andrew Cuomo.

Bisgaard-Church is described as Mamdani's "right hand" and "closest adviser." Mamdani singled her out for praise during his victory speech, stating, "I would not have won this race without her steering our campaign." Patrick Gaspard, an informal adviser, called her the campaign's "boiler room" and "easily the most influential voice, partner, strategist in the camp." NYC-DSA Co-Chair Gustavo Gordillo stated, "With Zohran, she is the brains of the campaign."

=== Mayoral transition ===
Following the primary, Bisgaard-Church's title changed to chief adviser. She is responsible for "laying the groundwork for a mayoral administration," overseeing a "hiring spree," and leading the transition effort. Her role includes "vetting potential deputy mayors, agency heads, timelines and policies." Her planning also focuses on "co-governance" and includes a standing weekly meeting with leaders of the NYC-DSA. On November 10, Mamdani announced she would serve as chief of staff in his mayoral administration.

== Political positions ==
Bisgaard-Church is a member of the Democratic Socialists of America (DSA). Prior to working for Mamdani, she was a "paper member," meaning she was not deeply involved. She later took part in creating the DSA's legislative analysis team and wrote a guiding document in 2021 that defined how the DSA would interact with its elected officials. She also played a key role in convincing the DSA to endorse Mamdani for mayor.

Sources describe her as a "diehard believer" on the left with a "lifelong preoccupation with wealth inequality, the carceral system and the injustices of war." Bisgaard-Church has stated she feels "deeply ashamed" of homelessness, calling it a "political choice" and a "moral failure," and said she found a "shared sense of rage" about it within the NYC-DSA.

== Personal life ==
Bisgaard-Church's full name is Elliana Bisgaard-Church. She had a wedding in July 2025. She maintains a low public profile, rarely gives interviews, and does not have a traceable presence on X.

Civic offices
Preceded by Camille Joseph Varlack	Chief of Staff to the Mayor of New York City; 2026–present	Incumbent
