= Leila Bozorg =

American public servant

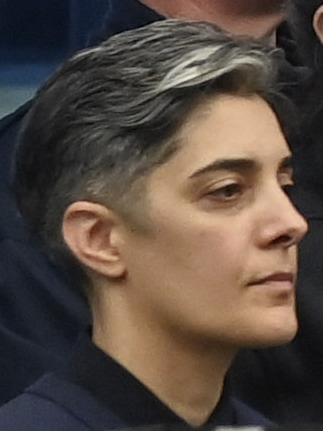
- Bozorg in 2026

Deputy Mayor of New York City for Housing and Planning
- Incumbent
- Assumed office January 1, 2026
- Mayor: Zohran Mamdani
- Preceded by: Adolfo Carrión Jr. (as deputy mayor for housing, economic development, and workforce)

Personal details
- Born: 1982 or 1983 (age 43–44) Amherst, Massachusetts, USA
- Spouse: Molly Beth Gaebe (m. 2023)
- Education: Wesleyan University (BA); Massachusetts Institute of Technology (MCP)

Leila Bozorg (born 1982 or 1983) is American urban planner and government official specializing in housing policy. In December 2025, New York City mayor-elect Zohran Mamdani appointed her as the deputy mayor for Housing and Planning. Bozorg has served in senior housing roles at the city and federal levels, including as the executive director for Housing under mayor Eric Adams and within the U.S. Department of Housing and Urban Development (HUD) during the Obama administration.

== Early life and education ==
Bozorg was born in 1982 or 1983 to parents who arrived in the United States following the Iranian Revolution. She grew up in Amherst, Massachusetts and later attended Wesleyan University, graduating in 2004 with a bachelor's degree in government studies. She earned a master's degree in city planning from the Massachusetts Institute of Technology (MIT).

== Career ==
Bozorg worked for four years at the U.S. Department of Housing and Urban Development (HUD) during the Obama administration. While at HUD, she worked on a program designed to raise funds for public housing by shifting management to private developers.

Bozorg spent six years in various positions at the New York City Department of Housing Preservation and Development (HPD). As of 2017, she served as the agency's chief of staff.

Bozorg subsequently served as a commissioner on the New York City Planning Commission. She also worked as the chief of strategy and policy for NYC Kids RISE, a nonprofit organization.

In January 2024, Bozorg was appointed as New York City's Executive Director for Housing under mayor Eric Adams. In this capacity, she played a role on a committee that proposed several ballot measures intended to accelerate housing construction.

On December 19, 2025, mayor-elect Zohran Mamdani announced Bozorg's appointment as the deputy mayor for Housing and Planning, a role that he shifted somewhat since Maria Torres-Springer served in that capacity under Mayor Eric Adams. At the time of her appointment, she was described as having 15 years of experience in senior-level housing policymaking.

== Personal life ==
Bozorg has resided in the Fort Greene neighborhood.

She met Molly Beth Gaebe at a wedding for a former college softball teammate of Gaebe's in Stonington, Connecticut, in October 2018. In 2020, Bozorg purchased a weekend home in Big Indian, New York. Following a proposal during Hurricane Henri, she married Gaebe on June 24, 2023, at the Full Moon Resort in Big Indian. The wedding ceremony incorporated Persian traditions, including a Sofreh Aghd.
