= Institute for Policy Integrity =

Think Tank

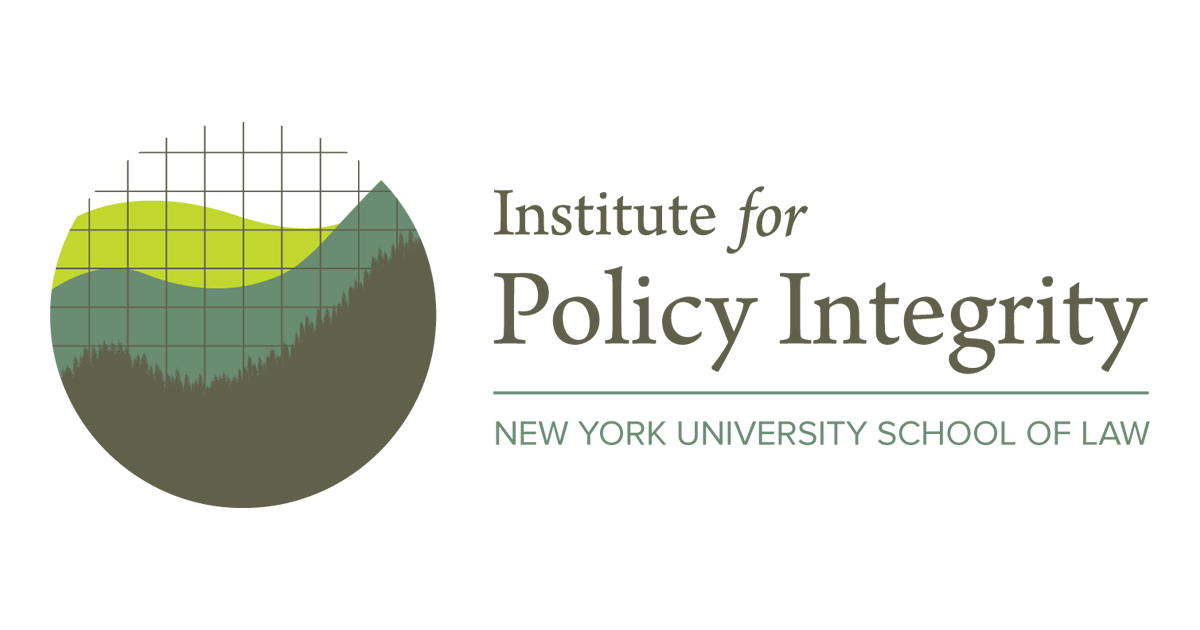
- Founded: 2008; 18 years ago
- Founders: Richard Revesz, Michael A. Livermore
- Type: non-profit
- Purpose: Environment, energy, public health, regulatory policy, law, economics
- Location: New York City, United States
- Website: policyintegrity.org

The Institute for Policy Integrity (“Policy Integrity”) is a non-partisan think tank housed within the New York University School of Law. Policy Integrity is dedicated to improving government decisionmaking, primarily focusing on climate and energy policy. Policy Integrity produces original scholarly research and advocates for reform before courts, legislatures, and executive agencies at both the federal and state level.

== Overview and history ==
The Institute for Policy Integrity was founded in 2008 by Richard Revesz and Michael A. Livermore to pursue research and advocacy related to the principles outlined in their book, Retaking Rationality: How Cost-Benefit Analysis Can Better Protect the Environment and Our Health. Policy Integrity advocates for the use of cost-benefit analysis in designing regulations on energy and climate issues, consumer protection, and public health.

Policy Integrity submits amicus briefs, public comments, and expert testimony in court cases and legal proceedings. A staff of roughly 25 lawyers, economists, and other staff members regularly author reports, policy briefs, academic articles, and op-eds.

Poicy Integrity is led by Richard Revesz, the AnBryce Professor of Law and Dean Emeritus at NYU Law School. Revesz took a temporary leave of absence in 2023-2025 to serve as administrator of the White House Office of Information and Regulatory Affairs. The executive director is Don Goodson.

== Ongoing work ==
Policy Integrity has consistently supported the use of the Social Cost of Carbon (SCC) to monetize and weigh the impacts of carbon pollution. The institute frequently collaborates with non-governmental organizations to advocate for the proper application of SCC metrics in federal agency regulatory impact analyses and environmental reviews, as well as in relevant and state policymaking processes.

Policy Integrity regularly engages in research and advocacy on electricity policy. The institute has published reports on issues related to transmission, grid resilience, and the deployment and compensation of distributed energy resources. It has also engaged in state energy policy proceedings around the country and advocated before the Federal Energy Regulatory Commission and the Department of Energy.

Policy Integrity has been involved in efforts to reform federal natural resource leasing programs. It frequently participates in Department of the Interior regulatory proceedings, pushing for proper consideration of climate impacts and alternate use options for public lands, such as recreation, conservation, and renewable energy production.

In 2018, Policy Integrity launched a resource tracking the outcomes of legal challenges to Trump administration policy changes. The New York Times, The Washington Post, The Wall Street Journal, and several other publications have regularly cited the resource.

Policy Integrity has also produced extensive research and advocacy related to federal vehicle emissions standards, deregulation during the COVID-19 pandemic, healthcare protections, and other policy issues.

== Role in litigation ==
Policy Integrity has helped support several major environmental rules that have faced challenges in federal courts, including the U.S. Supreme Court. Its amicus briefs have garnered attention in cases including:

- Utility Air Regulatory Group v. EPA, which upheld the ability of the EPA to regulate greenhouse gas emissions under the Clean Air Act.
- Michigan v. EPA, which held that the EPA must consider costs when deciding whether to regulate.
- EPA v. EME Homer City Generation, which upheld key aspects of the EPA’s Cross-State Air Pollution Rule.

Policy Integrity has filed numerous other amicus briefs in federal cases on energy efficiency standards, conservation designations, pipeline impacts, and methane emission regulation, among other issues.
