= Robert J. Milano =

American industrialist (1912–2000)

Deputy mayor of New York City for economic development
- In office January – March 1978
- Preceded by: Herman Badillo
- Succeeded by: Basil Paterson

Personal details
- Born: June 14, 1912 New York City, U.S.
- Died: January 29, 2000 (aged 87)
- Education: City College

Military service
- Allegiance: United States
- Battles/wars: World War II

Robert J. Milano (June 14, 1912 – January 29, 2000) was an American industrialist. He was the founder and chairman of Millmaster Onyx, and also briefly served as deputy mayor of New York City during the Koch administration.

== Early life and education ==
Milano was born in New York City on June 14, 1912, and grew up in the Hell's Kitchen neighborhood of Manhattan. After attending the High School of Commerce, he studied business administration and financial law at City College.

== Career ==
He founded Millmaster Chemical Company in 1936, and after serving in the military during World War II, returned to lead the company through a period of growth. In the 1980s, he sold the company, by then called Millmaster Onyx Corporation, to the Gulf Oil Company. He was a trustee of the Chemist Club and president of the Salesman Association of the American Chemical Industry.

In 1971, he was appointed by Governor Rockefeller to the Scott Commission, which was investigating the city's fiscal policies, and also served on the State Charter Revision Commission for New York City. In January 1978, Mayor Koch introduced him as the deputy mayor for economic development and head of the Economic Development Corporation. Less than three months later, however, Milano left the administration.

He joined the New School's board in 1976, serving as a trustee and later vice-chairman.

== Death and legacy ==
He died on January 29, 2000.

In 1996, the trustees of the university renamed the Center for New York City Affairs (also known as the Kaplan Center), of which he had been a member of the advisory board, as the Robert J. Milano Graduate School of Management and Urban Policy (now the Milano School of International Affairs, Management and Urban Policy) in his honor.
