= Aravind Joshi =

American linguist (1929–2017)

Aravind Krishna Joshi
- Born: August 5, 1929; Poona, Bombay Presidency, British India (present-day Pune, Maharashtra, India)
- Died: December 31, 2017 (aged 88)
- Education: College of Engineering, Pune; Indian Institute of Science; University of Pennsylvania
- Known for: Defining the tree-adjoining grammar formalism
- Relatives: Meera Joshi (daughter)
- Scientific career
- Fields: Computational linguistics
- Workplaces: University of Pennsylvania
- Thesis: Some Applications of Information Theory and a Generalization of Normalized Entropy (1960)
- Doctoral advisor: Seymour Sherman
- Doctoral students: S. Rao Kosaraju; Kathleen McKeown; Jerry Kaplan; Marilyn Walker

Aravind Krishna Joshi (August 5, 1929 – December 31, 2017) was the Henry Salvatori Professor of Computer and Cognitive Science in the computer science department of the University of Pennsylvania. Joshi defined the tree-adjoining grammar formalism which is often used in computational linguistics and natural language processing.

Joshi studied at Pune University and the Indian Institute of Science, where he was awarded a BE in electrical engineering and a DIISc in communication engineering respectively. Joshi's graduate work was done in the electrical engineering department at the University of Pennsylvania, and he was awarded his PhD in 1960. He became a professor at Penn and was the co-founder and co-director of the Institute for Research in Cognitive Science.

== Awards and recognitions ==
- Guggenheim fellow, 1971–72
- Fellow of the Institute of Electrical and Electronics Engineers (IEEE), 1976
- Best Paper Award at the National Conference on Artificial Intelligence, 1987
- Founding Fellow of the American Association for Artificial Intelligence (AAAI), 1990
- IJCAI Award for Research Excellence, 1997
- Fellow of the Association for Computing Machinery, 1998
- Elected to the National Academy of Engineering, 1999
- First to be awarded the Association for Computational Linguistics Lifetime Achievement Award at the 40th anniversary meeting of the ACL, 2002
- Awarded the Rumelhart Prize, 2003
- Benjamin Franklin Medal in Computer and Cognitive Science, 2005
- Doctor honoris causa of mathematical and physical sciences, Charles University in Prague, October 30, 2013
- S.-Y. Kuroda Prize of the SIG Mathematics of Language of the ACL, 2013

=== Awarded history ===
On April 21, 2005, Joshi was awarded the Franklin Institute's Benjamin Franklin Medal in Computer and Cognitive Science. The Franklin Institute citation states that he was awarded the medal "for his fundamental contributions to our understanding of how language is represented in the mind, and for developing techniques that enable computers to process efficiently the wide range of human languages. These advances have led to new methods for computer translation."

| Preceded by Richard M. Karp | Benjamin Franklin Medal in Computer and Cognitive Science; 2005 | Succeeded by Donald Norman |

| Preceded by None | ACL Lifetime Achievement Award; 2002 | Succeeded by Makoto Nagao |
