= Felix Storch, Inc =

American appliance company

Felix Storch, Inc.
- Type: Private
- Industry: Appliances
- Founded: 1969 in Long Island City, New York City, United States
- Founder: Felix Storch
- Headquarters: Bronx, New York City, United States
- Brands: Summit Appliance; Accucold
- Number of employees: 150-200
- Website: felixstorchinc.com

Felix Storch, Inc. (FSI) is an American appliance company based in the Bronx, New York. Founded in 1969, the company specializes in specialty and compact appliances for residential, commercial, medical, and scientific applications. Its products are primarily marketed under the Summit Appliance and Accucold brands.

== History ==
They trademarked the Summit Appliance brand name in their first year, and began their distribution in Long Island City, New York. In 1983, needing additional room for expansion, they moved their headquarters and operations to the Bronx. In 1998 they purchased their current HQ building in the Bronx, where their manufacturing, operations, back office, and distribution are all located. To accommodate Felix Storch, Inc.'s continued growth, in the 2008-2009 period they added state-of-the-art warehouse facilities in Edison, New Jersey, and purchased a building in Wallingford, Connecticut, housing their fabrication facility, bringing their total property for product development, manufacturing, and warehousing to nearly 300,000 square feet. Their products now include a wide range of major appliances sold both nationally and internationally and delivered to the Northeastern United States using their own FSI trucks.

== Brands ==
FSI owns several brand trademarks that focus on different areas of specialty appliance use:

- Summit Appliance, residential and commercial appliances
- Accucold, medical and life science cold storage equipment
- Wattsipper, 120V cooking products
- Dreambilt, luxury undercounter refrigeration
- Momcube, breast milk refrigerators & freezers
