= Helen Arteaga Landaverde =

Ecuadorian-American public health administrator

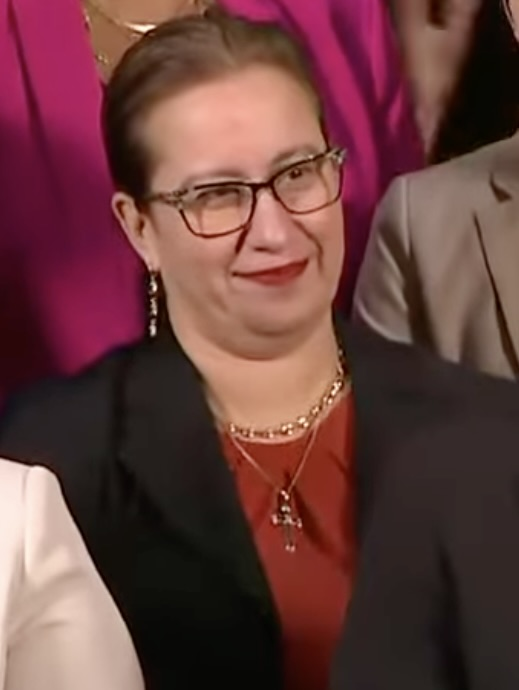
- Arteaga Landaverde in 2026.

Deputy Mayor of New York City for Health and Human Services
- Incumbent
- Assumed office January 1, 2026
- Mayor: Zohran Mamdani
- Preceded by: Suzanne Miles-Gustave

Personal details
- Born: 1976 or 1977 (age 49–50) United States
- Children: 3
- Education: New York University (BA); Columbia University (MPH); CUNY Graduate School of Public Health and Health Policy (DPH)

Helen J. Arteaga Landaverde (born 1976 or 1977) is an Ecuadorian-American public health administrator and government official. She served as the first female and first Hispanic chief executive officer of NYC Health + Hospitals/Elmhurst. In December 2025, she was appointed deputy mayor for Health and Human Services for New York City by Mayor-elect Zohran Mamdani.

== Early life and education ==
Arteaga Landaverde was born 1976 or 1977 in the United States to Luis and Liliana Alava and raised in Ecuador, eventually returning at a young age to the United States with her family. She speaks fluent Spanish and is a longtime resident of Corona, Queens. She is a lifelong member of the Our Lady of Sorrows Catholic Church in Corona, where she graduated from its academy.

Arteaga Landaverde attended New York University (NYU) on a scholarship, where she majored in chemistry. During her sophomore year at New York University, her father, Luis, died following a diagnosis of leukemia. He was a community activist in Corona who had worked with local clergy to address gang violence in the neighborhood. This event prompted her to shift her career focus from chemistry to public health. She went on to earn a Master of Public Health from Columbia University Mailman School of Public Health. On June 27, 2023, she received a Doctor of Public Health from the CUNY Graduate School of Public Health and Health Policy, with a concentration in Community Health and Health Policy. Her doctoral committee was chaired by Christopher Palmedo. Her dissertation, titled "Understanding Influenza Vaccine Hesitancy And Uptake Among U.S. Hispanic Adults During The Covid-19 Pandemic," was dedicated to her grandmother, Luz, whom she described as her "first women leader."

== Career ==
Arteaga Landaverde held positions within the Northwell Health. She subsequently spent 15 years with Urban Health Plan, a system of community health centers, eventually serving as the assistant vice president of the Queens Network and Executive Initiatives starting in 2015. Inspired by her father's memory, she co-founded the Plaza del Sol Family Health Center. In this Plaza it has provided for more than 27,000 patients making sure everyone gets the care despite finically. In March 2016, she was appointed to the Board of Directors for both NYC Health + Hospitals and the NYU Alumni. During her career, she received a fellowship with the National Hispana Leadership Institute.

On February 8, 2021, Arteaga Landaverde became the chief executive officer of NYC Health + Hospitals/Elmhurst. Her appointment made her the first woman and the first Hispanic person to lead the hospital. While she was a CEO, she brought in $3 million from the borough president's office to help the maternal and neonatal units of the hospital. During her tenure, U.S. News & World Report named Elmhurst one of the "Best Regional Hospitals" and "Highest Performing" in the United States, in addition City & State NY as "Top Places to Work". Additionally, in September 2023, the Joint Commission recognized the hospital as the first in New York State to achieve a Health Equity Gold standard certification.

On December 30, 2025, during a press conference held at Elmhurst Hospital, Mayor-elect Zohran Mamdani announced Arteaga Landaverde's appointment as deputy mayor for Health and Human Services. In this role, succeeding Suzanne Miles-Gustave, she is responsible for overseeing the city's health, mental health, social, and homelessness services.

At a June 4, 2026 ceremony to recognize the efforts of the Richmond University Medical Center after an explosion at May Ship Repair on Richmond Terrace, Arteaga Landaverde presented the hospital with a citation on behalf of Mayor Zohran Mamdani.

== Personal life ==
Arteaga Landaverde is married to Victor, and the couple has three children. In 2020, prior to becoming CEO of the facility, Arteaga Landaverde was admitted to Elmhurst Hospital with a severe case of COVID-19. She nearly died from the disease and credits the hospital staff with saving her life.

Civic offices
Preceded by Suzanne Miles-Gustave	Deputy Mayor for Health and Human Services; 2026–present	Incumbent
