= NYC Commission on Government Efficiency =

Commission on Government Efficiency (COGE) is a New York City government commission created by Mayor Zohran Mamdani in May 2026 to modernize government, identify waste, and reduce government expenditures.

== Background ==
The commission was announced on May 28, 2026, in a X (social network) post, with Mamdani writing, "The Commission on Government Efficiency will take a hard look at how city government functions and identify the reforms we need to deliver faster, smarter and more effectively for working people".

The commission will be led by former US Ambassador to South Africa Patrick Gaspard. Mamdani proposed selecting Ann Cheng as the body's executive director. The body plans to hold 10 public meetings in 2026, with proposals presented to voters in November 2026.

In July 2026, the Commission released its preliminary report, based on its first seven public hearings, which drew more than 780 attendees, 178 speakers, and 345 written submissions from the public. The report identifies four areas for potential Charter reform: accelerating access to public space and infrastructure, accelerating permitting and contracting, modernizing outdated systems and requirements, and ensuring the city's fiscal stability.

== Recommendations ==
The commission has made a number of recommendations including:

- simplification of the process to secure permits for outdoor dining
- reduction of the city government's procurement and contracting procedures
- fast-tracking of projects on land owned by the city government, irrespective of whether it is for a street or a building
- simplification of the procedure to secure building permits
- establishment of targets for contributions to the city government's rainy day fund to prepare for a potential future recession

== Members ==
- Ann Cheng
- Marco Carrion
- Henry Garrido
- Susan Kang
- Kapil Longani
- Ruth Messinger
- Thomas Moore
- Ana Oliveira
- Dawn Pinnock
- Carlina Rivera
- Esther Rosario
- Marc Shaw
- Barika Williams
- Emma Wolfe
- Kathryn Wylde

== See also ==
- Department of Government Efficiency (DOGE)
