= Richard Revesz =

American lawyer (born 1958)

Ricky Revesz
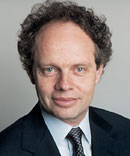

Administrator of the Office of Information and Regulatory Affairs
- In office January 2023 – January 20, 2025
- President: Joe Biden
- Preceded by: Dom Mancini (acting)
- Succeeded by: Dom Mancini (acting)

Personal details
- Born: May 9, 1958 (age 68) Buenos Aires, Argentina
- Party: Democratic
- Spouse: Vicki Been
- Children: 2
- Education: Princeton University (BS); Massachusetts Institute of Technology (MS); Yale University (JD)

Richard L. Revesz (/rəˈvɛz/ rə-VEZ; born May 9, 1958) is an American lawyer and academic. He is the AnBryce Professor of Law and faculty director of the Institute for Policy Integrity at the New York University School of Law. From 2023 to 2025, he served as the administrator of the Office of Information and Regulatory Affairs in the Biden administration. He served as dean of the New York University School of Law from 2002 to 2013, and as the director of the American Law Institute from 2014 to 2023.

== Early life and education ==
Born in Buenos Aires, Argentina, Richard Revesz graduated summa cum laude with a B.S.E. in civil engineering from Princeton University in 1979, completing a senior thesis titled "Energy or Environment? The Tradeoff between Automobile Emissions and Fuel Economy." He then received an M.S. in civil engineering from the Massachusetts Institute of Technology. He continued his studies at Yale Law School, where he was editor-in-chief of Yale Law Journal and received a J.D. in 1983. Upon graduation, he clerked first for chief judge Wilfred Feinberg of the U.S. Court of Appeals for the Second Circuit and then for U.S. Supreme Court Justice Thurgood Marshall, where he met his wife, Vicki Been, who was also clerking at the Supreme Court, for Justice Harry Blackmun.

== Career ==
=== Early career ===
Revesz began his academic career in 1985, joining the faculty of NYU Law School as an assistant professor. By 1990, he was a full professor of law, teaching environmental and administrative law. In 2001, he was named Lawrence King professor of law and, a year later, he succeeded John Sexton as dean. He stepped down as dean in 2013. Revesz also has been a visiting professor at Princeton's Woodrow Wilson School of Public and International Affairs, Harvard Law School, Yale Law School, and the Graduate Institute of International Studies in Geneva, Switzerland.

=== NYU School of Law Dean ===
During Revesz's tenure as dean of NYU Law School, NYU raised over $500 million and attracted 46 new faculty members, including fellow Argentine-American academic Samuel Issacharoff. While dean, Revesz presided over various free-speech controversies: he criticized but did not discipline a student who asked Justice Antonin Scalia about his sex life, and defended Singaporean jurist Thio Li-ann's right to express controversial views about criminalizing consensual sexual acts between men.

=== American Law Institute Director ===
In 2014, Revesz was appointed as the director of the American Law Institute. He oversees the institute's publication of Restatements of the Law, Principles of the Law, model acts, and other proposals for law reform.

=== Institute for Policy Integrity Director ===
In 2008, Revesz and Michael A. Livermore co-founded the Institute for Policy Integrity, a NYU Law-affiliated think tank and advocacy organization dedicated to improving the quality of governmental decision-making. Revesz directs the institute, which contributes original research in economics, administrative law, and public policy, and advocates for reform before courts, legislatures, and executive agencies. The institute’s work focuses primarily on energy and climate issues, consumer protection, and public health.

=== Scholarship ===
Revesz has published numerous books and articles in major law reviews and journals, focusing on federalism and environmental regulation, the design of liability rules for environmental protection, and the role of cost-benefit analysis in shaping administrative and environmental regulation. His most recent book, Reviving Rationality: Saving Cost-Benefit Analysis for the Sake of the Environment and Our Health, which he co-wrote with Livermore, argues that the Trump administration destabilized the bipartisan consensus that federal agencies must base their decisions on evidence, expertise, and analysis, and explores how future administrations can restore cost-benefit analysis.

Revesz has served as a member of the Council on Foreign Relations, a fellow of the American Academy of Arts and Sciences, and a member of the Environmental Economics Advisory Committee of the U.S. Environmental Protection Agency's Science Advisory Board, among other organizations. In 1994 and 2007, he received the American Bar Association award for best article or book on administrative law and regulatory practice.

=== Biden administration ===
On September 2, 2022, President Joe Biden nominated Revesz to be administrator of the Office of Information and Regulatory Affairs, a regulatory division within the Office of Management and Budget. He was confirmed by voice vote on December 21, 2022.

== Personal life ==
Revesz lives with his wife, Vicki Been, and their two children in New York City.

== Select bibliography ==
- Reviving Rationality: Saving Cost-Benefit Analysis for the Sake of the Environment and Our Health with Michael Livermore. (2020).
- Retaking Rationality: How Cost-Benefit Analysis Can Better Protect the Environment and Our Health with Michael Livermore. (2008).
- Environmental Law and Policy. (2008).
- Grandfathering and Environmental Regulation: The Law and Economics of New Source Review with Jonathan Nash. 101 Northwestern University Law Review 1677 (2007).
- Centralized Oversight of the Regulatory State, with Nicholas Bagley. 106 Columbia Law Review 1260 (2006).
- Anti-Regulation Under the Guise of Rational Regulation: The Bush Administration's Approaches to Valuing Human Lives in Environmental Cost-Benefit Analyses, with Laura Lowenstein. 34 Environmental Law Reporter 10,954 (2004).
- Foundations of Environmental Law and Policy. 2nd Ed.(2000).
- Federalism and Interstate Environmental Externalities, 144 U. Pa. L. Rev. 2341 (1996) cited by the Supreme Court in EPA v. EME Homer City Generation, 572 U. S. ____ (2014).

== See also ==
- List of law clerks for the tenth seat of the Supreme Court of the United States

Academic offices
| Preceded by John Sexton | Dean of New York University School of Law; 2002–2013 | Succeeded by Trevor Morrison |
Non-profit organization positions
| Preceded by Lance Liebman | Director of the American Law Institute; 2014–2023 | Succeeded by Eleanor Barrett; Acting |
