= Vicki Been =

American lawyer, public servant, and professor

Deputy Mayor of New York City for Housing and Economic Development
- In office April 4, 2019 – December 31, 2021
- Mayor: Bill de Blasio
- Preceded by: Alicia Glen
- Succeeded by: Maria Torres-Springer

Commissioner of the New York City Department of Housing Preservation and Development
- In office February 8, 2014 – January 17, 2017
- Mayor: Bill de Blasio
- Preceded by: Ruthanne Visnauskas
- Succeeded by: Maria Torres-Springer

Personal details
- Born: August 10, 1956 (age 70) Naturita, Colorado, U.S.
- Party: Democratic
- Spouse: Richard Revesz
- Children: 2
- Education: Colorado State University (BA); New York University (JD)

Vicki L. Been is an American lawyer, public servant, and professor who served as the deputy mayor of New York City for housing and economic development from April 2019 to December 2021. She previously served as commissioner of the New York City Department of Housing Preservation and Development. She is a law professor at the New York University School of Law and has served as director of the Furman Center for Real Estate and Urban Policy.

== Early life and education ==
Been was born and raised in Naturita, Colorado, a mining and ranching town. She graduated from Colorado State University, after paying her entrance fees partially with a scholarship she won in a cooking competition. After working for Consumers Union, she received a J.D. degree from the New York University School of Law, where she was a Root-Tilden scholar. Upon graduation, she clerked for judge Edward Weinfeld of the United States District Court for the Southern District of New York. Then she clerked for U.S. Supreme Court Associate Justice Harry Blackmun from 1984 to 1985. During her clerkship, she met her husband, Richard Revesz, who was clerking for Associate Justice Thurgood Marshall.

== Academic career and scholarship ==
After working for the Iran–Contra investigation and as an associate at Debevoise & Plimpton, Been began her academic career in 1988, joining the faculty of Rutgers–Newark School of Law, as an assistant professor. In 1990, she moved to NYU Law School. She achieved tenure in 1994 and currently serves as the Boxer Family professor of law. In 2004, she was named director of the Furman Center for Real Estate and Urban Policy.

Been's scholarly interests include property law, land use, and housing law. She began her academic career as one of the first law professors to address the area of environmental justice, focusing on equity considerations of the siting of undesirable land uses. She later turned her focus to the study of takings and eminent domain, writing articles on Supreme Court cases Palazzolo v. Rhode Island and Lucas v. South Carolina Coastal Council. As Director of the Furman Center, she has written extensively on New York City housing issues, publishing an annual State of New York City's Housing and Neighborhoods. She has also written on impact fees, foreclosures, community benefits agreements, parking requirements, inclusionary zoning, second liens, and assessing the impact of Superstorm Sandy on New York City neighborhoods. For her scholarship in the field of property law, Been was awarded the Brigham–Kanner Property Rights Prize at the eighteenth annual Brigham–Kanner Property Rights Conference.

In 2008, she was named an affiliated professor of public policy at NYU's Robert F. Wagner Graduate School of Public Service.

She is a member of the American Law Institute.

== Public service career ==
Been has served on the boards of the Municipal Art Society, Next City, the Center for New York City Neighborhoods, and the Pratt Center for Community Development.

=== Housing Preservation and Development commissioner ===
On February 8, 2014, New York mayor Bill de Blasio announced that Been would serve as the next commissioner of the New York City Department of Housing Preservation and Development. She succeeded RuthAnne Visnaukas in that role.

During Been's tenure, she undertook several initiatives to increase affordable housing in the city. In February 2016, Been defended a zoning proposal to allow taller buildings in exchange for more affordable housing units. In March 2016, Been gave a speech promoting her plan to foster development in East New York. A March 2016 report found growing demand for affordable housing, and Been explained the city's policy was to encourage developers to build more housing units. In May 2016, her office stated it received 2.5 million applications for 2,600 affordable apartments in the city program. In October 2016, she promoted the city's update of the Lambert Houses in the Bronx. In November 2016, her office initiated enforcement action seeking to make city landlords of affordable housing "play by the rules" or risk losing valuable tax exemptions.

On January 17, 2017, she announced she would step down as commissioner and return to teaching full time at New York University. Her departure came amidst resignations by other aides in the city administration.

=== Deputy Mayor ===
On April 4, 2019, New York mayor Bill de Blasio announced that Been would serve as the Deputy Mayor for Housing and Economic Development. Been succeeded Alicia Glen who she served under as Commissioner of Housing Preservation and Development.

=== New York State Government ===
In October 2022, Been was selected by the New York State Gaming Commission and Gaming Commission Chair Brian O'Dwyer to join the Gaming Facilities Location Board which will determine where downstate casinos are located.

In June 2024, Been was made Chair of the Gaming Facility Location Board.

== Personal life ==
Been lives with her husband, Richard Revesz, the former director of the American Law Institute and former dean of the NYU School of Law, and their two children, in New York City.

== See also ==
- List of law clerks for the second seat of the Supreme Court of the United States

== Selected publications and interviews ==
- Been, Vicki (1993). "What's Fairness Got to Do with It? Environmental Justice and the Siting of Locally Undesirable Land Uses". Cornell Law Review. 78 (6): 1001–1085.
- Been, Vicki (2003). "NAFTA's Investment Protections and the Division of Authority for Land Use and Environmental Controls". Pace Environmental Law Review. 20 (1): 19. doi:10.58948/0738-6206.1160. S2CID 153029041.
- Been, Vicki L. (2005). "Impact Fees and Housing Affordability" (PDF). Cityscape: A Journal of Policy Development and Research. 8 (1): 139–185.
- "The Brian Lehrer Show--Vicki Been Discusses Annual Housing Report". WNYC Radio. April 30, 2012.
