= New York City Taxi and Limousine Commission =

Government agency

Taxi and Limousine Commission
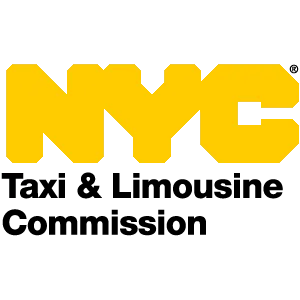

Commission overview
- Formed: March 2, 1971; 55 years ago
- Jurisdiction: New York City
- Headquarters: 33 Beaver Street, New York City, New York, U.S.
- Employees: 559 (FY 2024)
- Annual budget: $60.3 million (FY 2024)
- Commission executive: Midori Valdivia, Commissioner and Chair
- Key documents: New York City Charter; Local Law 12 of 1971
- Website: www.nyc.gov/tlc

The New York City Taxi and Limousine Commission (NYC TLC) is an agency of the New York City government that licenses and regulates the medallion taxis and for-hire vehicle industries, including app-based companies such as Uber and Lyft. The TLC's regulatory landscape includes medallion (yellow) taxicabs, green or Boro taxicabs, black cars (including both traditional and app-based services), pre-arranged car services (which require advance reservation and provide fixed-rate pricing), community-based livery cars, commuter vans, paratransit vehicles (ambulettes), and some luxury limousines.

New York State-issued TLC license plates are marked "T&LC".

== History ==
Mayor John Lindsay signed Local Law 12 which created the TLC in 1971, an agency which "purpose of which is the continuance, further development and improvement of taxi and for-hire service." Before the creation of the agency, the NYPD's Hack Bureau regulated the taxicab industry, starting in 1925. The bureau supervised "hacks", which referred to both taxicabs (hackney cabs) and cab drivers (also "hack drivers").

The TLC has acted as a technical consultant for major TV shows and films that involved taxicab use, such as Friends, Conspiracy Theory, and the Bone Collector.

The TLC has a Driver Safety Honor Roll, which recognizes the safest taxi and for-hire vehicle drivers in New York City. Drivers on the Honor Roll have had no crashes involving fatalities or injuries, no traffic violations, and no violations of TLC safety-related rules for five years or more.

Commissioner	Years
Michael J. Lazar	1971-1974
Moses L. Kove	1974-1977
Jay Turoff	1977-1986
Ross Sandler (Acting)	1986
Gorman Gilbert	1986-1988
Ross Sandler (Acting)	1988
Jack S. Lusk	1988-1991
Fidel Del Valle	1991-1995
Christopher R. Lynn	1995-1996
Diane McGrath-McKechnie	1996-2001
Matthew W. Daus	2001-2010
David Yassky	2010-2013
Meera Joshi	2014-2019
Bill Heinzen (Acting)	2019-2020
Aloysee Heredia Jarmoszuk	2020-2022
Ryan Wanttaja (Acting)	2022
David Do	2022-2026
Midori Valdivia	2026-

== Structure ==
The TLC Chair and Commissioner, presides over the agency's board of nine commissioners during regularly scheduled public Commission meetings. Eight of the commissioners are unsalaried and appointed by the Mayor, with the advice and consent of the City Council. Five of the commissioners—one seat for each borough—are recommended for appointment by a majority vote of the councilmembers within each borough. Commissioners serve a seven-year term. The agency's regulations are compiled in title 35 of the New York City Rules.

The TLC chair, who is salaried, also heads the agency, which has a staff of about 600 employees. The agency's divisions and bureaus include Uniformed Services, Licensing, Legal, Policy, Public Affairs, Safety & Emissions, among others. The Uniformed Services Bureau has more than 200 inspectors.

== Operations ==
As the regulator, the TLC establishes the larger public transportation policy that governs taxi and for-hire transportation services in New York City. The agency's responsibilities include protecting public safety and consumer rights, issuing and regulating licenses, setting and enforcing the fare rate in taxis, limiting taxi lease rates, and overseeing the sale of taxi medallions.

The TLC licenses about 170,000 professional drivers in New York City. It is common for TLC-licensed drivers to work for several companies, as well as in different industry segments. The agency also licenses more than 100,000 vehicles, as well as over 1,000 for-hire vehicle bases, according to its 2016 annual report.

== TLC Enforcement Division ==
New York City Taxi and Limousine Commission Enforcement Division
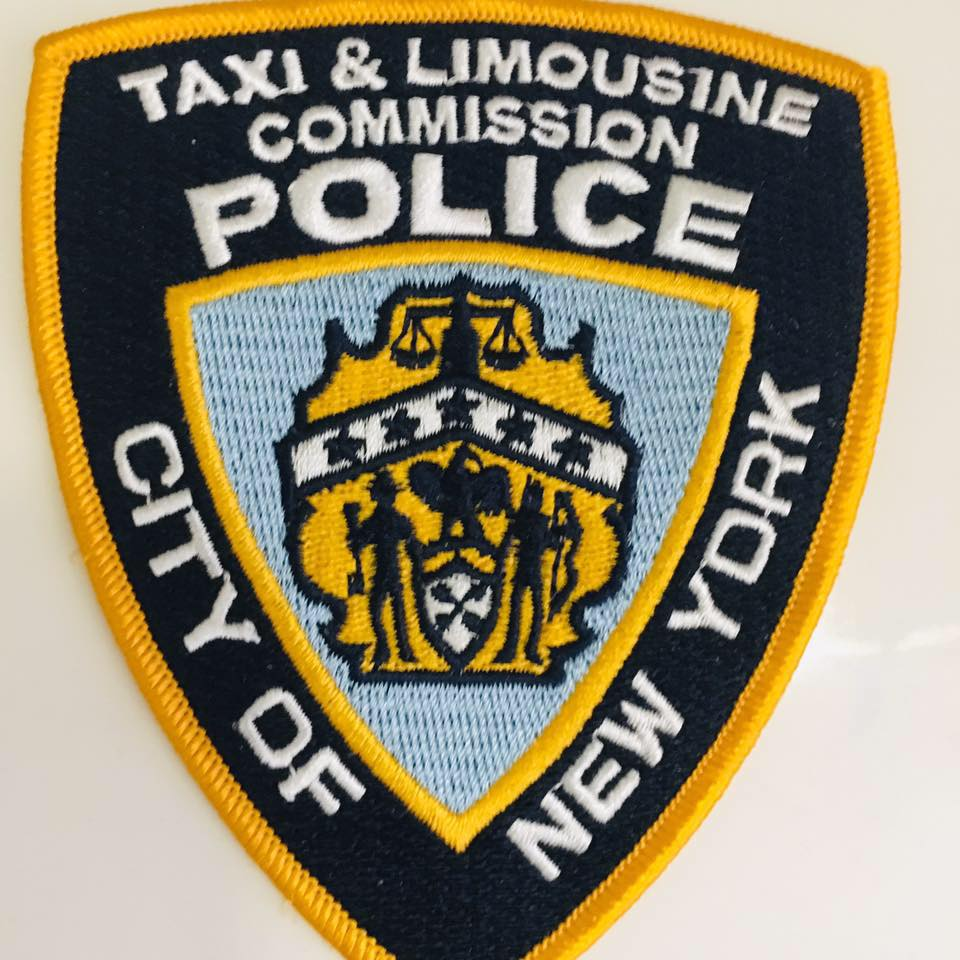
- Patch of the New York City TLC Police

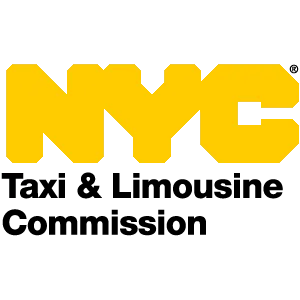
- Logo of the TLC

- Flag of the City of New York
- Abbreviation: TLC Police
- Motto: New York's Proudest

Jurisdictional structure
- Operations jurisdiction: New York, New York, United States
- Legal jurisdiction: New York
- General nature: Local civilian police

Operational structure
- NYC Special Patrolmans: Approx. 240

Website
- NYC TLC Website

The Enforcement Division, part of the Uniformed Services Bureau (USB) is staffed by uniformed officers who are NYC Special Patrolmen This includes the Vision Zero, which focuses on safety-related enforcement like moving violations, which include failing to yield to pedestrians, and restrictions on cell phone use while driving.

The New York City Police Department is the primary policing and investigation agency within New York City as per the NYC Charter, They respond to all incidents that involves at NYC Taxi & Limousine Commission employee.

The TLC is testing new vehicle safety technologies in licensed vehicles as part of a safety pilot, which began in 2015, according to the agency's website. Technologies include electronic data recorders, speed governors, and driver-alert systems. The pilot looks at how safety technologies affect driving behaviors, collision rates, the experience of drivers and passengers, and the expenses of drivers.

According to the TLC, the primary mission of the Enforcement Division is:

to maintain public safety by deterring illegal operation of unlicensed vehicles, and ensuring compliance of all TLC Rules and Regulations, Vehicle Traffic Laws, the Administrative Code and NYC Rules and Regulations within its regulated industries.

=== Uniform ===
TLC Special Patrolmen wear a typical NYC law enforcement-style uniform: Their shoulder patch reads "TAXI AND LIMOUSINE COMMISSION POLICE, CITY OF NEW YORK", with the standard NYC logo inside the centre of the patch. supervisor wear white shirts,

=== Powers and authority ===
TLC Officers are designated as NYC Special Patrolmen in connection with their special assignment, and such designation confers very limited NYS peace officer powers, pursuant to New York State Criminal Procedure Law § 2.10(27) and TLC policies. The exercise of this authority are very limited to the employee's geographical area of employment and only while such employee is working as listed in Chapter 13 subsection (C): Special Patrolmen

=== Equipment and vehicles ===
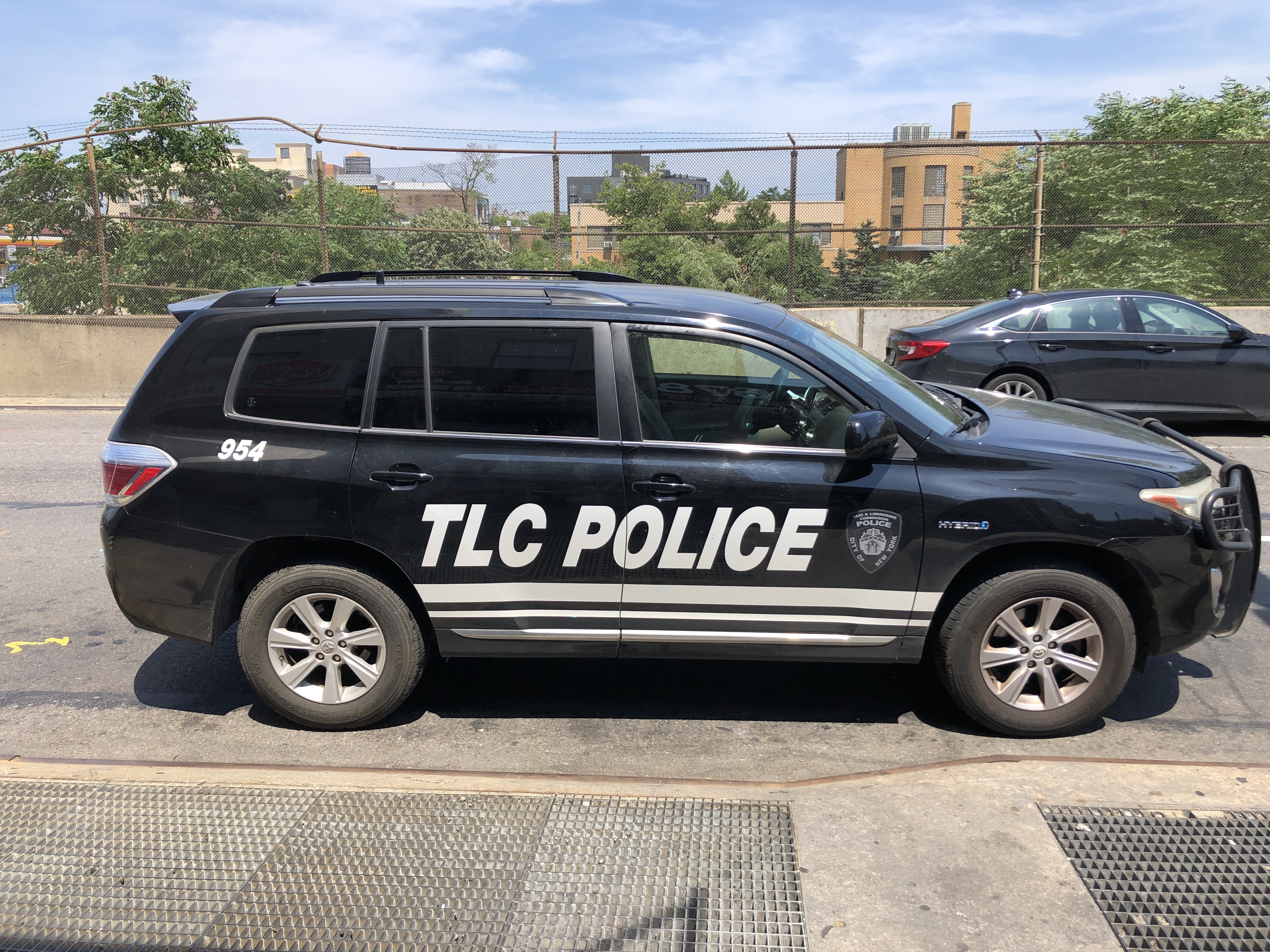
New look of TLC Police vehicle.

TLC Special Patrolmen are prohibited by New York State Law (Criminal Procedure Law) and employer restriction to use or carry a firearm, They do carry:

- ASP Baton
- Aerosol Subject Restraint Spray
- Handcuffs
- Radio linked with central dispatch and other officers

TLC Uniform Service Bureau use typical marked patrol vehicles and are marked as "TLC POLICE" or "ENFORCEMENT".

=== Training ===
TLC Special Patrolmen go through a 21-week training which includes:

- NYS DCJS Basic Peace Officer Course
- Defensive tactics
- fitness
- customer service training

=== Ranks ===
The TLC Special Patrolmen rank structure is as follows:

Title	Insignia	Uniform Shirt Colour
TLC Commissioner	n/a (non-uniformed)	n/a
TLC Chief of Patrol		White
TLC Chief		White
TLC Deputy Chief		White
TLC Captain		White
TLC Lieutenant	NYPD_Lieutenant	White
TLC Special Patrolman (Officer)		Dark Blue

== Future goals ==
The city's goal is to have the Medallion Taxicab fleet reach 50% wheelchair-accessibility by 2020. The number of wheelchair-accessible taxis in New York City has tripled from 238 in 2013 to 850 taxicabs on the road in 2016. Almost 300 new wheelchair-accessible medallion taxicabs went into service in the first six months of 2016, according to TLC data. The taxi fleet achieved 50% wheelchair-accessibility in June 2025.

Since September 2015, taxicab medallion owners may purchase the Taxi of Tomorrow (a Nissan NV200 Taxi), a TLC-approved wheelchair-accessible vehicle, or a hybrid vehicle. The first Taxi of Tomorrow began providing service in October 2013. Its features include a large cabin, passenger charging stations and reading lights, independent passenger climate control, yellow seatbelt straps, handles to assist stepping in and out, a clear panoramic roof, and sliding doors to prevent injuries from dooring. The NV200 taxicab is the first taxi vehicle to be equipped with Hearing Loop technology.

== Licensing and standards ==
The TLC licenses and sets standards for New York City’s diverse taxi and for-hire vehicle industries. This includes licensing drivers and vehicles in those industries. Drivers seeking to obtain a license from the TLC are fingerprinted, must pass a drug test, complete a driver education course approved by the TLC that includes a defensive driving course, and must undergo wheelchair-accessible vehicle training, among other requirements. The TLC also closely reviews an applicant’s driving history.

Vehicle owners seeking to obtain a license to use their vehicle in the for-hire vehicle industries are subject to inspections by the TLC and receive a TLC license plate from the New York State Department of Motor Vehicles. Bases that dispatch vehicles, which include app-based companies, are licensed by the TLC.

== Controversies and criticisms ==
TLC inspectors may seize vehicles suspected of operating as an illegal cab, and DNAinfo reported in 2014 that the city Office of Administrative Trials and Hearings' Taxi and Limousine Tribunal dismissed 1442 of the 7187 accusations over 1.5 years. The TLC said in a statement that "while the vast majority of cases—more than 80%—are prosecuted as written, the fact that there are a certain number of cases that are dismissed means that the system works for everyone." Owners can't retrieve their impounded cars unless they plead guilty and pay a fine, or until their hearing before a city administrative judge.

In 2005, the TLC refused to allow alternative-fuel vehicles to be used as cabs, despite the New York City Council's vote to approve them. Cab operator Gene Freidman, who had purchased several hybrid vehicles after the council's ruling, sued the TLC in New York's Supreme Court. The City Council, "angered" by the TLC's defiance of its decision, passed a bill in June 2005 compelling the TLC to approve at least one alternative-fuel vehicle to be used as a taxicab. The TLC relented and approved six hybrid models to be used as cabs.

In April 2015, the TLC posted a notice in the City Record proposing the "Licensing of For-Hire Vehicle Dispatch Applications", requiring mobile app operators to apply for approval of certain changes to any app used to arrange vehicle rides for hire, widely considered to be targeted at Uber, causing a controversy.

In August 2018, the TLC stopped issuing new vehicle licenses for one year, in an attempt to "study the effects of ride-hail services in the city."

A Motherboard report, using information obtained through a Freedom of Information Act request, confirmed rumors that at least five TLC-licensed cabs were in reality undercover New York City Police Department vehicles. TLC refused to comment, as did NYPD. Both agencies were subsequently criticized for lack of transparency and accused of using the undercover cabs in stop-and-frisk and racial profiling operations by a National Lawyers Guild Police Accountability Project member.

After the Second Circuit Court of Appeals, in a decision by Circuit Judge Gerard E. Lynch, held the TLC's post-suspension hearing practice unconstitutional, the City agreed to settle the case with nearly 20 thousand drivers for $140 million. In approving the class settlement, Judge Richard J. Sullivan, said the settlement was "the largest due-process settlement ever reached by the City of New York" and “one of the largest due-process settlements in the nation.” Judge Sullivan, who had dismissed the case twice, wrote, “By any measure, this nearly 20-year lawsuit stands apart,” citing “the historic nature of the settlement.” Following the settlement, the vast majority of drivers whose licenses had been summarily suspended are reinstated after hearings following practices revised based on the Nnebe decision.

== See also ==
- Taxis of New York City
- New York City Office of Administrative Trials and Hearings (OATH), for hearings conducted on summonses for TLC rules and regulations violations
