= Anne Williams-Isom =

American politician

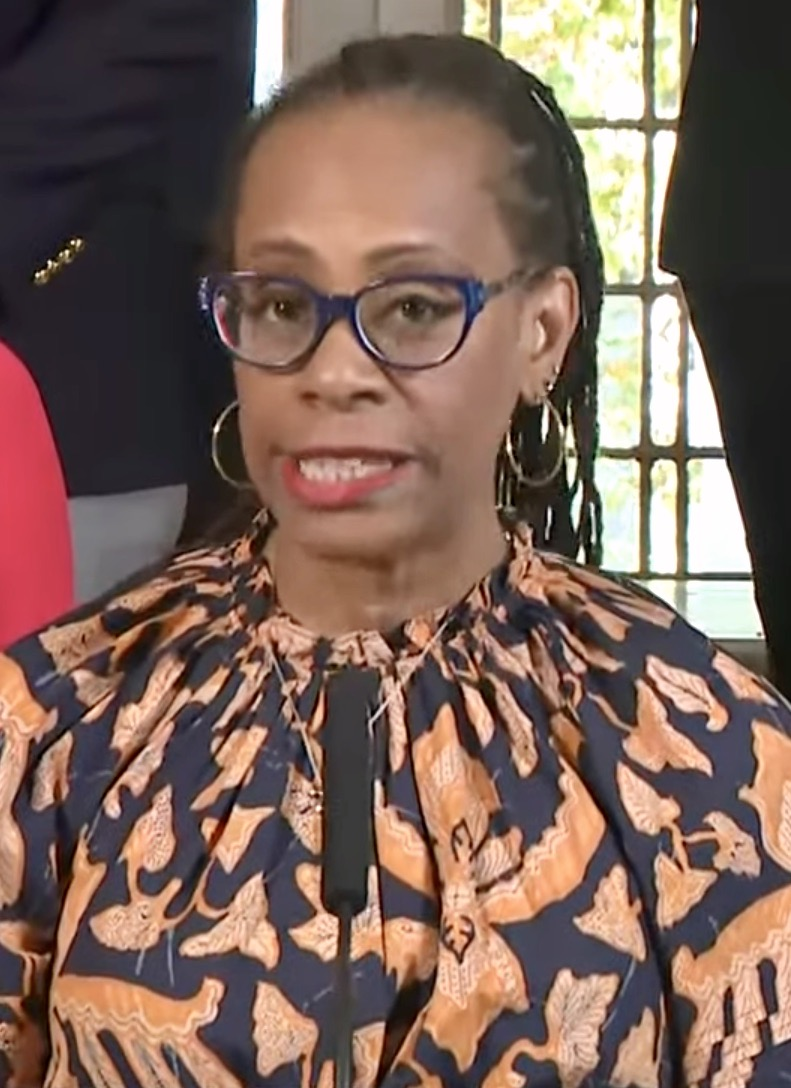
- Williams-Isom in 2023

Deputy Mayor of New York City for Health and Human Services
- In office January 1, 2022 – March 14, 2025
- Mayor: Eric Adams
- Preceded by: Melanie Hartzog
- Succeeded by: Suzanne Miles-Gustave

Acting First Deputy Mayor of New York City
- In office October 8, 2024 – October 8, 2024
- Mayor: Eric Adams
- Preceded by: Sheena Wright
- Succeeded by: Maria Torres-Springer

Personal details
- Born: Anne Williams; November 17, 1964 (age 61) Queens, New York City, U.S.
- Spouse: Phillip Isom
- Children: 3
- Education: Fordham University; Columbia Law School
- Occupation: Government official, academic, lawyer, nonprofit executive

Anne Williams-Isom (born November 17, 1964) is an American government official, academic, lawyer and former nonprofit executive who served as New York City deputy mayor for health and human services from January 2022 to March 2025. She also served as acting first deputy mayor of New York City from the departure of former first deputy mayor Sheena Wright in the morning on October 8, 2024 until the appointment of Maria Torres-Springer as first deputy mayor later that same day in accordance with Executive Order 45 that was issued and signed on September 26, 2024 by Mayor Eric Adams that automatically delegates the duties of first deputy mayor to the deputy mayor for health and human services if for any reason the position of first deputy mayor becomes vacant or the first deputy mayor is for any reason unable to perform the duties of first deputy mayor. She holds the James R. Dumpson chair of child welfare studies at Fordham Graduate School of Social Service. She was the chief operating officer and later the chief executive officer of the Harlem Children's Zone.

== Early life ==
Williams was born on November 17, 1964, in Queens, New York City, to Edna and Atthille Williams. Williams was a student at St. Catherine of Sienna School in St. Albans, Queens. Her mother emigrated to the United States from Trinidad and Tobago. She graduated from the Dominican Commercial High School.

Williams-Isom completed a B.S. in political science and psychology at Fordham University in 1986. That year, she started working in community affairs at the New York City Police Department in Brooklyn. Williams-Isom earned a Juris Doctor degree at Columbia Law School in 1991. She completed course work in ministry at the New York Theological Seminary.

== Career ==
In 1991, Williams-Isom joined Robinson, Silverman, Pearce, Aronsohn, and Berman. She joined Kalkines, Arky, Zall & Bernstein in 1994. In 1996, Williams-Isom joined the New York City Administration for Children's Services as the director of the Office of Community Planning and Development. She later served as special counsel to the commissioner. In 2006, under during the Mayoralty of Michael Bloomberg, she was promoted to deputy commissioner of community and government affairs at the New York City Administration for Children's Services.

Williams-Isom became the chief operating officer Harlem Children's Zone in 2009. On July 1, 2014, Williams-Isom succeeded Geoffrey Canada as its chief executive officer.

Williams-Isom is the James R. Dumpson chair of child welfare studies at Fordham Graduate School of Social Service.

In December 2021, Mayor-elect Eric Adams named Williams-Isom as the incoming deputy mayor for Health and Human Services.

== Personal life ==
Williams-Isom is married to Phillip Isom. They have three children. She is a member of the Abyssinian Baptist Church.
