= Lilliam Barrios-Paoli =

American politician

Deputy Mayor of New York City for Health and Human Services
- In office January 1, 2014 – September 2015
- Mayor: Bill de Blasio
- Succeeded by: Herminia Palacio

Commissioner of the New York City Department for the Aging
- In office 2008–2013
- Appointed by: Michael Bloomberg
- Preceded by: Edwin Mendéz-Santiago
- Succeeded by: Donna M. Corrado

New York City Human Resources Administration/Department of Social Services Commissioner
- In office February 1997 – December 1997
- Appointed by: Rudolph Giuliani
- Preceded by: Marva L. Hammons
- Succeeded by: Jason Turner

Personal details
- Born: Mexico
- Education: New School of Social Research

Lilliam Barrios-Paoli is a former New York City government employee.

== Life and education ==
Barrios-Paoli has a baccalaureate degree from Universidad Iberoamericana and a Masters and Ph.D. degree in Cultural and Urban Anthropology from the New School of Social Research. She has taught at the City University of New York, Hunter College, and the Bank Street College of Education in New York City, and Rutgers University and Montclair State College in New Jersey.

== Career ==
Under Mayor Rudolph Giuliani, Barrios-Paoli was the City's Commissioner of the Human Resources Administration. She was forced out of the post due to her criticism of moves made by the administration.

In 2008 Barrios-Paoli served as Mayor Michael Bloomberg's Commissioner for the Aging where she oversaw the city's programs for the elderly.

Mayor-elect Bill de Blasio appointed Barrios-Paoli his deputy mayor for health and human services on December 12, 2013, effective January 1, 2014. She resigned in September 2015 to become the volunteer chairwoman of the board of the city's Health and Hospitals Corporation—which runs the city’s public hospitals. This announcement came during an ongoing crisis of New York City's homelessness (an area of the Deputy Mayor's purview) and increased media scrutiny of the administration's policies.

Barrios-Paoli served as Senior Adviser to the President, Hunter College as of early 2023. In September 2024, Barrios-Paoli returned to the City government to help with the 2024 Asylum crisis.
