= Hotel and Gaming Trades Council =

Hotel workers' union

- Founded: 1938
- Headquarters: New York, New York
- Location: United States
- Members: nearly 40,000 (2025)
- President: Rich Maroko
- Affiliations: AFL-CIO
- Website: hotelworkers.org

The Hotel and Gaming Trades Council (HTC), often shortened to just the Hotel Trades Council is a labor union that represents nearly 40,000 hotel and casino employees in the New York metropolitan area. It is affiliated with the AFL-CIO.

== History ==
In 1912, the New York City waiters' strike broke out, marking one of the first attempts at unionization by hotel workers. Following multiple failed attempts, the HTC was founded in 1938, with their first city contract being struck the following year. Later in 1939, the union threatened strikes against hotels that had yet to negotiate contracts with them. In 1957, Martin Luther King Jr. gave an address to members of the HTC, receiving their annual Better Race Relations Award. While the HTC is mostly based in New York City, roughly 9,000 of their members live in New Jersey, which has seen an uptick in organizing from the group since 2015.
