= New York City Department for the Aging =

New York City government agency

Department for the Aging
Department overview
- Formed: 1975; 51 years ago
- Preceding department: Mayor's Office for the Aging
- Jurisdiction: New York City
- Headquarters: 2 Lafayette Street New York City, New York, 10007
- Employees: 302 (FY 2026)
- Annual budget: $617.9 million (FY 2026)
- Department executive: Lisa Scott-McKenzie, Commissioner for the Aging
- Key document: New York City Charter
- Website: www.nyc.gov/aging

The New York City Department for the Aging (NYC Aging) is the department of the government of New York City that provides support and information for older people (those over 60). Its regulations are compiled in title 69 of the New York City Rules.

== History ==
The passage of the federal Older Americans Act in 1965 created a nationwide aging network consisting of the federal Administration on Aging, along with state offices and local area agencies. In 1968, New York City established the Mayor's Office for the Aging, which was funded as a three-year demonstration project by the Older Americans Act. The office was responsible for planning, coordinating, and funding services for the elderly such as nutrition and hot meal programs in underserved and unserved communities, and initiating home-delivered meals.

In 1975, through an amendment of the New York City Charter, the Mayor's Office for Aging became the New York City Department for the Aging. Alice M. Brophy, who had headed the Mayor's Office for the Aging since its creation in 1968, became the first commissioner.

== Commissioners ==
The following is a list of the commissioners since the department was created:

Name	Years in Office	Mayoral Administration
Alice M. Brophy	1975–1978	Abraham D. Beame
Janet S. Sainer	1978–1989	Edward I. Koch
Prema Mathai-Davis	1990–1993	David N. Dinkins
Herbert W. Stupp	1994–2001	Rudolph W. Giuliani
Edwin Mendéz-Santiago	2002–2008	Michael R. Bloomberg
Lilliam Barrios-Paoli	2008–2013	Michael R. Bloomberg
Donna M. Corrado	2013–2019	Bill de Blasio
Lorraine Cortés-Vázquez	2019–2026	Bill de Blasio Eric Adams; Zohran Mamdani
Lisa Scott-McKenzie	2026–present	Zohran Mamdani
