= Randy Mastro =

American government official (born 1956)

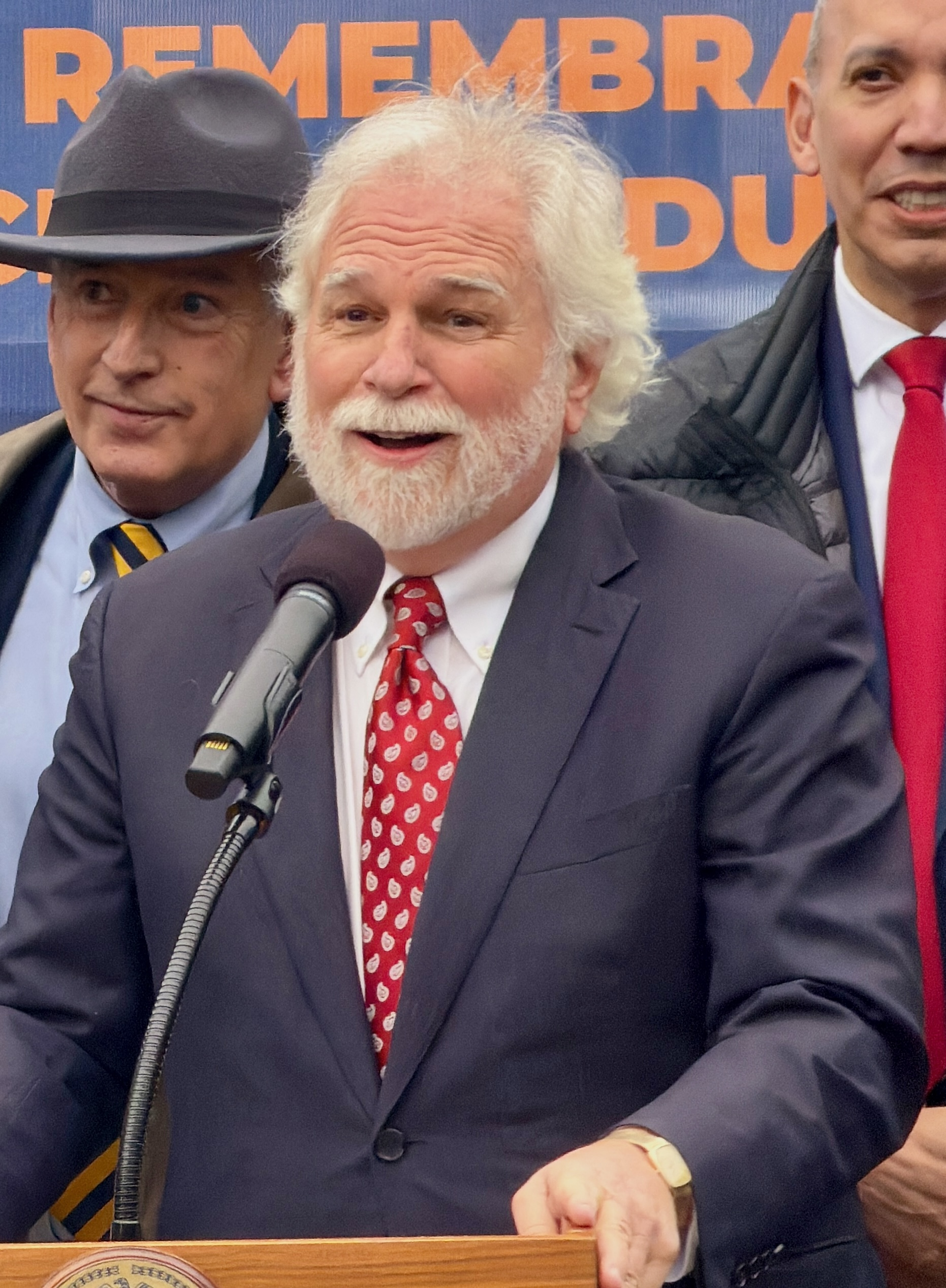
- Mastro in 2025

First Deputy Mayor of New York City
- In office March 20, 2025 – December 31, 2025
- Mayor: Eric Adams
- Preceded by: Maria Torres-Springer
- Succeeded by: Dean Fuleihan

Deputy Mayor of New York City for Operations
- In office September 3, 1996 – July 1, 1998
- Mayor: Rudy Giuliani
- Succeeded by: Joe Lhota

Chief of Staff to the Mayor of New York City
- In office January 1, 1994 – September 3, 1996
- Mayor: Rudy Giuliani
- Succeeded by: Bruce Teitelbaum

Personal details
- Born: August 21, 1956 (age 69)
- Spouse: Jonine Lisa Bernstein (m. 1994)
- Education: Yale University (BA); University of Pennsylvania (JD)

Randy M. Mastro (born August 21, 1956) is an American attorney and government official who served as first deputy mayor of New York City under Mayor Eric Adams from March to December 2025. He had previously served as chief of staff and deputy mayor for operations for New York City under Mayor Rudy Giuliani.

== Early life and education ==
A resident of Bernardsville, New Jersey, he graduated cum laude from Pingry School in 1973. Mastro was raised in Peapack-Gladstone, New Jersey. His father, Julius Mastro, was a professor of political science at Drew University.

He attended Pingry School, Yale University, then earned a Juris Doctor from the University of Pennsylvania.

== Career ==
From 1985 to 1989, Mastro served as an Assistant United States Attorney and Deputy Chief of the Civil Division in the U.S. Attorney's Office of the Southern District of New York. In 1989 he led the federal government's racketeering suit against the International Brotherhood of Teamsters, a labor union in the US and Canada.

Mastro served as Giuliani's chief of staff from 1994 to 1996, then became deputy mayor for operations, a new position, until 1998. He was a Democrat in Giuliani's Republican administration, which allowed him a peacekeeping role despite his aggressive style. He was regarded as the "administration's conscience" by another city official.

In 1995, Mastro was serving as the Mayor's Chief of Staff when he led a crackdown on mob activity in the city, specifically within the Fulton Fish Market. Mastro organized new regulations to improve how permitting, leasing and trucking would work at the facility so that the city could have more enforcement against suspected mafia activity. He also led public efforts to hinder organized crime at the San Gennaro Festival in Little Italy and reform the private carting industry in the city. He and his family were assigned police bodyguards during his campaigns against organized crime.

Mastro represented then-New York city council member Bill de Blasio in an unsuccessful 2008 suit to halt New York City's expansion of term limits for then-Mayor Michael Bloomberg. His firm later represented de Blasio as public advocate in a suit to stop the closure of Long Island College Hospital.

Before and after his tenure at the Mayor's office, Mastro was a partner at Gibson, Dunn, & Crutcher, one of the country's largest law firms, where he led the litigation department. While there, he defended large companies including Chevron and Amazon. In 2014, New Jersey Governor Chris Christie selected Mastro to lead an internal investigation after the Fort Lee lane closure scandal came to light. Mastro's firm billed the state $8 million for the inquiry, which cleared Christie of wrongdoing, though a federal judge later criticized it for lack of documentation.

In 2022 he then went to work as a partner at King & Spalding, another of the country's largest law firms. Mastro represented several major companies, including Amazon and Chevron. He is defending Madison Square Garden Entertainment in suits filed by former New York Knicks star Charles Oakley over his 2017 ejection from the arena, and by the attorney Larry Hutcher after the venue banned 60 lawyers involved in pending litigation against it.

On July 30, 2024, Mastro was nominated to be the corporation counsel for New York City by mayor Eric Adams, but he withdrew his nomination two months later after many city council members announced their opposition.

Throughout 2024, Mastro represented the state of New Jersey as it sued to halt New York's congestion pricing plan for Lower Manhattan.

On March 20, 2025, Mastro was appointed first deputy mayor of New York City by Mayor Eric Adams, making him the first person in city history to serve as top deputy and acting mayor in two different administrations (Adams and Giuliani). He oversaw central parts of the mayor's agenda including combating antisemitism, reducing fines for small landlords and halting the destruction of a garden on the Lower East Side.

Mastro announced on December 5, 2025, that he would resign from office as first deputy mayor of New York City effective December 31, 2025 when Mayor Eric Adams left office as Mayor of New York City at the end of his term.

In January 2026, Mastro joined Dechert LLP as partner and co-chair of the firm's securities and complex litigation practice.

Mastro has taught as an adjunct professor at the University of Pennsylvania Law School and Fordham University School of Law.

Mastro is leading a lawsuit against the Mamdani administration's pied-à-terre tax.

== Personal life ==
Mastro lives on Manhattan's Upper East Side. In 1994, he married Jonine Lisa Bernstein, an epidemiologist.

In 2015, Mastro served alongside Alec Baldwin as co-chair of the Hamptons International Film Festival. In 2020, several vandals spray-painted the exterior of his home in retaliation for his involvement in a suit to close a homeless shelter on West 79th Street.

From 2016 to 2025 Mastro chaired the Citizens Union, a non-partisan group promoting local government accountability in New York City. He has also served as vice chair of the Legal Aid Society and on the board of advisors of the University of Pennsylvania Law School and the board of the City University of New York.

He owns a renovated 1925 townhouse worth $17 million on the Upper East Side.
