= Emma Wolfe =

American government official and advisor

Deputy Mayor of New York City for Administration
- In office March 2020 – December 31, 2021
- Mayor: Bill de Blasio
- Preceded by: Patricia Harris
- Succeeded by: Camille Joseph Varlack

Chief of Staff to the Mayor of New York City
- In office January 1, 2018 – December 31, 2021
- Mayor: Bill de Blasio
- Preceded by: Kevin O'Brien (acting)
- Succeeded by: Frank Carone

Personal details
- Born: Lowell, Massachusetts, U.S.
- Party: Working Families
- Education: Barnard College (BA)

Emma Wolfe is an American government official and advisor who served as Deputy Mayor of New York City for Administration and Chief of Staff to New York City mayor Bill de Blasio.

== Biography ==
Wolfe graduated from Barnard College in 2001, majoring in urban studies and sociology. After graduating from Barnard, she worked for ACORN, America Coming Together and the healthcare union 1199SEIU United Healthcare Workers East. Wolfe worked on the failed 2001 New York City mayoral election campaign for Mark Green.

From 2005 to 2009, Wolfe served as organizing director and then election campaigns director for the Working Families Party of New York state.

She then joined Bill de Blasio's office and served as his chief of staff when he was New York City Public Advocate from 2010 to 2012 and was as political director for de Blasio's mayoral campaign in 2013.

In 2014, Wolfe became the director of intergovernmental affairs and then chief of staff in the mayor's office in 2018. In March 2020, she was appointed by de Blasio to serve as chief of staff and deputy mayor for administration, where she oversaw the daily operations of the mayor's executive office and coordinated the operations of a number of mayoral agencies.

She was called one of Bill de Blasio's most trusted aides and was called his "secret weapon" by The New York Times. As deputy mayor and chief of staff, Wolfe worked on priorities such as universal prekindergarten, COVID-19 response, and helped strike compromises between the mayor and Governor of New York Andrew Cuomo.

In January 2022, Wolfe joined Barnard College, her alma mater, as Senior Advisor to President Sian Beilock. She was a board member of the New York City Housing Authority board as appointed by De Blasio. Wolfe was not reappointed upon Eric Adams entering office.

== Personal life ==
Wolfe hails from Lowell, Massachusetts, and is of Greek origin. Her mother, Kate Maguire, is an actress and CEO and artistic director of the Berkshire Theater Group, which organizes the annual Berkshire Theatre Festival. Wolfe is gay.
