= Alicia Glen =

American civil servant

Co-Chair of the Gateway Commission
- Incumbent
- Assumed office June 2, 2022
- Nominated by: Kathy Hochul
- Preceded by: Steve Cohen

Deputy Mayor of New York City for Housing and Economic Development
- In office January 1, 2014 – April 4, 2019
- Mayor: Bill de Blasio
- Succeeded by: Vicki Been

Personal details
- Born: New York City, New York

Alicia Glen is a civil servant who served as Deputy Mayor for housing and economic development for the New York City from 2014 to 2019. She was appointed by Mayor Bill de Blasio, and stepped down in early 2019. Mayor Eric Adams expressed wanting Glen as a possible candidate for the 2025 New York City mayoral election in the Democratic primary.

== Government career ==
Glen served as Mayor Bill de Blasio's Deputy Mayor for Housing and Economic Development from 2014 to 2019.

In June 2022, Glen was appointed by Governor Kathy Hochul to the Gateway Commission. She serves as co-chair.

Glen is the Chair of the Trust for Governor's Island.

Eric Adams referenced Glen as a possible candidate for the 2025 New York City mayoral election in the Democratic primary to succeed him.

== Private sector ==
Prior to becoming Deputy Mayor, Glen worked for Goldman Sachs for twelve years as head of the Urban Investment Group. Glen is the founding manager and principal at MSquared, a real estate development company in NYC.

== Personal life ==
Glen is the daughter of Kristin Booth Glen who was a State Supreme Court judge, and was appointed by Governor Mario Cuomo to the 1st department appellate division.

== See also ==
- Dean Fuleihan
- Anthony Shorris
- Stanley Brezenoff
- Kathryn Garcia
