= Patricia Harris =

CEO of Bloomberg Philanthropies

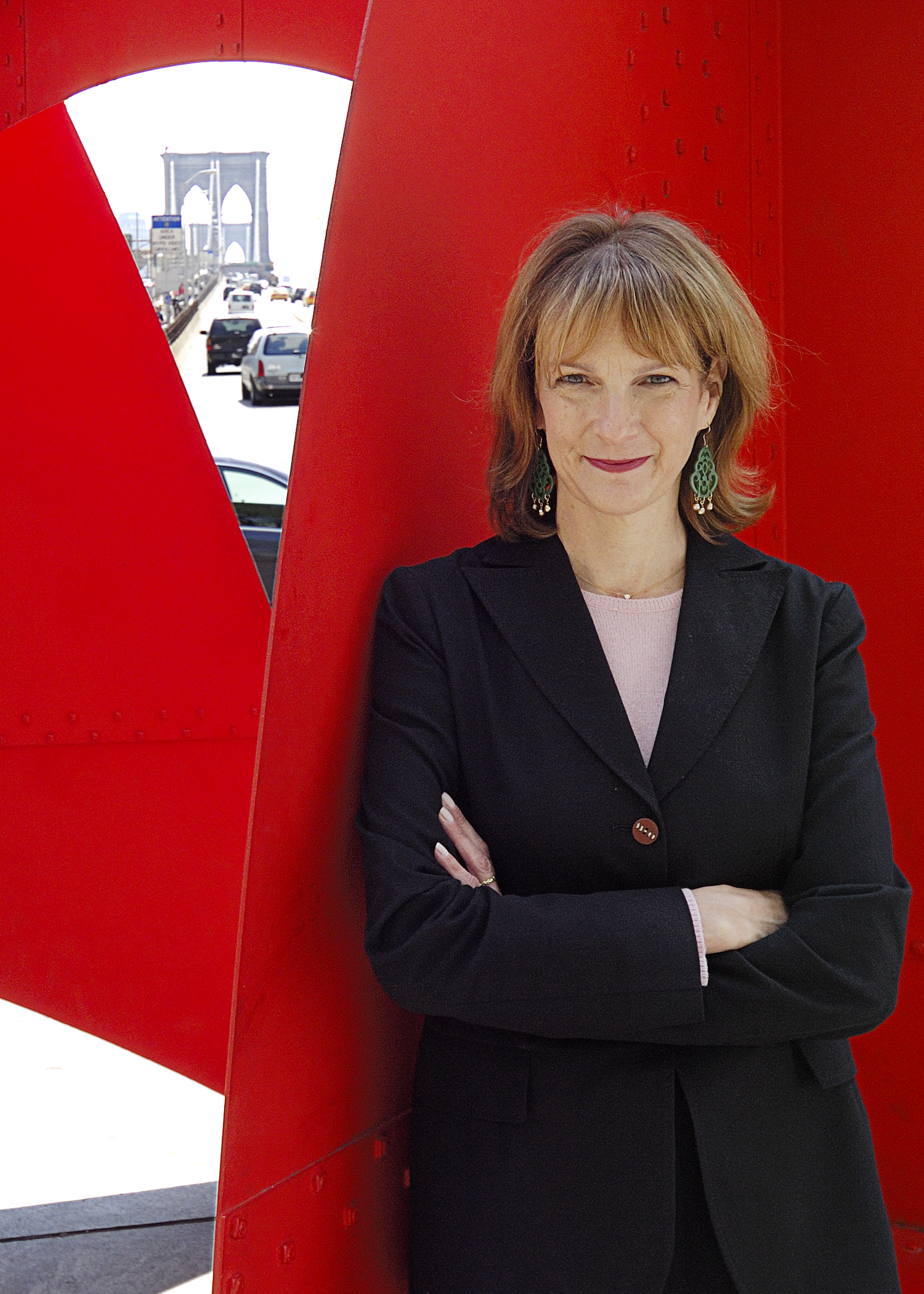

First Deputy Mayor of New York City
- In office January 1, 2006 – December 31, 2013
- Mayor: Michael Bloomberg
- Preceded by: Marc Shaw
- Succeeded by: Anthony Shorris

Deputy Mayor of New York City for Administration
- In office January 1, 2002 – December 31, 2005
- Mayor: Michael Bloomberg
- Preceded by: position created
- Succeeded by: Emma Wolfe

Personal details
- Born: September 1, 1956 (age 70) New York City, New York, U.S.
- Spouse: Mark Lebow (m. 1988)
- Education: Franklin & Marshall College (BA)

Patricia Harris (born September 1, 1956) is the chief executive officer of Michael Bloomberg's philanthropic foundation, Bloomberg Philanthropies. She served as deputy mayor of New York City for administration from 2002 to 2005 and then as first deputy mayor of New York City from 2006 to 2013. She advised the Mayor of New York City, then Bloomberg, on administrative, operational, and policy matters. In 2022, she was included on Forbes Magazine's 50 over 50 list and in 2016, she was named one of the magazine's most powerful women in the world.

== Early life and education ==
Born in 1956 and raised in New York City, Harris became interested in public service in high school at Ethical Culture Fieldston School in Riverdale, where she volunteered in then Congressman Ed Koch’s office.

In 1977, Harris graduated from Franklin & Marshall College with a Bachelor of Arts degree in Government. Franklin and Marshall's Harris Center for Business, Government, and Public Policy was donated in her name in 2009, and she served on the college's Board of Trustees from 2006 through 2025.

== Career ==
In 1977, Harris began her public service career as an assistant to Congressman Koch. Upon Koch's election as Mayor, she became an Assistant to the deputy mayor in 1979, and subsequently was appointed Assistant to the mayor for Federal Affairs. From 1983 to 1990, she served as executive director of the City's Art Commission.

Following her work with the Koch Administration, Harris served as vice president for Public Relations at Serino Coyne Advertising before joining Bloomberg LP in 1994, where she managed Bloomberg LP's Philanthropy, Public Relations, and Governmental Affairs divisions. Harris is generally credited with introducing founder Michael Bloomberg to the worlds of art and philanthropy.

Harris joined Michael Bloomberg's administration when he was elected mayor in 2001, serving first as deputy mayor for administration from 2002 to 2005 and then as first deputy mayor from 2006 to 2013. Harris was the first woman in New York City's history to serve as first deputy mayor. Harris is known as a key trusted adviser to Bloomberg, and she weighs in on every major policy or personnel decision.

According to Kevin Sheekey, whom Harris hired at Bloomberg LP in 1997 and who served as campaign manager when Bloomberg ran for president in 2020, "...almost anything that Mike has done in the political or philanthropic sector, you can trace its roots back somewhere to a Patti Harris origin."

Harris has been included on Crain's Business New York list of the most powerful women in New York City every year since the list began in 2011 and, according to a New York Times profile, she was the most powerful person in the Bloomberg administration.

Harris currently serves as the chief executive officer of Bloomberg Philanthropies, and she is the only person to serve in the role. The organization was set up by Michael Bloomberg who has pledged to give away all his wealth. From her position leading the foundation, Harris oversees Bloomberg's philanthropic giving, which he values as a key component of his legacy. Michael Bloomberg has been identified as one of the top five largest donors in America since 2015 and over the course of his lifetime, as of February 2023, has donated $14.4 billion.

In a 2018 profile, speaking of Harris's role at Bloomberg Philanthropies, Bloomberg said "Patti is the foundation." As of 2016, she is listed as the 87th most powerful woman in the world by Forbes and she appeared in the 2019 Politico Playbook Power List

Harris is a trustee of the 9/11 Memorial Museum in New York City, a board member of both the Perelman Performing Arts Center and the Public Art Fund, and a Trustee Emeriti for her alma mater Franklin and Marshall College.

== Professional recognition and awards ==
- On November 16, 2009, the NY Daily News described Harris as the "most powerful woman in New York that you've never heard of," based on her long tenure alongside Mike Bloomberg working to guide his philanthropic and government initiatives.
- Harris has been listed among Crain's "Most Powerful Women in New York" in each of the past four biannual lists. She has been cited for her work leading Bloomberg Philanthropies and the Mayor's Fund to Advance NYC, as well as her previous work as Deputy Mayor of New York. Most recently, she was listed at No. 32 in 2015.
- Harris was listed at No. 87 on Forbes's 2016 list of "The World’s Most Powerful Women." Forbes cited her stewardship of Bloomberg Philanthropies' global initiatives and distribution of $510 million in charitable giving in 2015, as well as her previous roles in New York City government and business. Harris was also listed in the 2015 edition of the Forbes list.
- On March 10, 2016, Inside Philanthropy included Harris among its list of the “50 Most Powerful Women in US Philanthropy.” The list recognized Harris's work to expand Bloomberg Philanthropies' annual giving, mission, and global reach since its founding in 2010.
- On October 3, 2016, City & State NY listed Harris as #32 in its list of 50 people with the greatest impact on the economy, development, and culture of Manhattan, NY. The article cited her support for improving education, the environment, and the arts in New York City and around the world.
- In 2017, Forbes listed Harris as one of the most powerful woman in philanthropy.
- In 2019, Harris was honored at the Central Park Conservancy's Annual Frederick Law Olmsted Awards Luncheon.
- In March 2025, Harris was awarded the French National Order of the Legion of Honour.

== Personal life ==
Harris is married to attorney Mark Lebow, a member of the Metropolitan Transportation Authority’s board.
