= Meera Joshi =

American attorney and transportation official (born 1969)

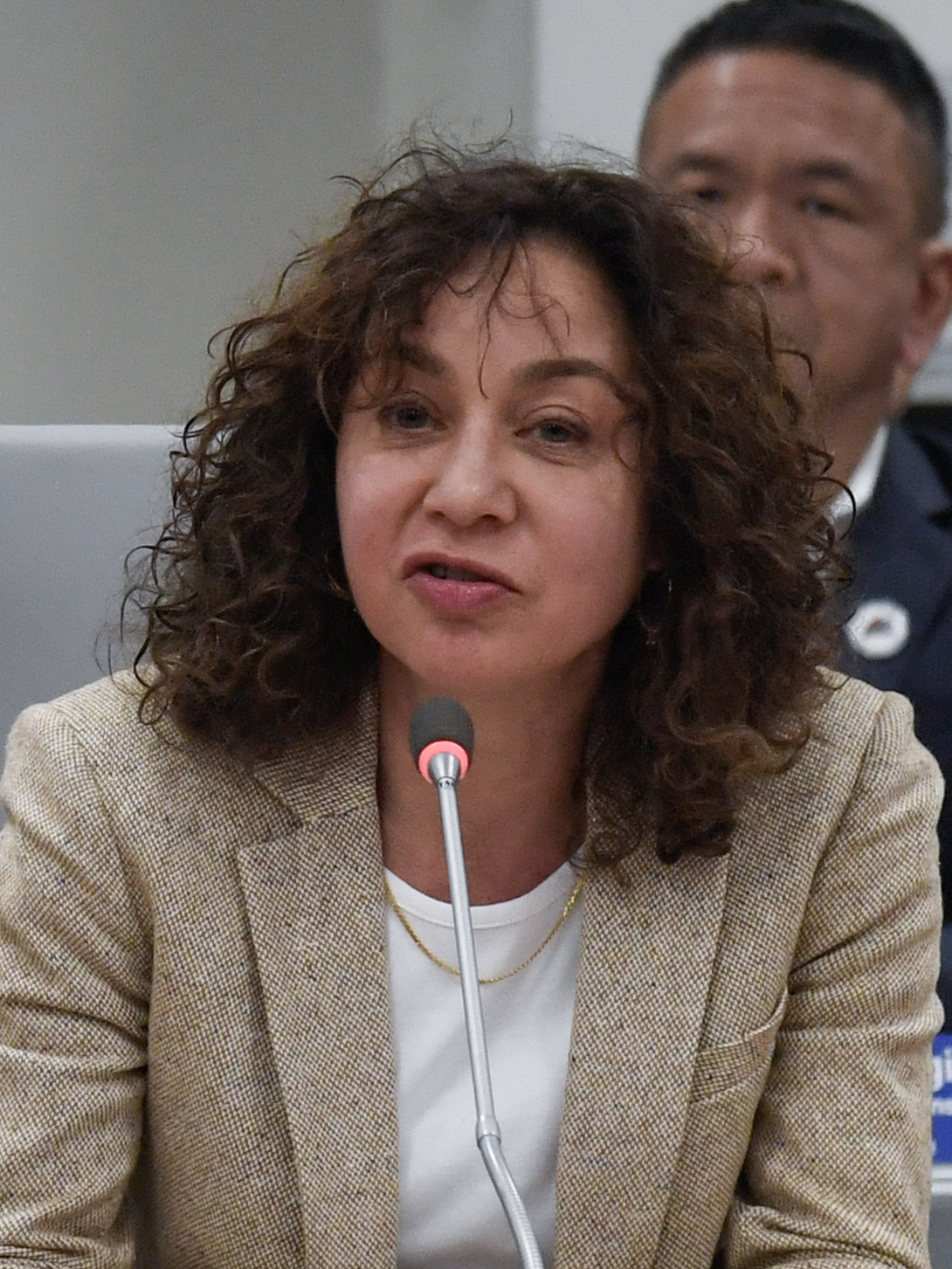

Deputy Mayor of New York City for Operations
- In office January 1, 2022 – March 14, 2025
- Mayor: Eric Adams
- Preceded by: Laura Anglin
- Succeeded by: Jeffrey Roth

Administrator of the Federal Motor Carrier Safety Administration
- Acting
- In office January 20, 2021 – January 1, 2022
- President: Joe Biden
- Preceded by: Wiley Deck (acting)
- Succeeded by: Jack Van Steenburg (acting)

New York City Taxi and Limousine Commissioner
- In office April 10, 2014 – March 2019
- Mayor: Bill de Blasio

Personal details
- Born: Meera J. Joshi; February 26, 1969 (age 56); Philadelphia, Pennsylvania, U.S.
- Relatives: Aravind Joshi (father)
- Education: University of Pennsylvania (BA, JD)

Meera Joshi is an American attorney and government official who served as New York City deputy mayor for operations from January 2022 to March 2025. She previously served as the deputy and acting administrator of the Federal Motor Carrier Safety Administration and New York City Taxi and Limousine Commissioner.

== Early life and education ==
Joshi was born and raised in Philadelphia to Marathi father Aravind Joshi, a professor of computer science and mother Susan Heyner, a professor of obstetrics and gynecology. She earned a Bachelor of Arts degree cum laude in sociology from the University of Pennsylvania in 1992 and a Juris Doctor from the University of Pennsylvania Law School in 1995.

== Career ==
From 1996 to 2000, Joshi was an associate attorney at Latham & Watkins. From 2000 to 2002, she was an associate at Morvillo Abramowitz Grand Iason & Anello PC. From 2002 to 2008, Joshi served as inspector general of the New York City Department of Correction. She was also the deputy director of the Civilian Complaint Review Board. In September 2011, Joshi joined the New York City Taxi and Limousine Commission, serving as deputy commissioner of legal affairs. She was later nominated as CEO and commission chair by Bill de Blasio on March 8, 2014, and confirmed on April 10, 2014. In 2019, Joshi was a visiting scholar at the Rudin Center for Transportation Policy & Management. Joshi left the Taxi and Limousine Commission in March 2019, and from 2020 to 2021, she was General Manager for the New York Office at Sam Schwartz Engineering.

In January 2021, Joshi joined the Federal Motor Carrier Safety Administration as deputy and acting administrator. On April 14, 2021, she was nominated to serve as administrator of the organization. On April 15, 2021, her nomination was sent to the Senate. Joshi withdrew her nomination after being appointed as a deputy mayor of New York City for operations in December 2021.
