= New York City Department of Small Business Services =

New York City government agency

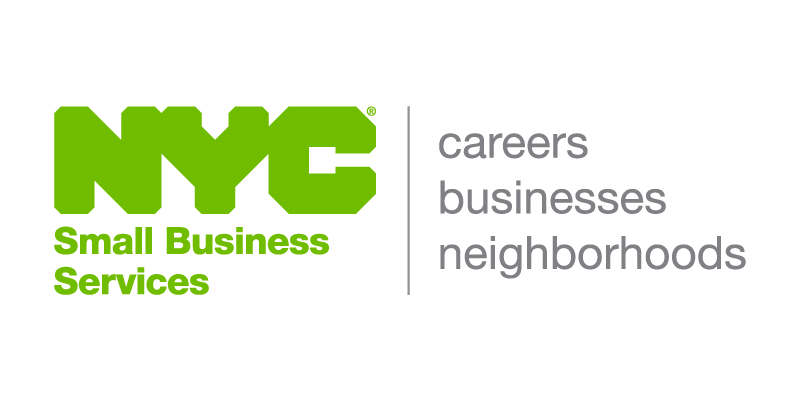

Department overview
- Jurisdiction: New York City
- Headquarters: 1 Liberty Plaza, 11th Floor New York, NY 10006
- Employees: 370 (FY 2026)
- Annual budget: $300.5 million (FY 2026)
- Department executives: Dynishal Gross, Commissioner; Michael Forte, Executive Deputy Commissioner
- Website: Official website

The New York City Department of Small Business Services (NYC SBS) is a municipal department of New York City supporting small businesses throughout the five boroughs. NYC SBS provides a wide range of programs, services, and resources aimed at helping small businesses. Its regulations are compiled in title 66 of the New York City Rules. SBS also issues waterfront construction permits.

SBS' programming falls under three main categories: careers, businesses, and neighborhoods.

== See also ==
- Economy of New York City
- Small Business Administration
- New York City
