= Investigations into the Eric Adams administration =

Investigations of New York City's mayor

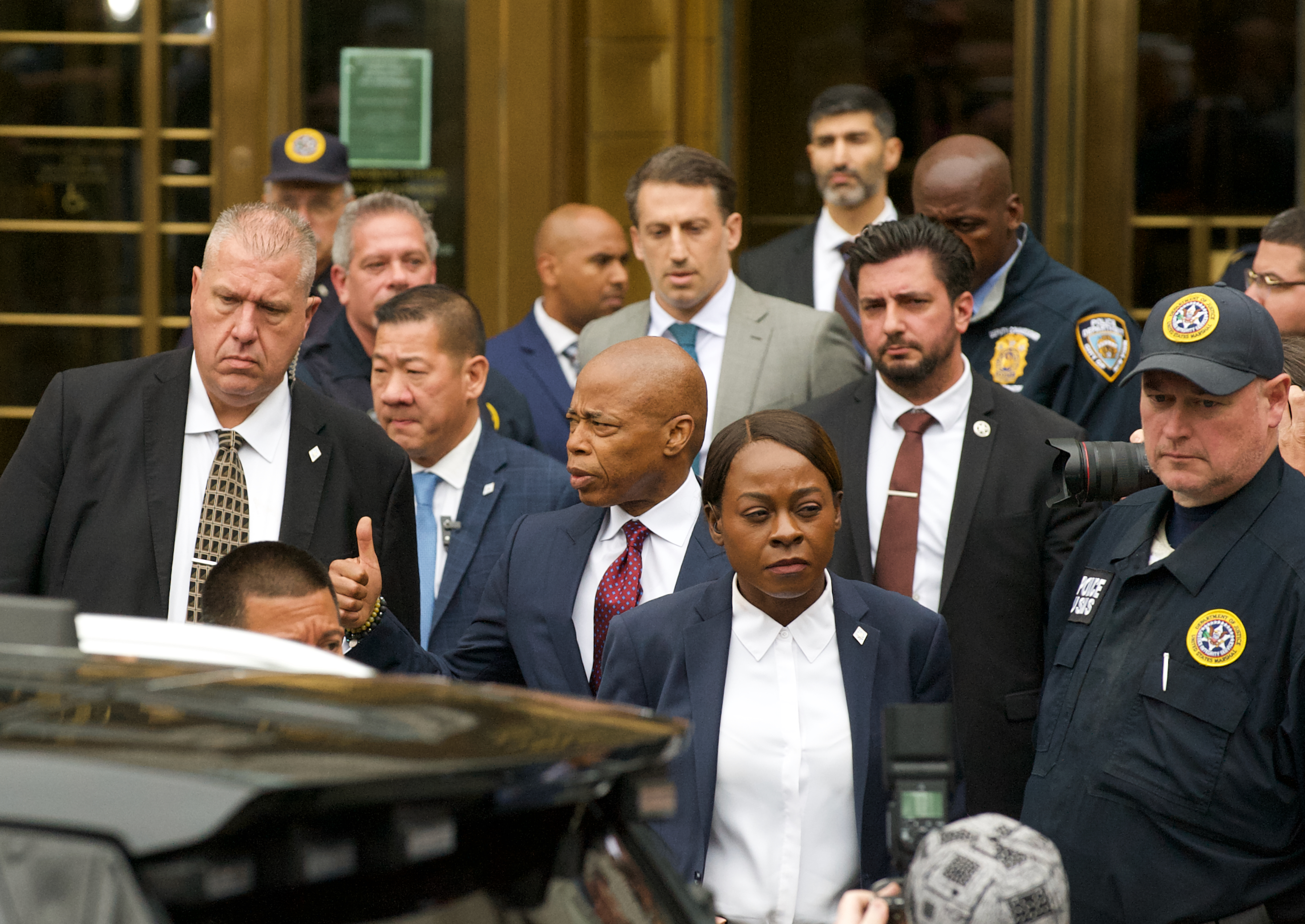
Eric Adams under arraignment in September 2024

There were several investigations into the Eric Adams administration during his term as Mayor of New York City, which began in 2022 and ended in 2025.

Chief among these investigations was the federal prosecution of Eric Adams overseen by the United States Attorney for the Southern District of New York that resulted in the criminal indictment of Adams in September 2024. This indictment charged Adams with one count of conspiracy to defraud the United States; one count of wire fraud; two counts of soliciting campaign contributions from foreign nationals; and one count of soliciting and accepting a bribe. On October 8, Adams's former Chief Liaison to the Muslim Community Mohamed Bahi, who had resigned the day prior, was arrested and charged with witness tampering and destruction of evidence in connection with Adams's indictment and the investigation of illegal contributions made to Adams's mayoral campaign.

Law enforcement interest in a wide swath of Adams's City Hall led to a number of unscheduled departures from the administration before Adams's indictment. The New York City Department of Investigation and New York County District Attorney arrested Buildings Commissioner Eric Ulrich in 2023 for an alleged bribery scheme, forcing him to leave the administration. A set of raids by IRS Criminal Investigation in 2024 led to the resignation of Police Commissioner Edward Caban. Similar warrant seizures of phones by the Federal Bureau of Investigation preceded the resignation of Schools Chancellor David C. Banks and his brother, Deputy Mayor Philip Banks III.

As the charges mounted, dozens of New York elected officials called for Adams to resign. Under the New York City Charter, the New York State Governor holds the power to suspend the Mayor for 30 days and ultimately remove him. Governor Kathy Hochul declined to exercise this right or call for Adams's resignation, saying that, "It's now up to Mayor Adams to show the City that he is able to lead", while under indictment. The charter also contains language to remove a mayor via a never-before-used Inability Committee, consisting of the city's corporation counsel, comptroller, council speaker, senior borough president, and one deputy mayor. It would take four votes to start the process of removing the mayor – temporarily or permanently – which he could dispute, and would still need to pass the full council.

Adams called the charges "entirely false, based on lies", and vowed to fight them. He and his defenders maintained that the charges were retaliation for his opposing the Biden-Harris administration's handling of the migrant crisis.

On February 10, 2025, the Department of Justice (DOJ) instructed federal prosecutors to drop charges against Adams. On February 13, 2025, the interim United States Attorney for the Southern District of New York, Danielle Renee Sassoon, resigned after refusing to drop the charges. Kevin Driscoll, the acting head of the DOJ's Criminal Division, and John Keller, the acting head of the DOJ's Public Integrity Section, also resigned in response to the instructions to drop the charges, as did three other prosecutors in the Public Integrity Section. Hagan Scotten, the assistant United States Attorney for the Southern District of New York who had been the lead prosecutor in the case against Adams resigned as well. On February 17, 2025, comptroller Brad Lander released a public letter to Mayor Adams threatening to convene a meeting of the Inability Committee if Adams did not "develop and present a detailed contingency plan outlining how you intend to manage the City of New York".

In April 2025, the judge presiding over the federal indictment, Dale Ho, dismissed the case against Adams with prejudice, without opining on the merits of the case, as Ho cited inability to force the Justice Department to prosecute.

Though charges against Adams were dropped in Southern District of New York, investigations and criminal prosecutions continued into a number of Adams administration officials and associates. Those currently being prosecuted by the Manhattan District Attorney for alleged corrupt schemes during the Adams administration include Department of Buildings Commissioner Eric Ulrich, chief advisor Ingrid Lewis-Martin, Department of Citywide Administrative Services official Jesse Hamilton, and Adams fundraisers Gina and Anthony "Tony" Argento (of Broadway Stages), businessman Tian Ji Li, and housing developer Yechiel Landau. The United States Attorney for the Eastern District of New York is prosecuting Adams's longtime advisor Frank Carone, his brother Anthony Carone, and hoteliers Yan Po Zhu and Crystal Chen in schemes to defraud federal aid programs assisting the Adams administration to house homeless migrants.

== Investigations ==
=== FBI investigation into Adams travel and campaign fundraising ===
==== Background ====
Dating to the Brooklyn borough presidency, Eric Adams has faced press scrutiny regarding his foreign travel. Adams has boasted in particular of his travel with Turkey, and of having met with Turkish president Recep Tayyip Erdoğan. In August 2015, the consulate-general of Turkey paid for Adams's trip to the country. As mayor, Adams boasts that no other mayor in New York City history had visited the country as often as he had.

In May 2021, employees of the Brooklyn construction firm KSK Construction donated a total of US$14,000 to Adams's mayoral campaign, allowing the campaign to qualify for US$18,000 in public matching funds. According to Politico, of the firm's 11 employees, 10 had not made a prior political donation; co-owner Erden Arkan had last donated to former Brooklyn borough president Marty Markowitz's campaign in 2009. KSK Construction is heavily financed by the Turkish bank VakıfBank, which is controlled by the Turkish state.

After securing the 2021 Democratic mayoral primary nomination in July, Adams urged then-fire-commissioner Daniel A. Nigro to allow the government of Turkey to occupy the Turkish House; the New York City Fire Department declined to sign off on the building, citing fire safety issues.

==== Investigation ====
Mayor Eric Adams speaks at a flag raising ceremony in celebration of the 100th Anniversary of the Republic of Turkey on October 27, 2023.

In spring 2023, the Federal Bureau of Investigation (FBI) and the United States Attorney for the Southern District of New York began a corruption investigation into alleged straw donors from the government of Turkey through construction company KSK Construction to Adams's 2021 campaign.

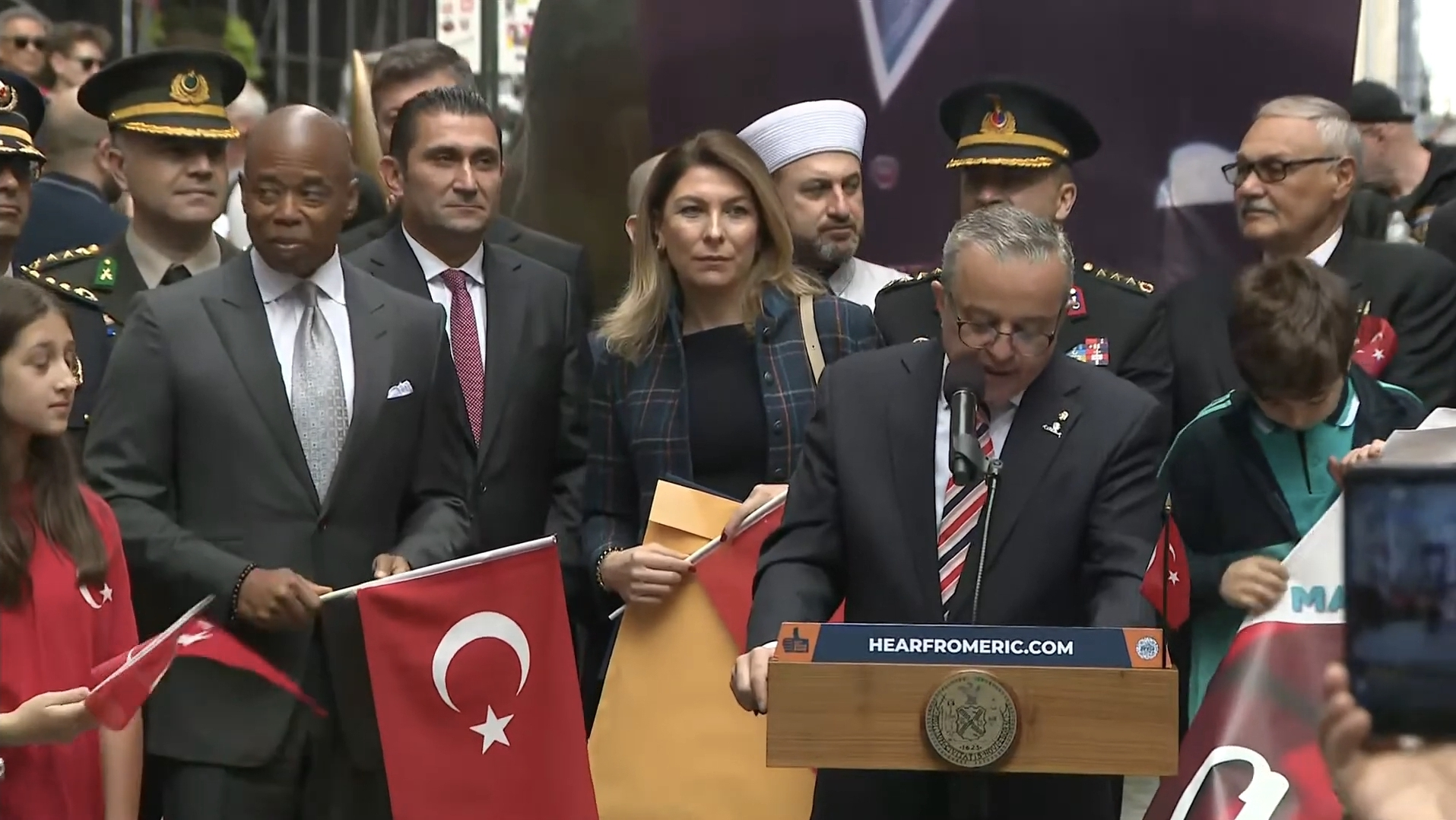
Eric Adams and Rana Abbasova in October 2023

On November 2, 2023, investigators raided the Brooklyn home of Brianna Suggs, Adams's chief fundraiser. The search warrant, obtained by The New York Times, states agents seized three iPhones, two laptops, contribution card binders, and other documents. The Federal Bureau of Investigation searched a dozen locations that day, including the residence of former Turkish Airlines executive Cenk Öcal and Director of Protocol in the Mayor's Office for International Affairs Rana Abbasova. On November 3, investigators questioned Nigro over the Turkish House. Days after the raid at Suggs's home, the FBI seized at least two of Adams's cellphones and an iPad. Adams's campaign cooperated with the FBI's request.

On April 5, 2024, the Times reported that the FBI was investigating flight upgrades Adams purportedly received on Turkish Airlines flights. In July, investigators served grand jury subpoenas.

In addition to the resignation and seizing of the phone of police commissioner Caban, Adams's counsel and chief legal adviser Lisa Zornberg resigned, as did deputy commissioner of public private partnerships and economic development Kristen Kaufman. Director of Asylum Seeker Operations Molly Schaeffer was also visited by law enforcement, who served a federal subpoena on her.

==== Reactions ====
Adams canceled several meetings at the White House to discuss the New York City migrant housing crisis following the raid. At a Day of the Dead celebration at Gracie Mansion that night, Adams stated that his campaign was up to the "highest ethical standards". Adams denied the accusations at New York City Hall press conference the following week, disclosing that he had retained the law firm Wilmer Cutler Pickering Hale and Dorr.

Following a report from The New York Times that Adams was being investigated over the construction of the Turkish House, Adams further denied wrongdoing and assured that he would continue to cooperate with investigators. Adams and the City Hall's chief counsel requested the FBI cease leaks of its investigation.

Brooklyn Democratic Party chairwoman Rodneyse Bichotte Hermelyn questioned whether the inquiry was related to Adams's race. State senator Leroy Comrie called the investigation a witch hunt. Representative Brandon Williams accused the investigation of being a "weaponization of the justice system" against Adams's critical comments towards president Joe Biden. New York City Council minority leader Joe Borelli defended Adams on Twitter. The New York Post's editorial board questioned whether the investigation could be political retribution. Politico compared the rhetoric among Adams's supporters with Donald Trump's supporters.

The Campaign Finance Board rejected, later in the year, Adams's matching funds request for his reelection campaign. The campaign requested $4 million. Board chair Federick Schaffer explained that "the Board has determined there is reason to believe the Adams campaign has engaged in conduct detrimental to the matching funds program, in violation of law, including the Campaign Finance Act and Board Rules." The campaign can appeal the decision, or opt out of receiving matching funds altogether to raise the individual donor cap from $2,100 to $3,700.

=== Ulrich, Department of Buildings investigation ===
On November 1, 2022, investigators working for the Manhattan District Attorney seized the phone of New York City Department of Buildings Commissioner Eric Ulrich pursuant to a search warrant. Ulrich resigned from the administration shortly thereafter.

On August 3, 2023, the New York Daily News reported that Ulrich had been indicted for corruption charges. On September 13, 2023, Ulrich was arrested on 16 felony corruption charges; he pleaded not guilty. Also charged were the brothers Anthony and Joseph Livreri, owners of a pizzeria, as well as Michael Mazzio, a tow-truck business owner. The indictment accuses the business owners of buying favors from Ulrich both before and after his appointment to the Adams administration. Ulrich allegedly used bribe money to make wagers in legal and illegal gaming establishments.

=== NYPD, Caban brothers scandal ===
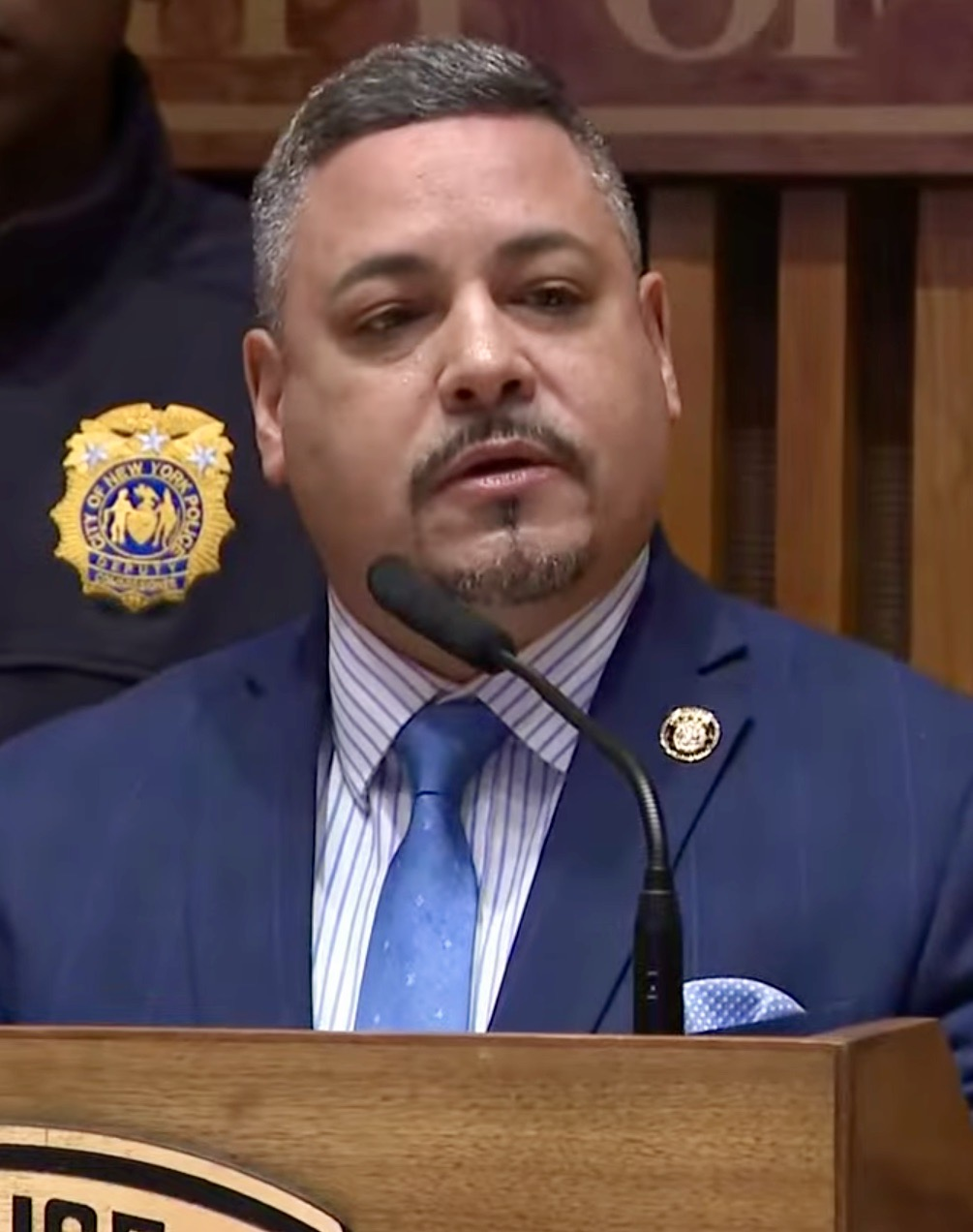
Edward Caban resigned his role as NYPD Commissioner after having his phone seized by federal agents.

In early September 2024, federal agents, at the direction of the office of the U.S. Attorney for the Southern District of New York, seized the phone of New York City Police Commissioner Edward Caban. The probe focuses on nightclub protection services owned by Caban's twin brother, James Caban, who was fired from the NYPD in 2001 and also had his phone seized. Edward Caban resigned on September 12, at the request of the Adams administration.

According to Caban's lawyers, he was told he was not a subject of investigation.

=== Banks brothers bribery and corruption investigation ===
The office of the U.S. Attorney for the Southern District of New York is investigating a possible bribery scheme focusing on the consulting firm Pearl Alliance. The firm was founded by Terence Banks, the brother of Philip Banks III, deputy mayor of New York City for public safety, and David C. Banks, the New York City schools chancellor. Philip and David each oversaw public agencies that tendered contracts with clients of the Pearl Alliance. All three brothers had their phones seized.

In September 2024, search warrants were served to employees of SaferWatch – also a client company of The Pearl Alliance – in relation to the possible corruption investigation. The New York City Police Department paid SaferWatch more than $67,000 since August 2023 for "school safety" services.

Under a cloud, Chancellor David C. Banks and Deputy Mayor Philip Banks III each resigned in the month of October 2024. David C. Banks tried to have his resignation at a later date, but said that Adams had "accelerated" the timeline of his resignation.

=== Winnie Greco investigation ===
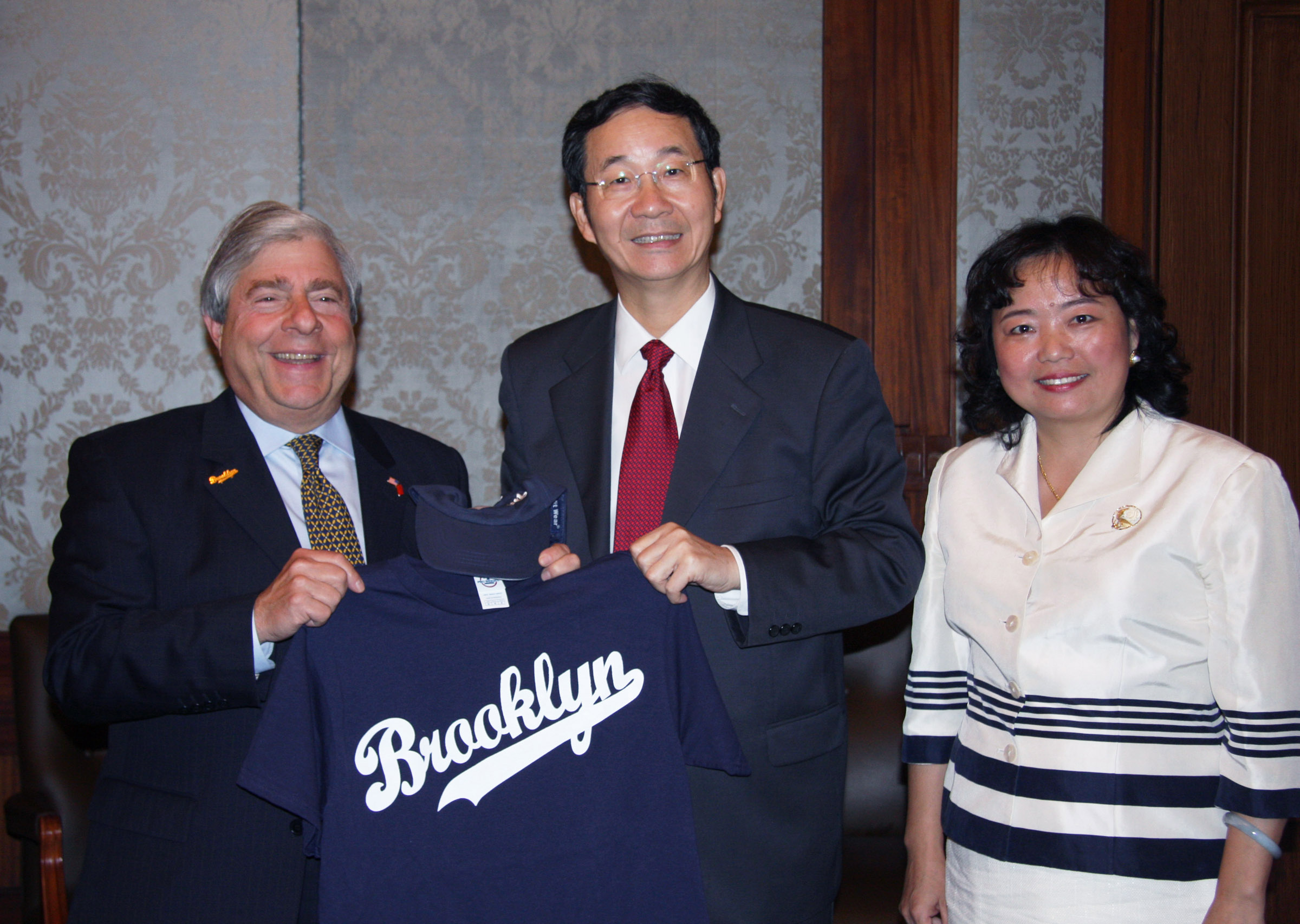
Greco (right), a longtime figure within New York City's Chinese community, joins Sun Guoxiang (center) and Marty Markowitz in 2011.

On February 29, 2024, the FBI searched New World Mall and two houses owned by Winnie Greco (Chinese: 郑祺蓉; pinyin: Zhèng Qíróng), Adams's Asian affairs advisor and a close aide of the mayor. Greco was also a prominent fundraiser for Adams's 2021 mayoral campaign. Greco reportedly maintained ties to united front organizations and raised money by via straw donors through a non-profit called the Alliance of Asian American Friends. The investigation is being conducted by the United States Attorney for the Eastern District of New York.

More than a year later, after an August 20 fundraiser for Adams, Greco attempted to give a reporter from The City cash in a red envelope that itself was hidden in a bag of potato chips. Greco's lawyer told The City that "Winnie’s intent was purely innocent. In the Chinese culture, money is often given to others in a gesture of friendship and gratitude." The Adams campaign suspended Greco's involvement. The New York Times reported that Greco had also been present at three Adams campaign events the previous month at which supporters handed cash to others, including to reporters from Chinese-language news outlets.

=== City leases investigation ===
The Manhattan district attorney's office opened a further corruption investigation on October 9 on the city corruptly leasing commercial property. According to a source in The New York Times, the focus is on possible bribery and money laundering, among other possible crimes.

The Southern District of New York served a grand jury subpoena to Ingrid Lewis-Martin, chief advisor to Adams since 2022, and took her phone as she returned to New York from a trip to Japan. She was accompanied by fellow Adams administration member and attorney Jesse Hamilton and Cushman & Wakefield real estate broker Diana Boutross, whose phones were also seized at the airport by the New York County District Attorney. Friends of Lewis-Martin and Boutross describe them to the Times as close friends of each other. At the same time, Lewis-Martin's home in Brooklyn was also searched. State investigators tied to the New York County District Attorney were present at both scenes.

=== Other phone seizures ===
Timothy Pearson, a retired police inspector, Adams's former supervisor in the NYPD, and senior advisor and one his aides and confidants, had his phone seized by federal agents. It's unclear what investigation Pearson's phone seizure relates to.

The phone of Sheena Wright, the NYC deputy mayor and fiancé of David Banks, was also seized.

== Indictment of Eric Adams in the Southern District of New York ==
United States v. Adams
- Seal of the U.S. District Court for the Southern District of New York
- Court: United States District Court for the Southern District of New York
- Full case name: United States of America v. Eric Adams
- Docket nos.: 24-cr-556
- Charge: Bribery (1 count); Solicitation of contributions by foreign nationals (2 counts); Conspiracy to commit wire fraud (1 count); Wire fraud (1 count)

Court membership
- Judge sitting: Dale Ho (District Judge)

The US Attorney for the Southern District of NY holds a press conference detailing the charges against Adams on September 26, 2024. Speaking are US Attorney Damian Williams, FBI Assistant Director in Charge James Dennehy, and NYC Department of Investigation Commissioner Jocelyn Strauber.

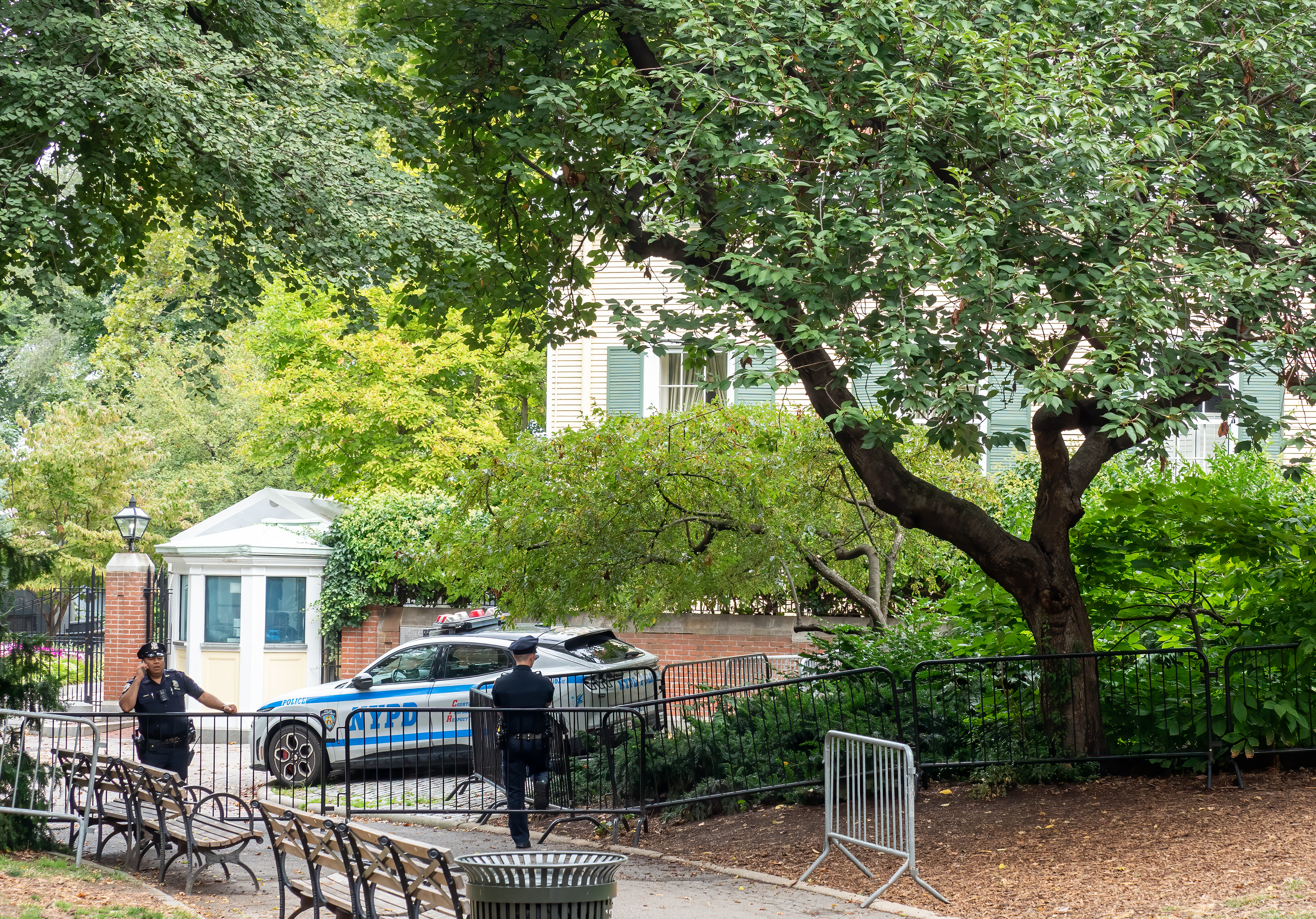
Police outside Gracie Mansion on the day of Adams's arraignment

On September 25, 2024, The New York Times reported Adams had been indicted by a grand jury on federal criminal charges. The following morning, FBI agents entered his official residence at Gracie Mansion and seized his phone. On September 26, the case against Adams was assigned, unsealing the indictment and revealing the charges against him, which are as follows:

- 1 count of conspiracy to defraud the United States (18 U.S.C. § 371)
- 1 count of wire fraud (18 U.S.C. § 1343 and 2)
- 2 counts of solicitation of a contribution by a foreign national (52 U.S.C. § 30121, 30109(d)(1)(A), and 2)
- 1 count of bribery (18 U.S.C. § 666(a)(1)(B))

Damian Williams, the U.S. attorney in Manhattan, claimed that Adams took over $100,000 in bribes from Turkey in exchange for using his powers to help open the Turkevi Center. These bribes mostly took the form of free and discounted luxury travel benefits. These benefits included free hotel rooms, free meals at high-end restaurants, free entertainment while in Turkey, free and heavily discounted flights, and similarly free and discounted flight class upgrades. In exchange for these perks, Adams pressured the New York City Fire Department to approve the opening of a new Turkish consular building without a fire inspection. The indictment claims that the building would have failed the fire inspection, and that the FDNY official responsible for the building assessment was told he would lose his job if he did not allow the building to open.

The indictment alleges Adams deliberately omitted the gifts' value from his annual New York City Conflicts of Interest Board disclosures, and notes communications suggestive of a cover-up. The indictment also alleges that Adams and his Turkish contacts conspired to hide the ultimate source of campaign contributions through an illegal straw donor scheme that defrauded the matching funds of the New York City Campaign Finance Board. The indictment also notes that Turkish officials pressed a staffer for assurances that Adams would boycott 2022 commemorations of the Armenian Genocide Remembrance Day, in line with Turkey's official policy of Armenian genocide denial, and that Adams appeared to comply with the request.

Adams is the first sitting mayor of New York City to have been indicted on federal crimes and pleaded not guilty on September 27.

=== Related arrest ===
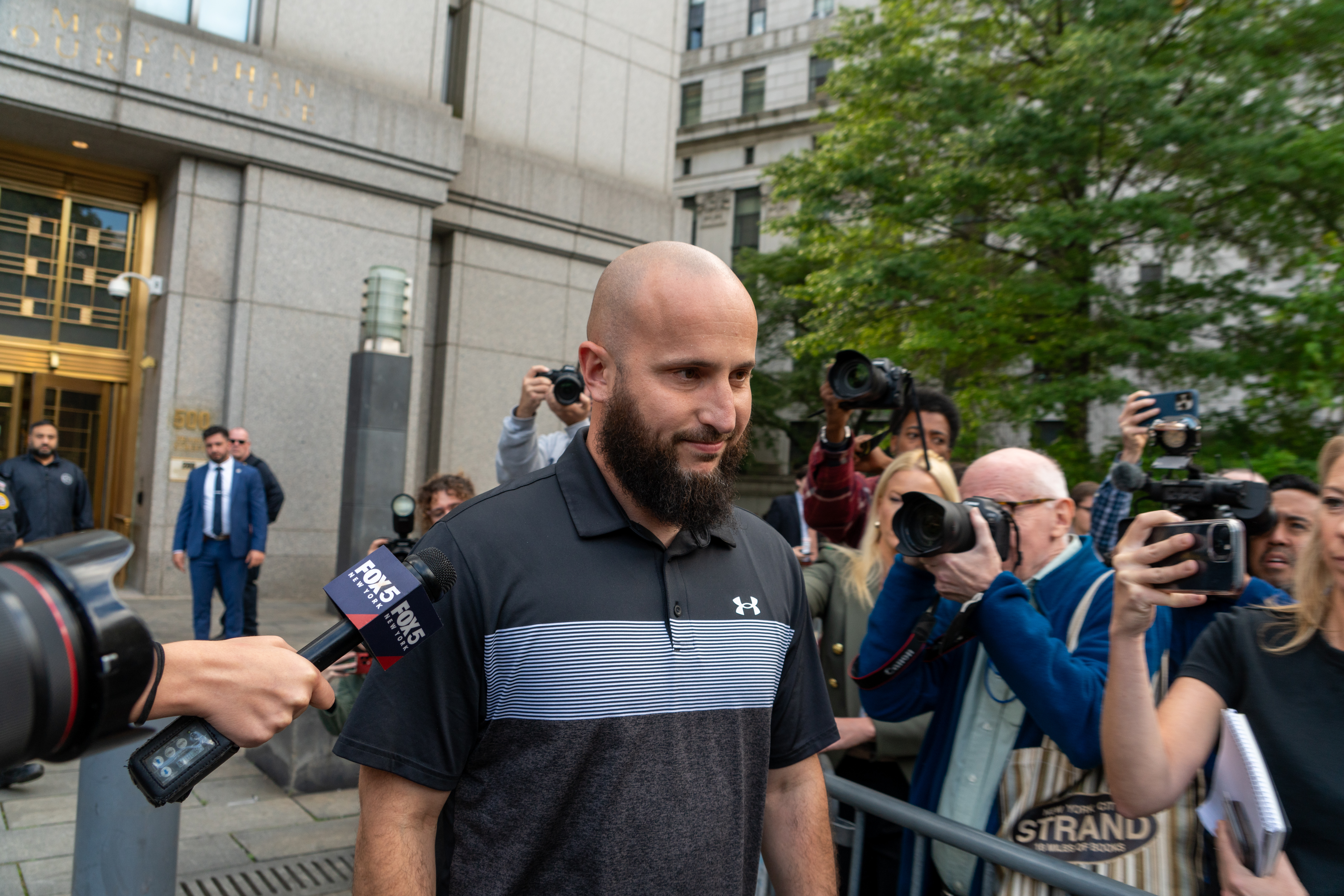
Mohamed Bahi exiting federal court after arraignment

On October 8, 2024, Mohamed Bahi, Mayor Adams's Chief Liaison to the Muslim community, who was believed to have played a prominent role in encouraging witnesses to lie and destroying evidence in connection with illegal contributions to Adams's mayoral campaign, was arrested and charged with witness tampering and destruction of evidence.

Bahi was charged the day after he resigned as the Adams administration's chief liaison to the Muslim community. The same day, Bahi was arraigned in Manhattan federal court, where his bail was set at $250,000. Bahi would not enter a plea during his arraignment. He faced up to 20 years of prison time on each count.

=== Dismissal with prejudice ===
Adams' indictment was dismissed with prejudice in April 2025 by judge Dale Ho, who wrote that the court "cannot force the Department of Justice to prosecute a defendant." Ho highlighted that the dismissal was "not about whether Mayor Adams is innocent or guilty"; the dismissal "does not express any opinion as to the merits of the case or whether the prosecution of Mayor Adams 'should' move forward".

Ho commented that the Justice Department's dismissal request "smacks of a bargain: dismissal of the Indictment in exchange for immigration policy concessions", while rejecting the Justice Department's argument that the case against Adams was election interference, as Adams' case was "entirely consistent with prior public corruption prosecutions".

Ho declined to dismiss without prejudice as requested by the Justice Department, as Ho wrote that doing so risked Adams becoming seemingly "more beholden to the demands of the federal government than to the wishes of his own constituents", as it would appear that Adams' "freedom depends on his ability to carry out the immigration enforcement priorities" of the Trump administration.

=== Responses to the indictment ===
There have been many responses to the investigation and indictment of Adams, dividing on the questions of whether the charges were fair and whether Adams should remain in office while awaiting trial.

==== Public opinion ====
A Marist College poll conducted from September 30 to October 1, 2024, of 1,073 registered voters in New York City found that 65% of respondents believed Adams had committed illegal acts, and 70% wanted him to resign; if he does not resign, 63% wanted Hochul to remove him. By March 2025, Adams's approval rating had fallen to just 20%, the lowest in the nearly 30-year history of Quinnipiac University's NYC mayoral polling.

==== Statements of support for Adams ====
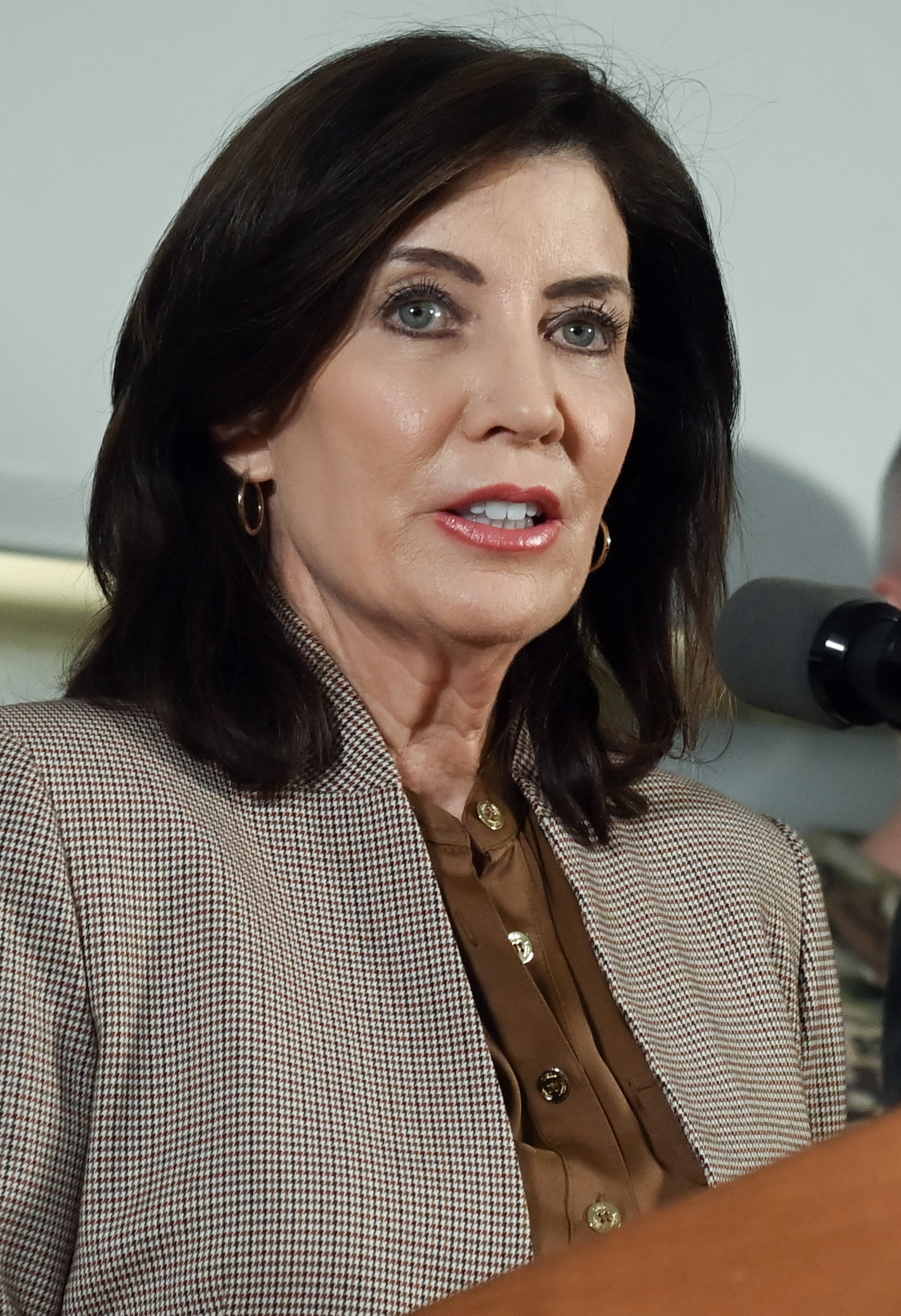
Kathy Hochul

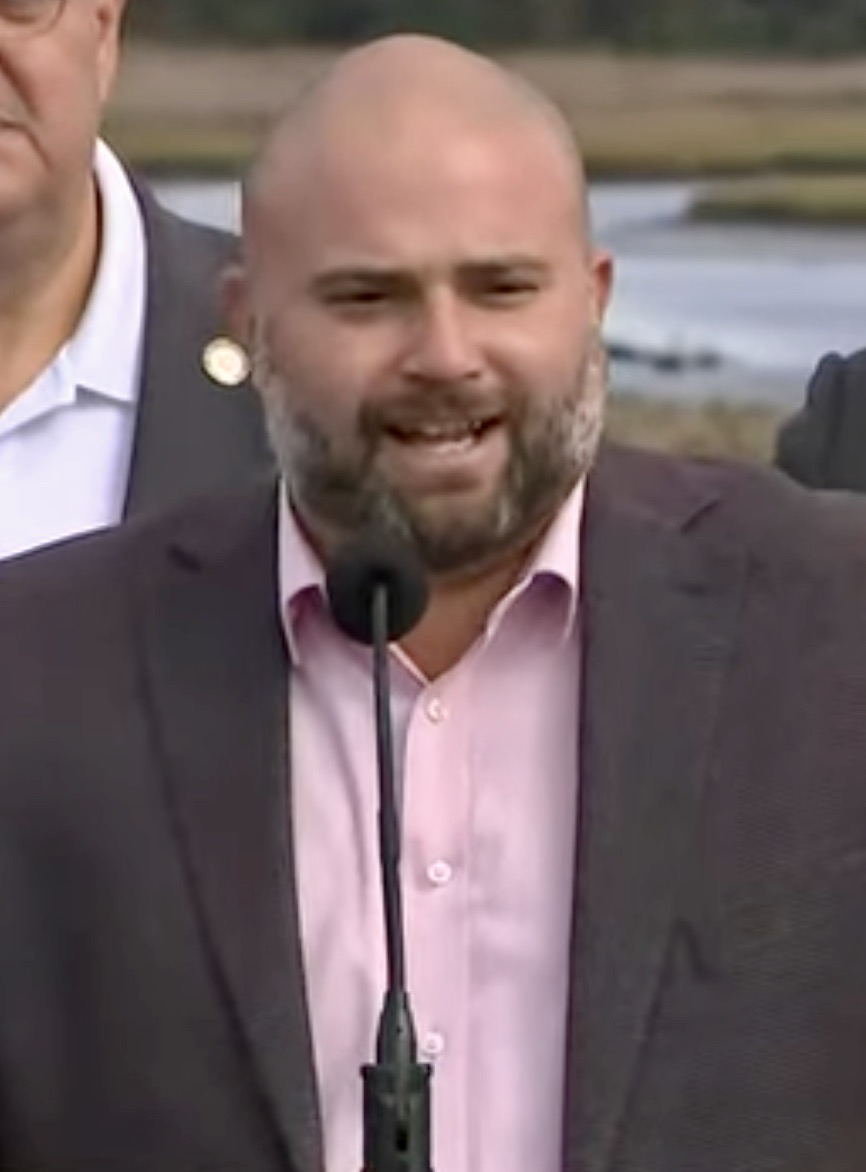
Joe Borelli

Months ahead of his indictment, Adams named a number of his allies as fundraisers for of his legal defense fund. These allies made statements in support of Adams after the indictment as well:

- Rodneyse Bichotte Hermelyn, State Assembly member and Chair of the Brooklyn Democratic Party
- Hazel Nell Dukes, former president of the NAACP
- Hakeem Jeffries, U.S. Representative and House Minority Leader
- David Paterson, former Governor of New York
- Jenifer Rajkumar, State Assembly member

Politico compared the rhetoric among Adams's supporters with Donald Trump's supporters, and noted the support of Republicans for Adams:

- New York City Council minority leader Joe Borelli defended Adams on Twitter.
- Representative Brandon Williams accused the investigation of being a "weaponization of the justice system" against Adams's critical comments towards President Joe Biden.
- The New York Post's editorial board questioned if the investigation could be political retribution.
- Donald Trump has claimed Adams is being politically persecuted for his stance on immigration and would consider offering Adams a pardon upon returning to the presidency.

Tablet editor-in-chief Liel Leibovitz opined that Jews should stand with Adams, "a hero to Jews and New Yorkers" for his "zero-tolerance approach to the Hamasniks in our streets".

National Action Network founder Al Sharpton told the press, "I have known Eric Adams for 35 years. I've never known him to have any leanings towards criminality. He [deserves] due process." He also counseled Hochul against the use of her constitutional power to remove Adams.

==== Calls for Adams's resignation ====
On September 26, 2024, the day the indictment was unsealed, The New York Times editorial board ran the opinion article "Eric Adams Should Resign". The Staten Island Advance editorial of September 27 pressed for Adams's resignation, saying "We can't see Eric Adams focusing much on city business over the months he'll be dealing with the charges if he remains in office."

Dozens of elected officials, political groups, and other notable individuals called for Adams's resignation or removal, especially following his indictment, including:

United States Congress

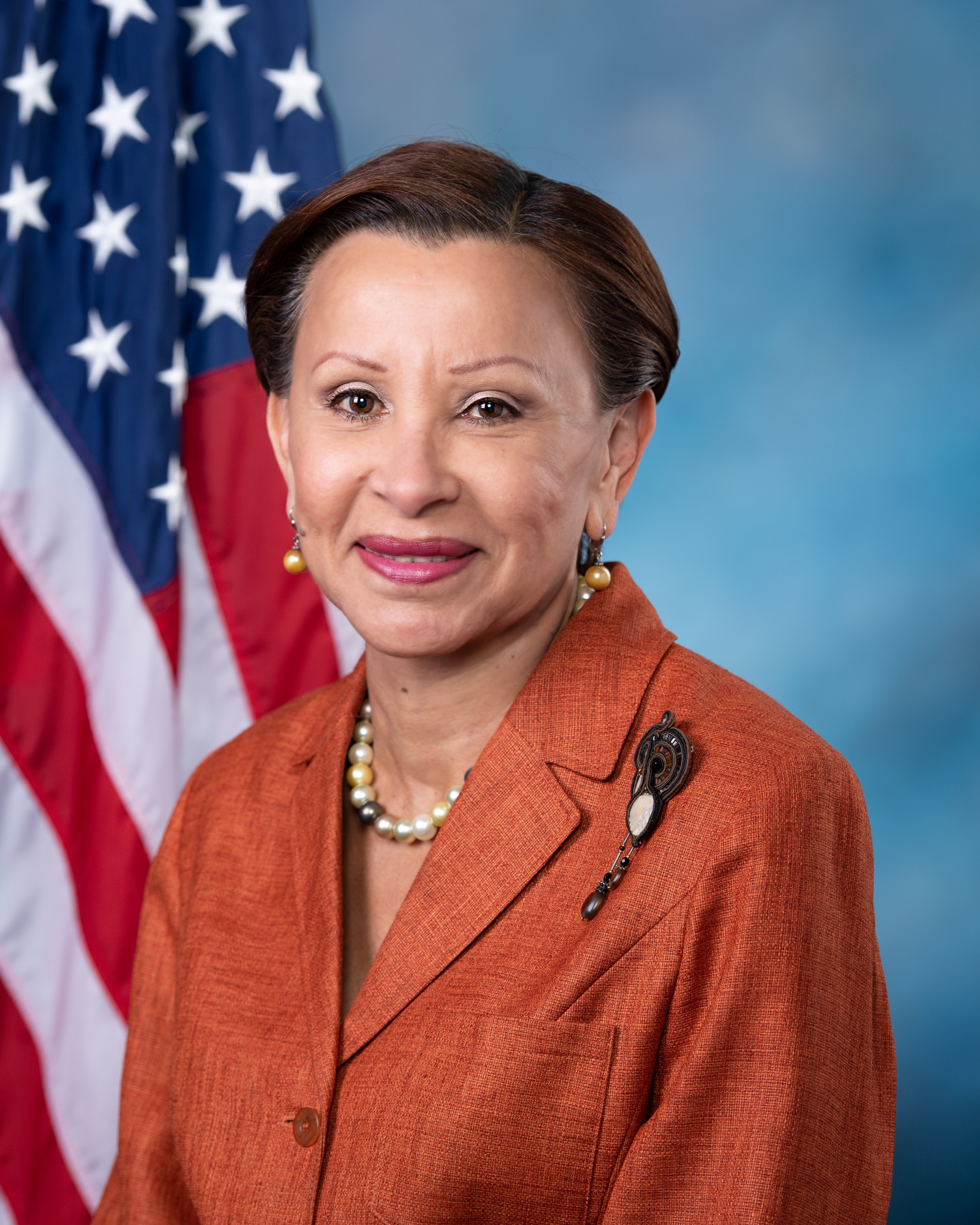
Nydia Velázquez

- Laura Gillen, Representative (D-NY-04)
- Nicole Malliotakis, Representative (R-NY-11)
- Jerry Nadler, Representative (D-NY-12)
- Alexandria Ocasio-Cortez, Representative (D-NY-14)
- Elise Stefanik, Representative (R-NY-21)
- Ritchie Torres, Representative (D-NY-15)
- Nydia M. Velazquez, Representative (D-NY-07)

Statewide officials

- Antonio Delgado, Lieutenant Governor

New York State Senators

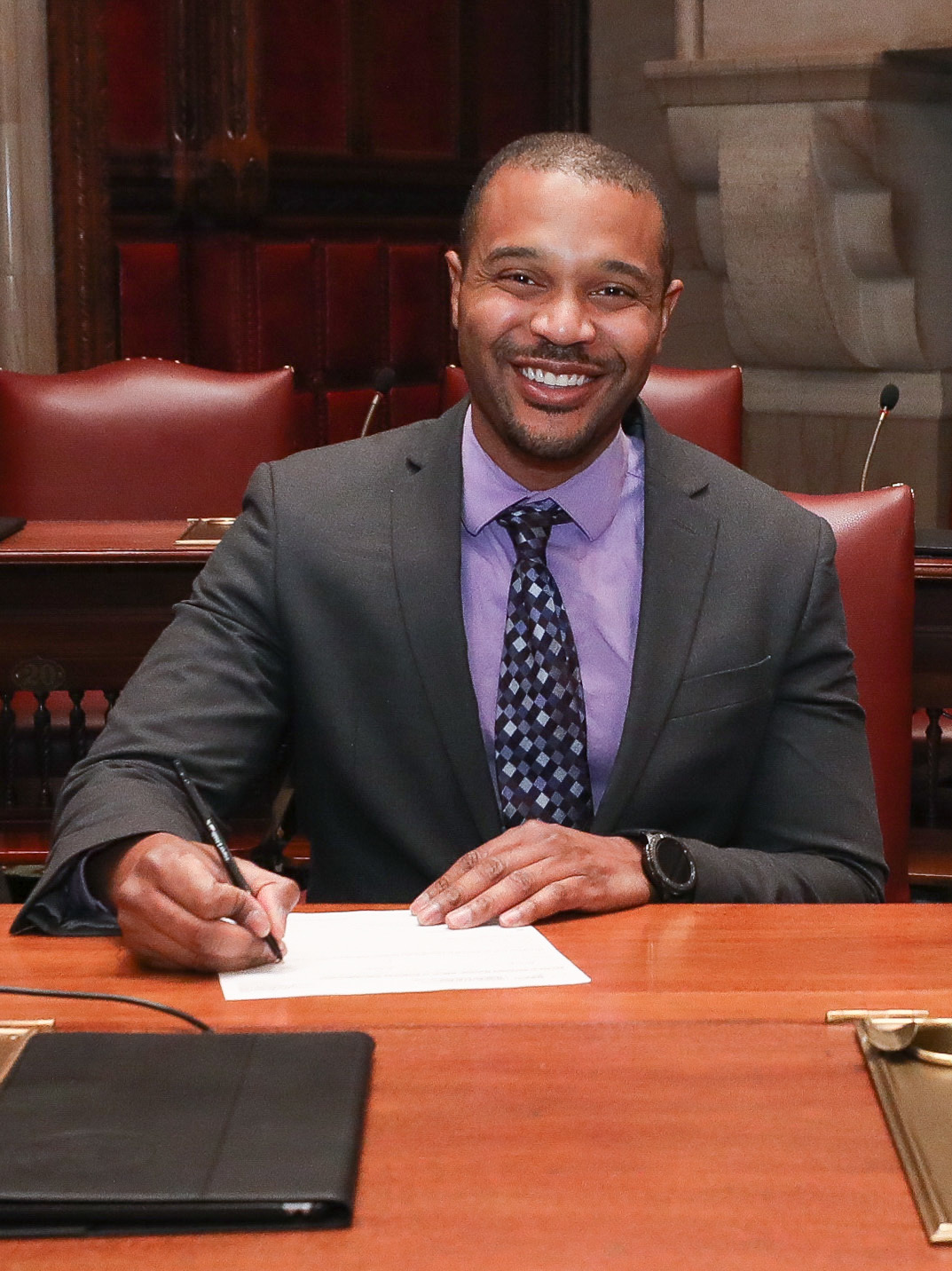
Jabari Brisport

- Jabari Brisport
- Iwen Chu
- Michael Gianaris, Deputy Majority Leader
- Kristen Gonzalez
- Andrew Gounardes
- Brad Hoylman-Sigal
- Liz Krueger
- John Liu
- *Zellnor Myrie
- *Jessica Ramos
- Gustavo Rivera
- Julia Salazar
- Andrea Stewart-Cousins, Majority Leader

New York State Assembly Members

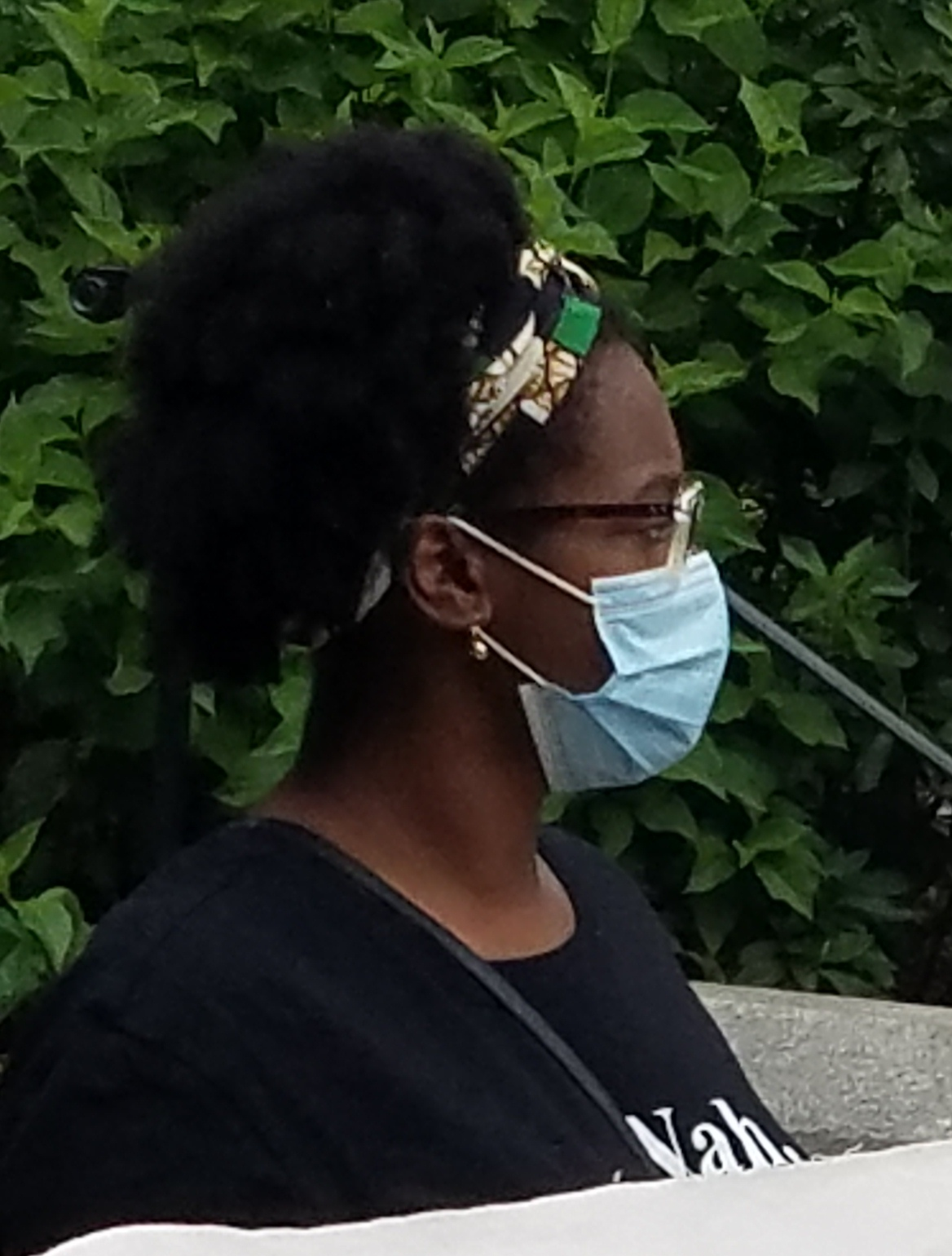
Phara Souffrant Forrest

- Robert Carroll
- Harvey Epstein
- Phara Souffrant Forrest
- Emily Gallagher
- Jessica González-Rojas
- Grace Lee
- *Zohran Mamdani
- Marcela Mitaynes
- Daniel J. O'Donnell
- Karines Reyes
- Linda Rosenthal
- Sarahana Shrestha
- Jo Anne Simon
- Tony Simone
- Claire Valdez

Citywide officials

- * **Brad Lander, Comptroller
- Jumaane Williams, Public Advocate

Borough Presidents

- Antonio Reynoso, Brooklyn

New York City Council Members

- Shaun Abreu
- * **Adrienne Adams, Speaker
- Alexa Avilés
- Chris Banks
- Erik Bottcher
- Justin Brannan
- Tiffany Cabán
- Carmen De La Rosa
- Oswald Feliz
- Jennifer Gutiérrez
- Shahana Hanif
- Robert Holden
- Crystal Hudson
- Rita Joseph
- Shekar Krishnan
- Linda Lee
- Sandy Nurse
- Chi Ossé
- Lincoln Restler
- Julie Won

Other notable figures and organizations

- *Michael Blake, former New York State Assembly member and Democratic National Committee vice chair
- *Scott Stringer, former New York City comptroller and 2021 New York City mayoral candidate
- Andrew Yang, 2021 New York City mayoral candidate and 2020 presidential candidate
- Chivona Newsome, co-founder of the Black Lives Matter Greater New York chapter
- The New York City Democratic Socialists of America chapter

* Declared candidacy in the upcoming 2025 New York City mayoral election.
**Member of the five-person Inability Committee that could initiate the mayor's removal with four votes.

=== City officials' resignations ===
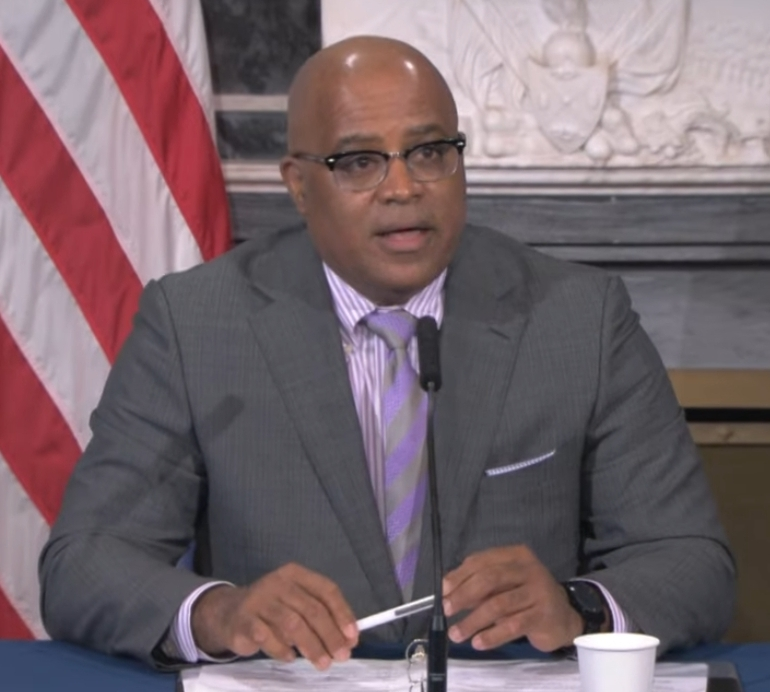
Philip Banks III

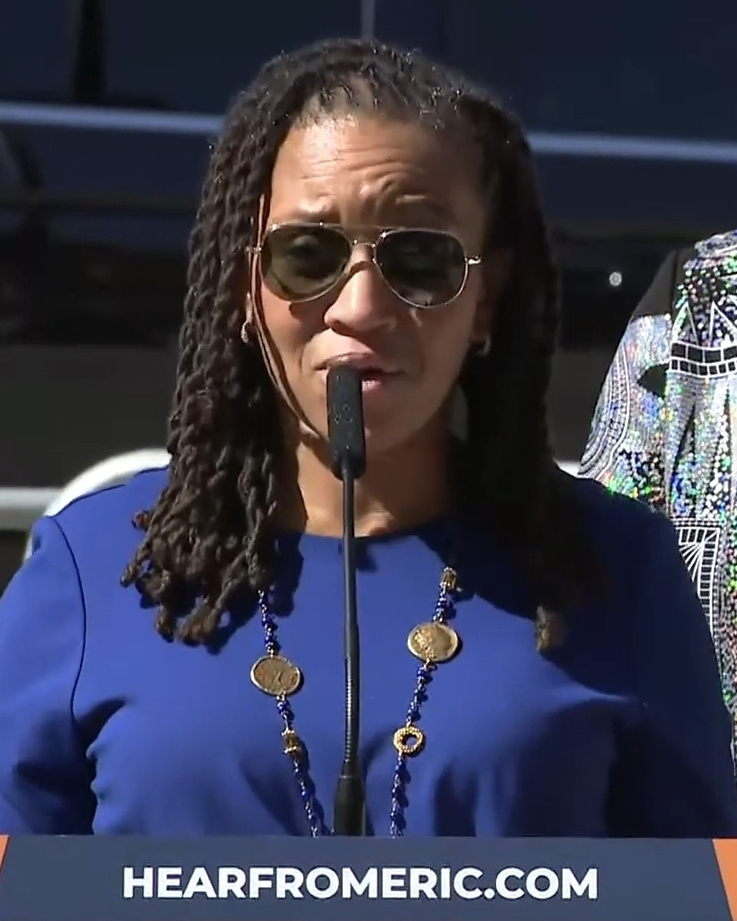
Sheena Wright

Before and after the Adams indictment, a number of city officials resigned from his administration, including:

- Mohamed Bahi, the mayor's Chief Liaison to the Muslim community
- David C. Banks, Schools Chancellor
- Philip Banks III, Deputy Mayor for Public Safety
- Edward Caban, Police Commissioner
- Ahsan Chutgai, Adams's senior Muslim adviser
- Winnie Greco, Adams's Asian affairs advisor
- Kristen Kaufman, a Deputy Commissioner in the Mayor's Office for International Affairs
- Ingrid Lewis-Martin, Adams's chief adviser
- Timothy Pearson, Economic Development Corporation staff, longtime Adams confidant and advisor
- Ashwin Vasan, Health Commissioner
- Sheena Wright, first deputy mayor
- Lisa Zornberg, former counsel and chief legal advisor to the Mayor
- On February 17, 2025, it was reported that four of the eight deputy mayors under Adams would be resigning:
  - Maria Torres-Springer
  - Anne Williams-Isom
  - Meera Joshi
  - Chauncey Parker

== Continued investigations and indictments ==
After charges against Adams were dropped in Southern District of New York, investigations and criminal prosecutions continued into a number of Adams administration officials and associates.

=== Eric Ulrich criminal trial ===
In September 2026, businessmen Anthony and Joseph Liveri plead guilty to charges in 2026, admitting to handing Department of Buildings Commissioner Eric Ulrich $4,000 in an envelope to get rid of a city Building Department vacate order on a Brooklyn bakery.

In his own criminal case, Ulrich has requested a bench trial. Opening arguments are set for October 19, 2026.

=== Lewis-Martin and Hamilton investigations and indictments ===
Ingrid Lewis-Martin, a chief advisor, was issued a grand jury subpoena on September 27 by the US Attorney's Office relating to the Adams case. On December 15, 2024, Lewis-Martin resigned from her position as chief adviser, with the mayor's office framing her departure as a "planned retirement". Lewis-Martin's departure followed a high-profile legal inquiry into allegations that she had accepted improper gifts during her time in office. She has publicly denied these accusations, stating that she "never took any gifts, money, or anything" while in her role and had not made arrangements for others to receive benefits on her behalf.

The investigation into Lewis-Martin intensified in late September 2024, when prosecutors from the Manhattan District Attorney's Office searched her home and seized her personal phones. Upon returning from a flight from Japan, she was met at the airport by both federal and Manhattan prosecutors. The investigation involved a grand jury, which invited Lewis-Martin to testify, but she declined. Her lawyer, Arthur Aidala, asserted that the investigation was politically motivated and that the grand jury's decision was predetermined.

In August 2025, a New York County grand jury indicted Lewis-Martin and Department of Citywide Administrative Services official Jesse Hamilton for several bribery schemes in which they allegedly accepted cash and other benefits in exchange for actions on behalf of the Adams administration. Also indicted were several fundraisers for Eric Adams, Broadway Stages founders Gina and Anthony "Tony" Argento, businessman Tian Ji Li, and developer Yechiel Landau.

=== New York City Sheriff's Office and Anthony Miranda ===
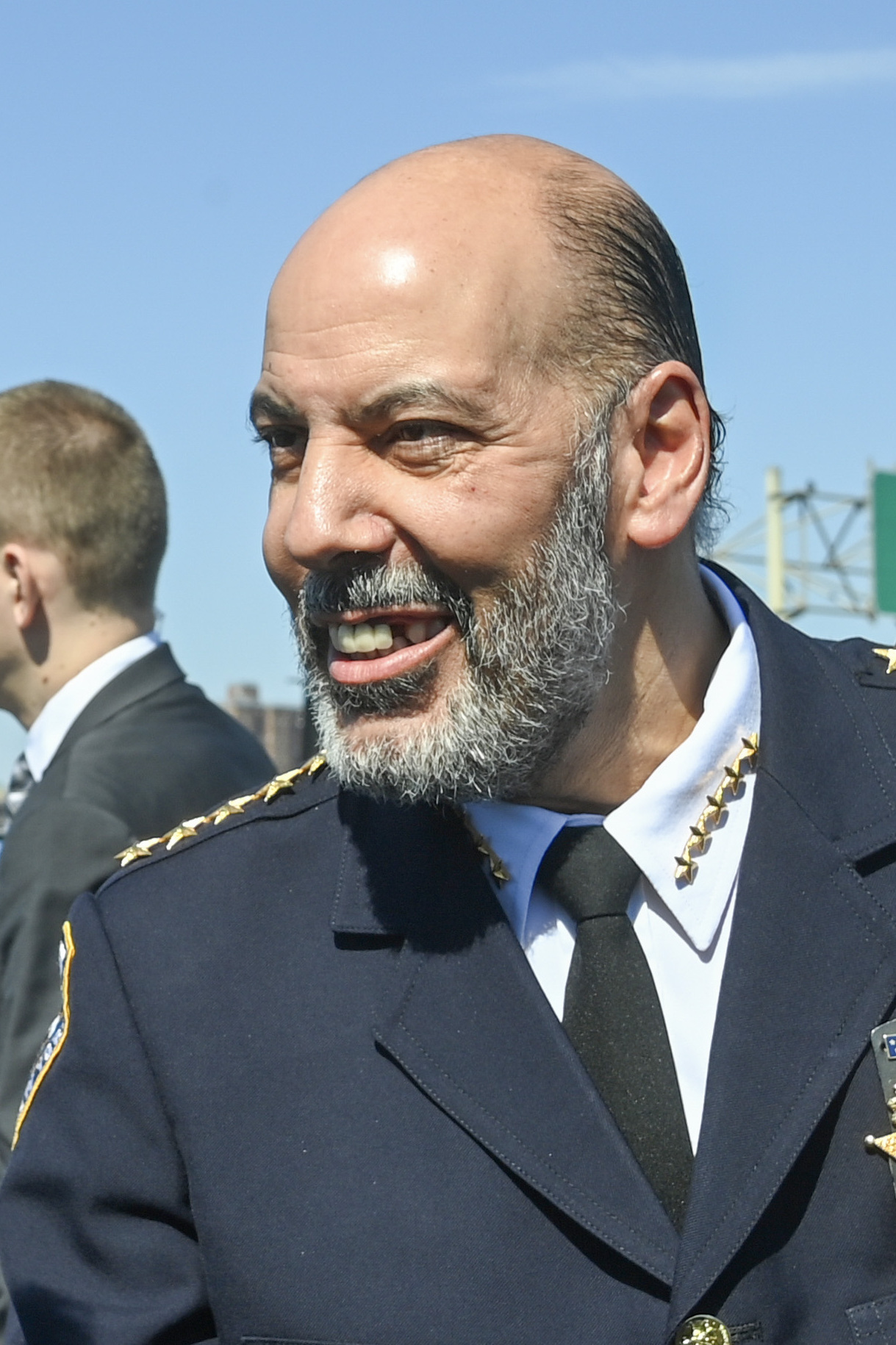
Sheriff Anthony Miranda, photographed 2024

In 2024, New York City Department of Investigation raided Queens offices of the New York City Sheriff Anthony Miranda. Reports indicate the raid was seeking cash and records kept by the Sheriff's Office, part of controversies surrounding chain of custody following the Sheriff's closure of unlicensed cannabis dispensaries.

In 2026, after Miranda was replaced as Sheriff, federal subpoenas were served upon several associates of Miranda, and raids conducted on Miranda's property in Puerto Rico. According to the New York Times, subpoenas mentioned possible "federal program fraud or bribery, wire fraud, money laundering, witness tampering and interstate travel in aid of racketeering" and were seeking records related to British American Tobacco and two of its subsidiaries, Reynolds American and R.J. Reynolds Tobacco Company. The New York City Sheriff's Office collects tobacco taxes and investigates tobacco-related crimes in New York City.

=== Indictment of Frank Carone and associates ===
United States v. Frank V. Carone
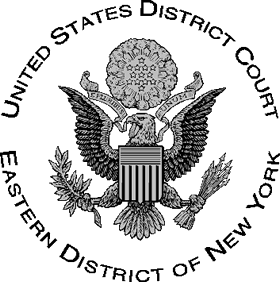
- Court: United States District Court for the Eastern District of New York
- Started: June 12, 2026
- Docket nos.: 1:26-cr-177
- Charge: Travel Act bribery; Bribery concerning programs receiving Federal funds; Honest services fraud; Money laundering; Obstruction of justice; Tax fraud.

Court membership
- Judge sitting: Kiyo A. Matsumoto

On June 24, 2026, Adams's former chief of staff Frank Carone was arrested for an alleged bribery scheme. Frank Carone's brother Anthony was also arrested as part of the scheme.

The indictment unsealed in the United States District Court for the Eastern District of New York charges Frank and Anthony Carone with violations of the Travel Act, bribery concerning programs receiving Federal funds, honest services fraud, money laundering, obstruction of justice, and tax fraud. Unnamed but listed as "Relevant Individuals" include Adams's appointees to the New York City Department of Social Services and New York City Department of Homeless Services.

The alleged scheme involved the Carones accepting bribes to corruptly steer federally-supported funds for housing the homeless to hoteliers Yan Po Zhu and Crystal Chen, and using several means to obscure the bribes' paper trails.
