= New World Mall =

Shopping mall in Queens, New York

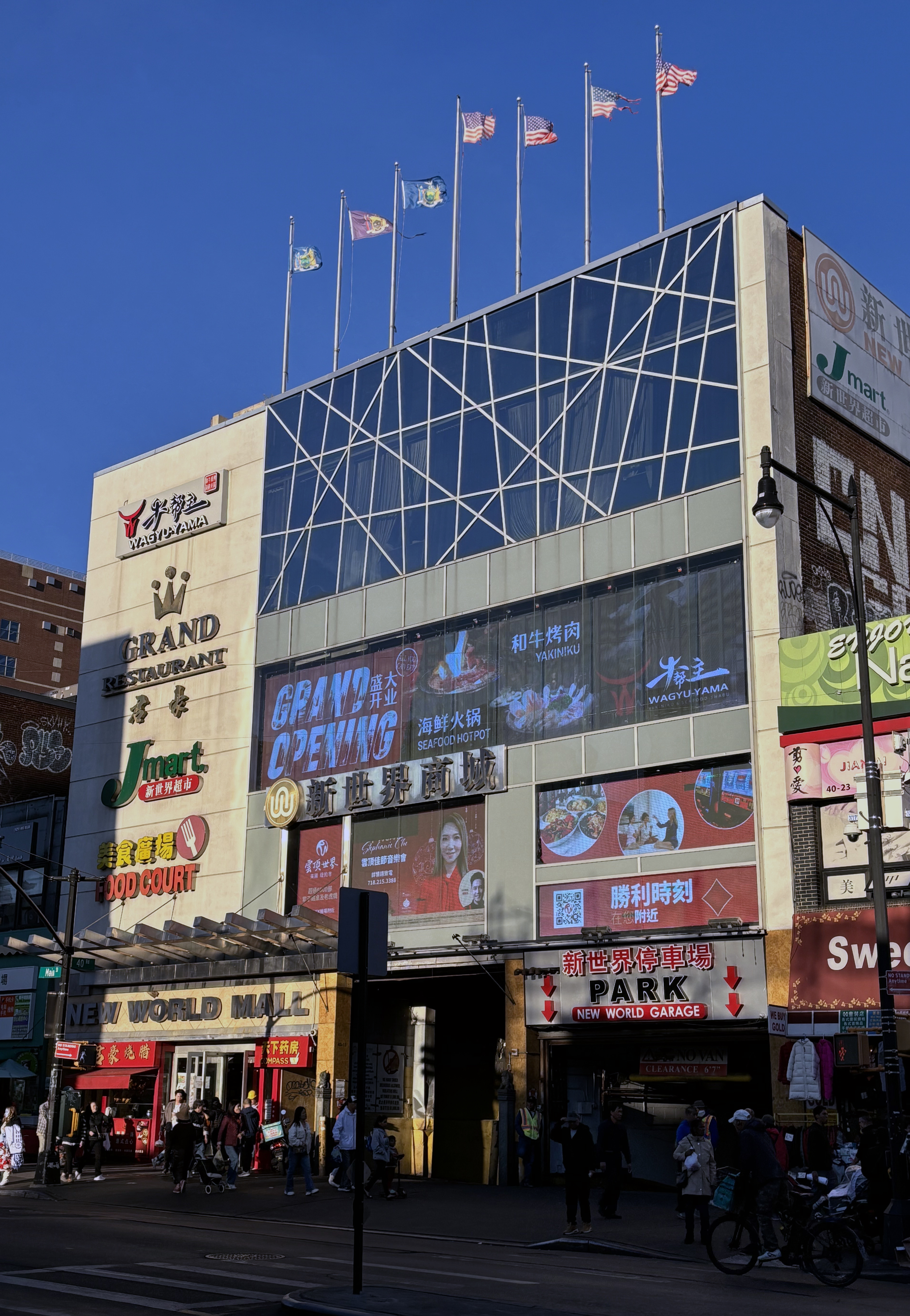
- Main Street entrance in 2024
- Coordinates: 40°45′34″N 73°49′45″W
- Address: 136-20 Roosevelt Avenue, Flushing, New York 11354; United States
- Opened: May 22, 2011
- Floor area: 165,000 sq. ft.
- Floors: 4
- Parking: 350
- Public transit: Subway: at Flushing–Main Street; LIRR: Flushing–Main Street
- Website: www.newworldmallny.com

New World Mall
- Chinese: 新世界商城
- Literal meaning: New World Mall
Transcriptions
Standard Mandarin
- Hanyu Pinyin: xīn shì jiè shāng chéng
Yue: Cantonese
- Jyutping: san1 sai3 gaai3 soeng1 sing4

New World Mall is an Asian-themed shopping mall located at 136‑20 Roosevelt Avenue in Flushing Chinatown in Flushing, Queens, New York City. The mall was the largest Asian shopping mall in the Northeastern United States upon its opening in 2011.

== Features ==
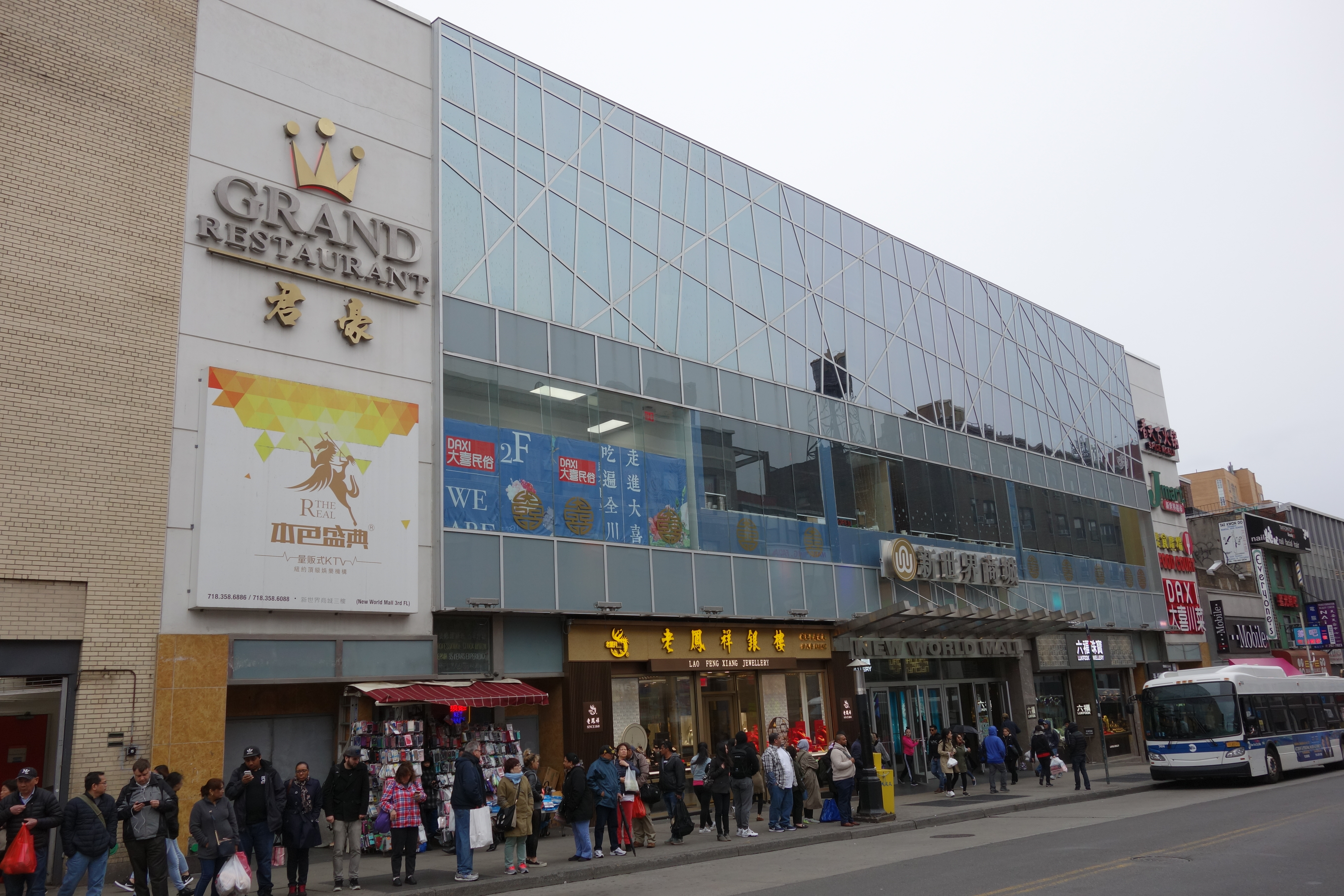
Roosevelt Avenue entrance in 2018

New World Mall is a four-level, 165,000-square-foot (15,300 m^{2}) shopping mall that adjoins onto Roosevelt Avenue and Main Street in the Flushing neighborhood of Queens in New York City. The basement is occupied by a food court, the first and second floors are occupied by retail, and the third floor is occupied by a banquet hall and dim sum restaurant. A 45,000-square-foot (4,200 m^{2}) Jmart grocery store serves as the anchor tenant for New World Mall, and the mall also contains a 350-spot underground parking garage. Upon its opening in 2011, the mall was the largest Asian shopping mall in the Northeastern United States.

== History ==
The building that New World Mall occupies was originally an S. Klein department store, which became an Alexander's in 1975, and then a Caldor. It had four levels with a combined 185,000 square feet (17,200 m^{2}), in addition to a 340-space parking garage in the basement. After Caldor closed in 1999, the property was left shuttered until 2011. There was a proposal to convert the building into a shopping mall to be named the Flushing Expo Mall in 2002, but this effort failed. A subsequent plan to convert the building into a Walmart was canceled in April 2006.

Petitions to renovate the building into the New World Mall were filed in August 2009. The plans called for chain stores on the first story, a supermarket on the second story, and an Asian food court on the third story. Though the mall was originally planned to open in September 2010, the opening date was pushed back. The grand opening took place on May 22, 2011.

=== Notable incidents ===
On August 6, 2020, amid the COVID-19 pandemic in New York City, New World Mall was shut down by the New York City Department of Buildings after it was found to be open in violation of state-mandated COVID guidelines. The mall was partially reopened the following day after the violations were resolved by the building operators.

In August 2023, The City reported that New World Mall was connected to an illegal straw donation scheme for New York City mayor Eric Adams during and subsequent to his 2021 mayoral campaign. The report alleged that fraudulent donations were made to Adams in the name of mall workers to exploit New York's matching funds program for political donations; the mall's banquet hall was additionally the site of multiple campaign fundraising events organized by Adams advisor Winnie Greco. On February 29, 2024, New World Mall and Greco's two homes were raided by the FBI as a part of their broader investigation into the Eric Adams administration. At the time, the mall was operated by the family of Lian Wu Shao.
