= Mohamed Bahi =

American community activist and city employee

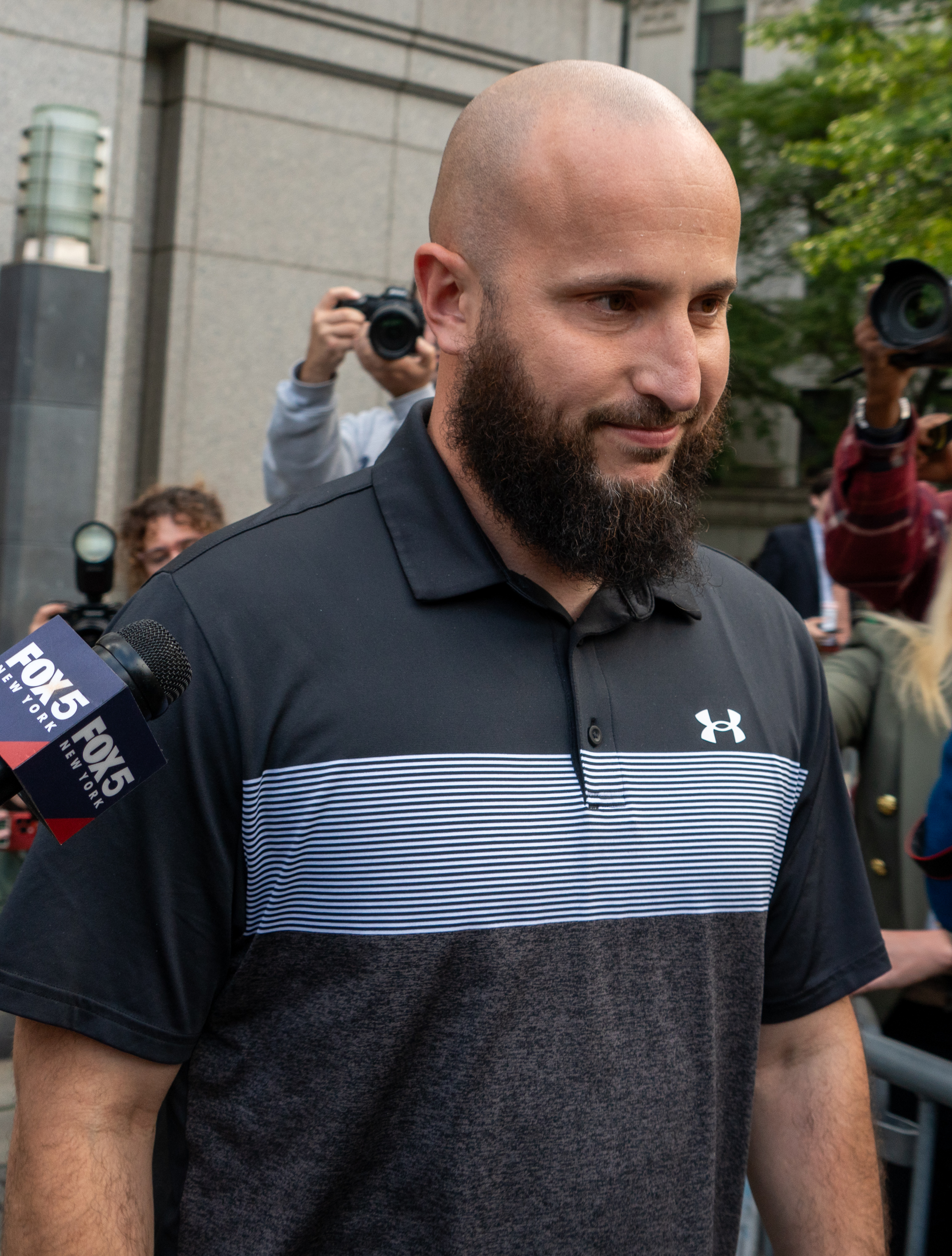
- Bahi exiting federal court, October 2024
- Born: 1984 (age 41–42); Algeria
- Citizenship: American-Algerian
- Title: Chief Liaison of NYC Mayor Eric Adams to the Muslim community (2022–2024)

Mohamed Bahi (also spelled "Bahe"; born 1984) (Note: Bahi's age was published as 40 in February 2025 and 41 in August 2025. This is only possible if he was born between February and August 1984.) is an indicted criminal and American-Algerian Muslim community activist, and the former Chief Liaison of New York City Mayor Eric Adams to the Muslim community. On October 8, 2024, as part of the investigations into the Adams administration, Bahi was arrested and charged with federal witness tampering and destruction of evidence in connection with alleged illegal contributions made to Adams's 2021 mayoral campaign. On August 12, 2025, Bahi pleaded guilty to conspiracy to commit wire fraud, with sentencing scheduled for November.

== Early and personal life ==
Bahi was born in Algeria, and is Muslim. In 1993, he came to the United States with his family, at the age of nine. He lives in Staten Island, New York, with his wife and children. An article published about him stated:

The time after 9/11 was devastating for Muslims living in America. Women took off their hijabs, men were traumatized, and children were targetted. People who were named Mohamed started going by “Moe.” Many Muslims started hiding their faith from the public.

But for Mohamed Bahi – “September 11, for me, was a huge wake-up call. It connected me to my belief and made me the person I am today.”

This one time, one of his friends printed verses from the Quran about the unbelievers and Bahi did not know how to respond, except by repeating that “Islam was peace”. He decided to go to the mosque the next day and ask the Imam.

“I asked him ‘Is there a verse in the Quran that says “if you meet an unbeliever you chop their necks off”?’ And the Imam says, ‘Yes, there is a verse like that.’ And I’m like what the hell!?” Bahi explained. “He told me the verse was out of context and then he explained it to me.”

== Non-profit activity ==
Bahi took leadership of a non-profit center, Muslims Giving Back, providing Islamic community programming and meals since 2012. It originally operated from a mosque in Brighton Beach, Brooklyn. After a New York Police Department informant at the mosque engaged in surveillance of the center, the mosque evicted the group. Muslims Giving Back worked with the ACLU to file a lawsuit against the New York Police Department for its surveillance of the group. Bahi said: "To think that there was a whole force out there monitoring us, following us, reading our texts; that was madness." The center has subsequently operated in Sunset Park, Brooklyn.

Bahi also founded the Asiyah Women's Center in Brooklyn, providing shelter support. In 2018 he said that the center planned to apply for grants through then-Brooklyn Borough President Adams's office.

== NYC Chief Liaison to the Muslim Community ==
In 2022, Bahi became the Chief Liaison of New York City Mayor Eric Adams to the Muslim community in the mayor's community affairs office, at a salary of $80,000. As part of his duties, in July 2023 he and Adams met with members of the Uzbek community in New York City to discuss issues pertaining to the community. In January 2024, he was honored at the 8th Annual Recognition Event of the Bait-ul Jamaat House of Community in Staten Island. On October 7, 2024, Bahi resigned.

=== Indictment ===
On October 8, 2024, as part of the investigations into the Adams administration, Bahi was arrested by the FBI and charged with federal witness tampering – instructing four witnesses to lie to the FBI – and destruction of evidence. The criminal complaint was in connection with an investigation of alleged illegal contributions made to Adams's 2021 mayoral campaign. In the hours before federal agents seized Bahi's phone, he had abruptly deleted the encrypted messaging app called Signal, according to the complaint against him.

Prosecutors said that the five people who allegedly made the straw donations to the Adams campaign, and were instructed by Bahi to lie, all admitted their participation in the scheme. On August 12, 2025, Bahi pleaded guilty to conspiracy to commit wire fraud and agreed to a $32,000 restitution payment. On November 18, 2025, Bahi was sentenced to a three-year term of probation, with the first year to be served on home confinement. No term of incarceration was imposed. Bahe's sentencing and probation was contrast to what happened earlier in the year, in which the Justice Department controversially dropped all criminal charges against Adams himself, so that he could more effectively support the Trump administration's immigration crackdown.
