= Broadway Stages =

NYC film and television production company

Coordinates: 40.7287785°N 73.9480949°W

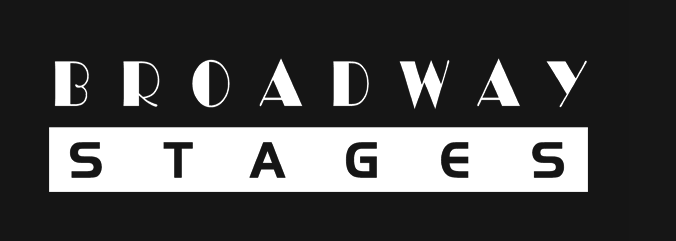
- Type: Studio
- Industry: Entertainment
- Founded: Brooklyn, New York, U.S. (1983)
- Founders: Gina Argento; Tony Argento
- Headquarters: Brooklyn, New York, United States
- Products: Motion pictures, television programs
- Website: Broadway Stages' Website

Broadway Stages, Ltd. is one of New York’s full-service film and television production companies, with its headquarters in Greenpoint, Brooklyn. Broadway Stages’ studios can be found throughout Brooklyn, Queens and Staten Island. As of 2018 it has over 3 million square feet of integrated space including soundstages, locations, production services and parking.

== History ==
Broadway Stages was founded in 1983 by Tony Argento who turned a rundown movie theatre on Broadway Street in Astoria, Queens into his first soundstage. There he filmed commercials, and music videos for musical artists such as Aretha Franklin, Beyonce, Jay-Z, Justin Timberlake, LL Cool-J, Eminem, Whitney Houston, Queen Latifah, Celine Dion, Will Smith, Hall & Oates, TLC, Busta Rhymes and others.

The company expanded to Brooklyn where additional soundstages were built in Greenpoint, broadening from music videos to television and film production. Tony’s sister and current President and CEO Gina Argento, joined Broadway Stages after graduating from college. Today the company manages over three million square feet of integrated space including unique locations, production services, and more than 50 soundstages across New York City.

In addition to New York City, Broadway Stages also has facilities in Pitman, NJ and Savannah, GA.

=== Locations and Services ===
Broadway Stages has its own unique locations, as well as a complete set of services for different sizes, styles, and types of productions. This includes office space for writers, sketch artists, construction, wardrobe, lighting, storage, equipment, and parking.

=== Kingsland Wildflowers Project ===
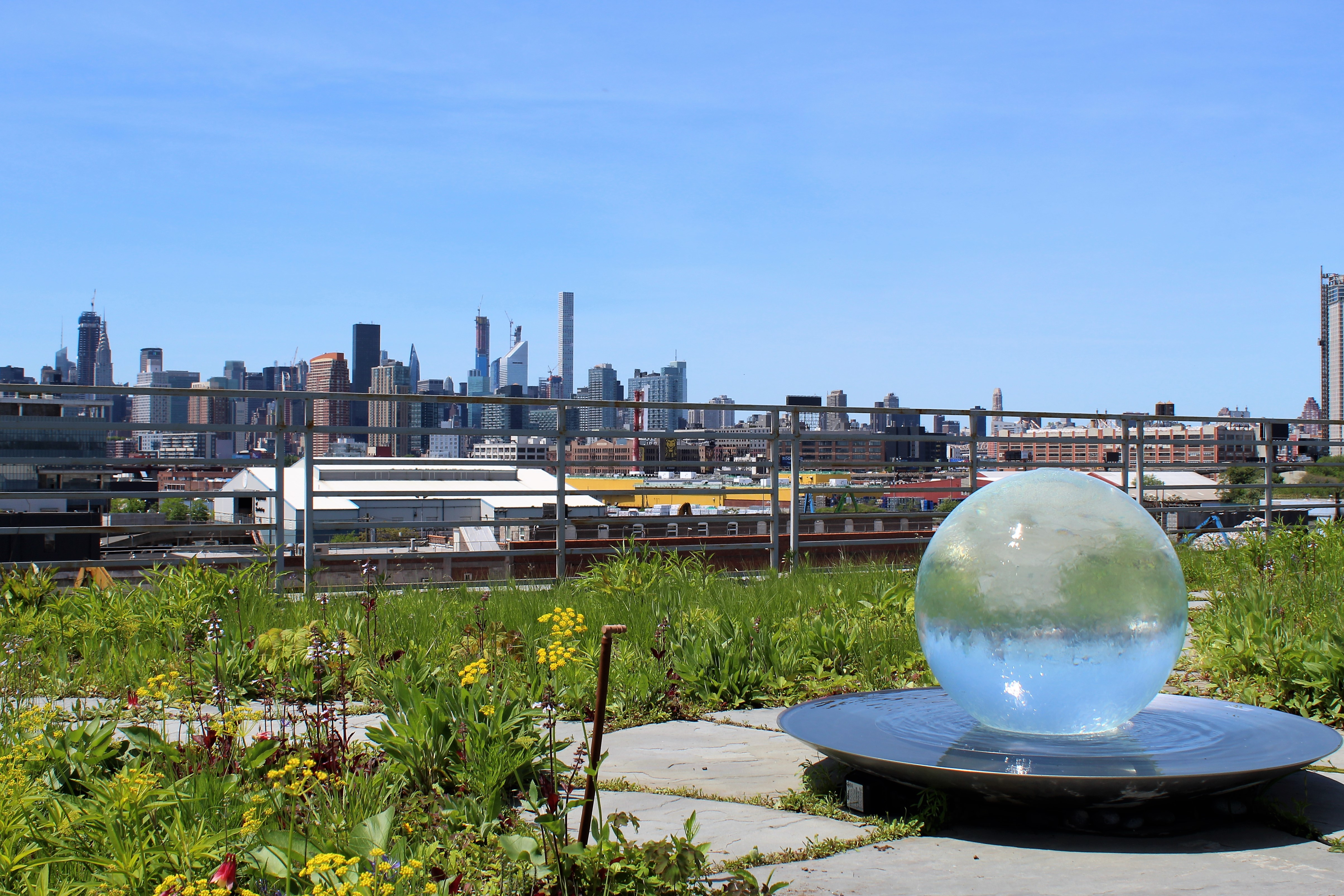
The rooftop of the Kingsland Wildflowers Green Roof & Community Engagement Center

In 2016 Broadway Stages collaborated with the New York City Audubon, Alive Structures and Newtown Creek Alliance to create a large-scale, half-acre green roof on top of their soundstage at 520 Kingsland Avenue in Greenpoint. It donated the space, matched initial funding from the Greenpoint Community Environmental Fund, and continues to provide financial support for the infrastructure and garden maintenance.

The green roof was designed by Alive Structures and features species native to the Long Island Sound coastal lowlands, including native grasses such as stout blue-eyed grass and northern drop seed, heart-leaved golden alexanders, and asclepias tuberosa or butterfly weed — a host plant for monarch butterflies that also produces silky seed pod fibers used by orioles and goldfinches in their nests.

This bird-friendly rooftop wildflower meadow not only attracts wildlife, but also diverts rainwater runoff, and provides educational programs throughout the year. The garden is maintained by Alive Structures and the New York City Audubon together with the Newtown Creek Alliance manage the year-round educational programs and oversee wildlife monitoring through bat and bird microphones and swallow houses installed on the green roof.

=== Eagle Street Rooftop Farm ===
In 2008 the company funded New York City’s first-ever year-round, fully operational organic rooftop farm at their Eagle Street soundstage. Aimed at advancing the health of the environment and educating Brooklyn citizens about green initiatives, Broadway Stages provided Goode Green with its warehouse rooftop as the setting for Rooftop Farms, a commercially operated green roof program used for urban farming. During growing season, the green-thumbs with Eagle Street Rooftop Farm who cultivate organic produce supply a Community Supported Agriculture (CSA) program, an onsite farmers market, and fresh produce to area restaurants. In partnership with the food education organization Growing Chefs, the Eagle Street Rooftop Farm also hosts a range of farm based educational and volunteer programs.

== Arthur Kill Correctional Facility ==
In August 2017, Broadway Stages acquired the former Arthur Kill Correctional Facility, located in the Charleston section of Staten Island, from the Empire State Development for $7 million. It is repairing the former prison and converting parts of it into five new soundstages.

While under contract, before the closing of the sale, Broadway Stages spent $3.5 million to bring the prison up to code and brought production to Staten Island. Movies and television shows including Orange is the New Black, The Sinner, Blindspot, Ocean's 8, The Good Cop, and Daredevil, have filmed in the Arthur Kill facility.

== Productions ==
The following are a list of some of the productions filmed at Broadway Stages' facilities:

- Unbreakable Kimmy Schmidt
- The Act (TV series)
- Billions
- Blacklist
- Broad City
- Blue Bloods
- Bull
- The Code
- Crashing (U.S. TV series)
- Daredevil
- The Defenders
- Definitely, Maybe
- The Detour (TV series)
- The Deuce (TV series)
- Difficult People
- Falling Water (TV series)
- FBI (TV series)
- Flight of the Conchords
- The Get Down
- The Good Fight
- The Good Wife
- Happy! (TV series)
- High Fidelity (film)
- How to Make it in America
- I, Robot
- Jessica Jones
- Limitless (TV series)
- Luke Cage
- The Marvelous Mrs. Maisel
- Madam Secretary
- Master of None
- Mr. Robot
- Mrs. Fletcher
- The Naked Brothers Band
- New Amsterdam (2018 TV series)
- New York Undercover
- NYPD Blue (Season 2)
- Ray Donovan
- Rescue Me (U.S. TV series)
- Royal Pains
- Saturday Night Live
- Search Party (TV series)
- She's Gotta Have It (TV series)
- Smash
- Sneaky Pete
- Spider-Man 3
- The Tick (2001 TV series)
- Unbreakable Kimmy Schmidt
- Unforgettable (2017 film)
- Veep
- The Woman in the Window (2019 film)

== Criminal Indictments by Manhattan District Attorney ==
In August 2025, Gina Argento, Anthony "Tony" Argento, and Broadway Stages Ltd. were indicted by the Manhattan District Attorney's office on charges of conspiracy in the fourth degree and bribery in the second degree. The indictment alleges that between March 2022 and November 2024, the Argentos conspired with Ingrid Lewis-Martin, chief advisor to New York City Mayor Eric Adams, to influence the New York City Department of Transportation's plans for redesigning McGuinness Boulevard in Greenpoint, Brooklyn, including the addition of protected bike lanes, which the Argentos believed would negatively impact truck access to their facilities. In exchange, Gina and Tony Argento allegedly provided Lewis-Martin with benefits valued over $5,000, including a $2,500 monetary payment via Zelle, a paid speaking role in the Hulu series Godfather of Harlem filmed at Broadway Stages (for which she received $806.31), catering services worth $10,887.50 for an event at Gracie Mansion, and clothing items from Bloomingdale's. Lewis-Martin was charged with bribe receiving in the second degree in the same indictment. All defendants pleaded not guilty at their arraignment on August 21, 2025.
