= Brooklyn borough presidency of Eric Adams =

Borough president of Brooklyn

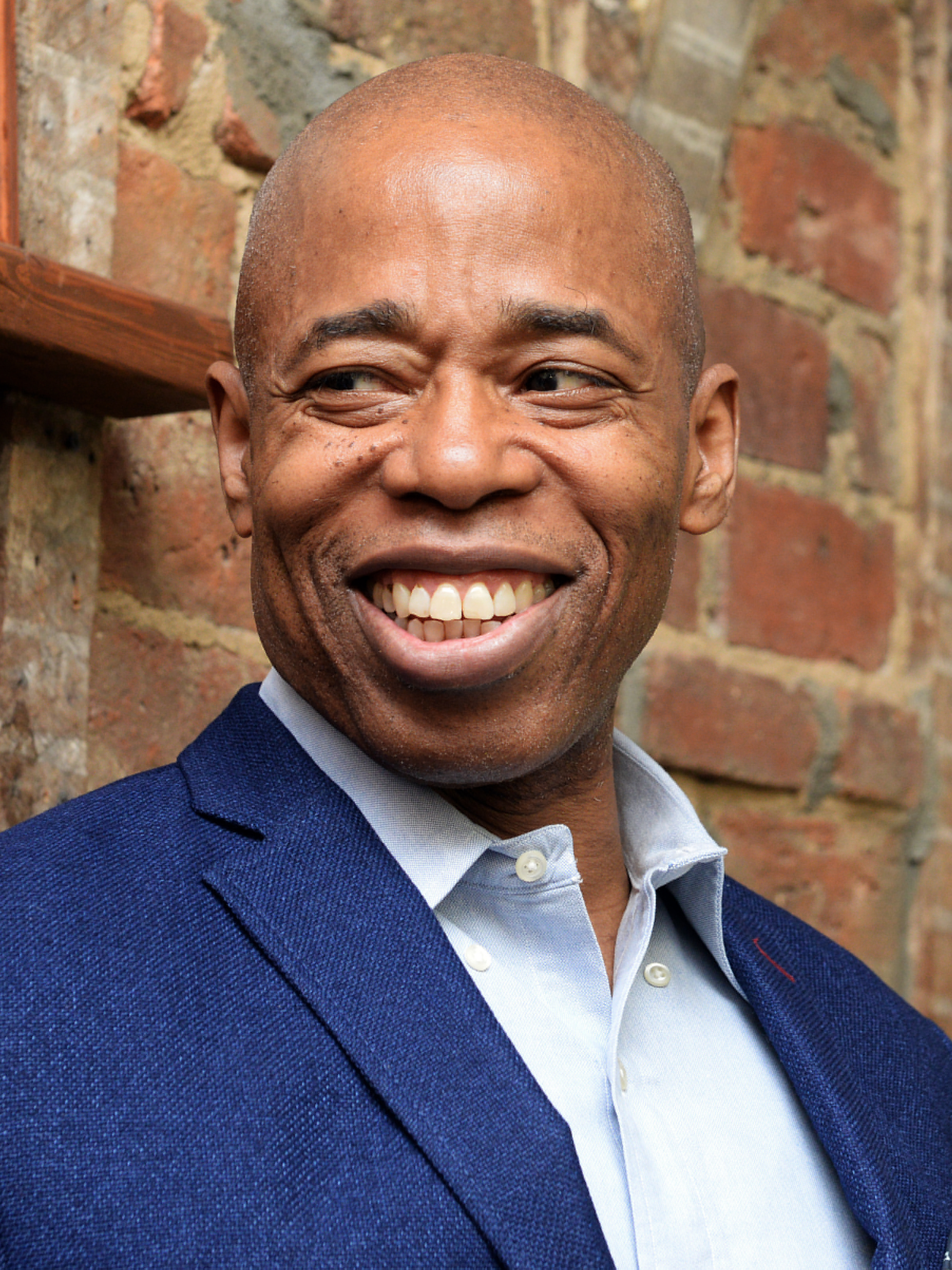
- Borough Presidency of Eric Adams; January 1, 2014 – December 31, 2021
- President: Eric Adams
- Party: Democratic
- Election: 2013; 2017

Eric Adams served as borough president of Brooklyn from January 1, 2014, until December 31, 2021. He was the first African American to hold the office.

== Elections ==
On November 5, 2013, Adams was elected Brooklyn Borough President with 90.8 percent of the vote, more than any other candidate for borough president in New York City that year. In 2017, he was elected with 83.0 percent of the vote. In both of his campaigns, he was unopposed in the Democratic primaries.

== Community boards ==
Adams, in his role as Brooklyn Borough President, appointed the members of each of the 18 community boards in Brooklyn, half of which are nominated by local members of the New York City Council. Community board members represent their neighbors in matters dealing with land use and other specific neighborhood needs.

In 2016, Adams launched a mobile app that could be used as a paperless alternative to applying for a position on one of Brooklyn's community boards. Applications increased by 10 percent.

== Land use ==
Under the New York City Charter, borough presidents must submit Uniform Land Use Review Procedure (ULURP) recommendations on certain uses of land throughout their borough. Adams used his ULURP recommendations to propose additional permanently affordable housing units in the rezoning of East New York; the relocation of municipal government agencies to East New York to reduce density in Downtown Brooklyn and create jobs for community residents; and the redevelopment of 25 Kent Avenue in Williamsburg as manufacturing space, with increased property taxes directed to the acquisition of the remaining proposed sections of Bushwick Inlet Park and their development as a community resource.

Adams encouraged New York City to build affordable housing on municipally owned properties such as the Brownsville Community Justice Center, over railyards and railways, and on space now used for parking lots.

Adams created the Faith-Based Property Development Initiative, which supports religious institutions that want to develop property for the benefit of the community, such as affordable housing and space for community activities.

In September 2017, Adams unveiled his recommendations for the future of the Bedford Union Armory in Crown Heights. His recommendation was to disapprove the application with conditions while calling for the inclusion of a greater amount of affordable housing on-site. The Bedford Union Armory proposals would contain recreational facilities, spaces for local non-profits, and two new residential buildings, including a condominium building along President Street in place of the Armory's stables.

In July 2018, Adams announced a joint $10-million, 19-plaintiff lawsuit with the Housing Rights Initiative (HRI) filed in Kings County Supreme Court. It stemmed from a comprehensive investigation by HRI that found that New York City real estate developer Kushner Companies engaged in illegal construction practices in a 338-unit building (formerly the Austin, Nichols and Company Warehouse), located at 184 Kent Avenue in Williamsburg. According to independent research, families, including children and babies, were exposed to highly toxic and cancer-causing substances, including, but not limited to, the lung carcinogen crystalline silica and lead.

Also in July 2018, Adams urged the developer involved in the Kensington Stables site in Windsor Terrace to help preserve the stables as part of a new proposal for the site.

== Education ==
In partnership with Medgar Evers College, Adams created the Brooklyn Pipeline, which provides developmental learning and enrichment opportunities to public school students in Brooklyn, teaches parents to better support their children's education, and facilitates professional development training to teachers and school leaders.

Adams wrote an editorial in The New York Daily News calling on the New York City Department of Education (DOE) to test all pre-Kindergarten students for gifted and talented programs, including African-American and Latino children who have historically been excluded.

Adams entered Brooklyn into the "Hour of Code" challenge with Chicago Public Schools. This challenge was designed to improve the computer skills of students. Brooklyn students were victorious, with more than 80 percent of the district schools throughout Brooklyn participating in the program.

Based on a report prepared by the Independent Budget Office of New York City (IBO) at his request, Adams urged the City University of New York (CUNY) system to explore reinstating free tuition for two-year community colleges, which could improve graduation rates and lead to increased earnings potential and taxpayer contribution, as well as expand access to higher education.

He advocated for making two-year CUNY colleges free.

Adams supported Orthodox Jewish Yeshivas, which have faced accusations of failing to properly educate students when it comes to secular subjects. On Yeshivas Adams said, "Children have a right to receive the best education, and not all communities, and not all parents take the same approach..." He suggested appointing community ambassadors to serve as intermediaries between Yeshivas and City Hall.

Adams launched a pilot program to provide free space on school campuses to organizations that run after school programs.

== Foreign affairs ==
Adams described himself as "not a domesticated leader, [but] a global leader." Under the title of Borough President, Adams traveled extensively throughout the world including to Senegal, Turkey and Cuba. He created at least five sister city agreements between Brooklyn and cities in other countries that he visited.

As Borough President, Adams traveled to China seven times. He allocated $2 million towards a plan to build a 40-foot friendship archway in the Chinese neighborhood of Sunset Park, Brooklyn, but the Chinese government ended up rescinding gifting the archway and the deal fell through.

A supporter of Israel, Adams had visited Israel multiple times, including leading a 2016 delegation focused on public safety and economic development between the US and Israel. He opposed the Boycott, Divestment and Sanctions (BDS) movement.

== Health ==
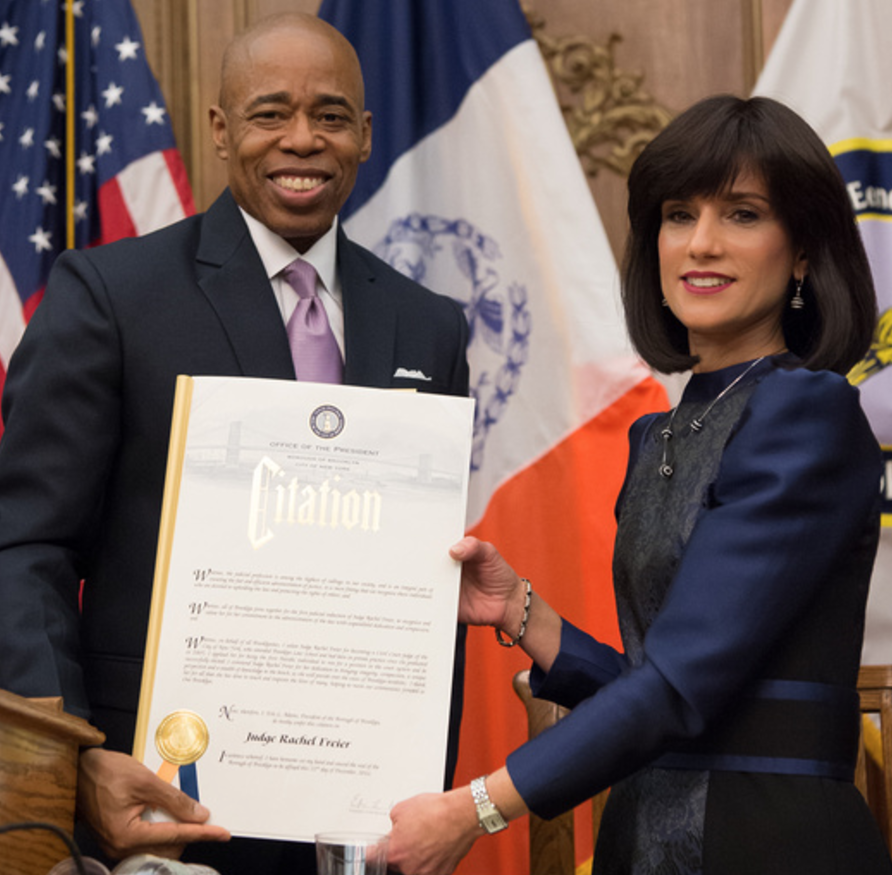
Adams with Judge Rachel Freier in 2016

Adams launched the Family Friendly Brooklyn initiative by creating a lactation room in Brooklyn Borough Hall, with open access to the public. He introduced a bill in the New York City Council that would require all municipal buildings providing services to the public to have lactation rooms. The bill was passed by the City Council on July 14, 2016. In July 2018, Adams publicly denounced President Trump's efforts to stop Ecuador from passing a U.N. resolution stating that breastfeeding is the most beneficial way of feeding a child.

After Adams received a personal diagnosis of type two diabetes in 2016, he adopted a plant-based diet and had since used the office to advocate for Brooklynites to adopt plant-based diets along with encouraging healthier lifestyles. The Office of the Brooklyn Borough President launched a plant-based nutrition page on its website with links to resources encouraging vegan and plant-based lifestyles, as well as printable handouts produced by the borough. Additionally, Adams also prompted the City Council to pass a resolution called "Ban the Baloney", which aims for schools across the city to stop serving processed meats. He also was an avid supporter of "Meatless Mondays" in public schools. In 2021, Adams authorized a grant from the borough to SUNY Downstate College of Medicine to establish a plant-based supplemental curriculum.

After a spike in rat complaints, Adams co-hosted a Rat Summit alongside Council Member Robert Cornegy in June 2018 to address the issue of rats throughout the borough. In September 2019, he promoted new traps that lured rats with nuts and seeds before knocking them out and drowning them. He showed a group of reporters one of the traps that had caught rats around Brooklyn Borough Hall. He presented their corpses in an effort to demonstrate the trap's effectiveness. Adams and his team said the traps were more humane than poison because they did not cause the rats to suffer in pain for an extended period. The group "Voters for Animal Rights wrote an open letter to the borough president questioning the usefulness of these traps to achieve their goal and their purported humaneness.

== Housing ==
To address the displacement of longtime residents by gentrification, Adams held a series of town halls in Bedford–Stuyvesant and East Flatbush to investigate cases of tenant harassment, and also organized legal clinics in East New York, Prospect Lefferts Gardens, and Sunset Park to provide free legal assistance to tenants.

He stood on the damaged roof of 110 Humboldt Street, a seven-story residential building in the Borinquen Plaza II development in Williamsburg, as he called on Governor Andrew Cuomo to restore $100 million in State funding for New York City Housing Authority (NYCHA) roof repairs.

In June 2018, Adams suggested lowering the height of the Alloy Development's Downtown Brooklyn project, 80 Flatbush, from 986 to 600 feet in order to not disrupt or overwhelm the existing community surrounding the building.

=== Gentrification ===
In 2017 when speaking about gentrification, Adams said "Our young people coming in need to understand that they are not the modern-day Christopher Columbus: They did not discover Brooklyn. Brooklyn was here long before they set sail, and if anything they need to be part of the greatness of Brooklyn and add their flavor, but not destroy what we are."

In January 2020, Adams gave a speech at an event in Harlem celebrating Martin Luther King Jr. Day. During the speech, he discussed recent New York City transplants, saying, "Go back to Iowa. You go back to Ohio! New York City belongs to the people that [were] here and made New York City what it is." Earlier in the speech, Adams spoke highly of long-term residents, saying, "You were here before Starbucks. You were here before others came and decided they wanted to be part of this city. Folks are not only hijacking your apartments and displacing your living arrangements, they displace your conversations and say that things that are important to you are no longer important."

A spokeswoman for Mayor Bill de Blasio said, "The mayor doesn't agree with how it was said, but the borough president voiced a very real frustration. We need to improve affordability in this city to ensure New Yorkers can stay in the city they love, but New York City will always be a city for everyone." Adams later clarified that he only took issue with new arrivals who do not engage with longtime residents or their communities.

== Transit ==
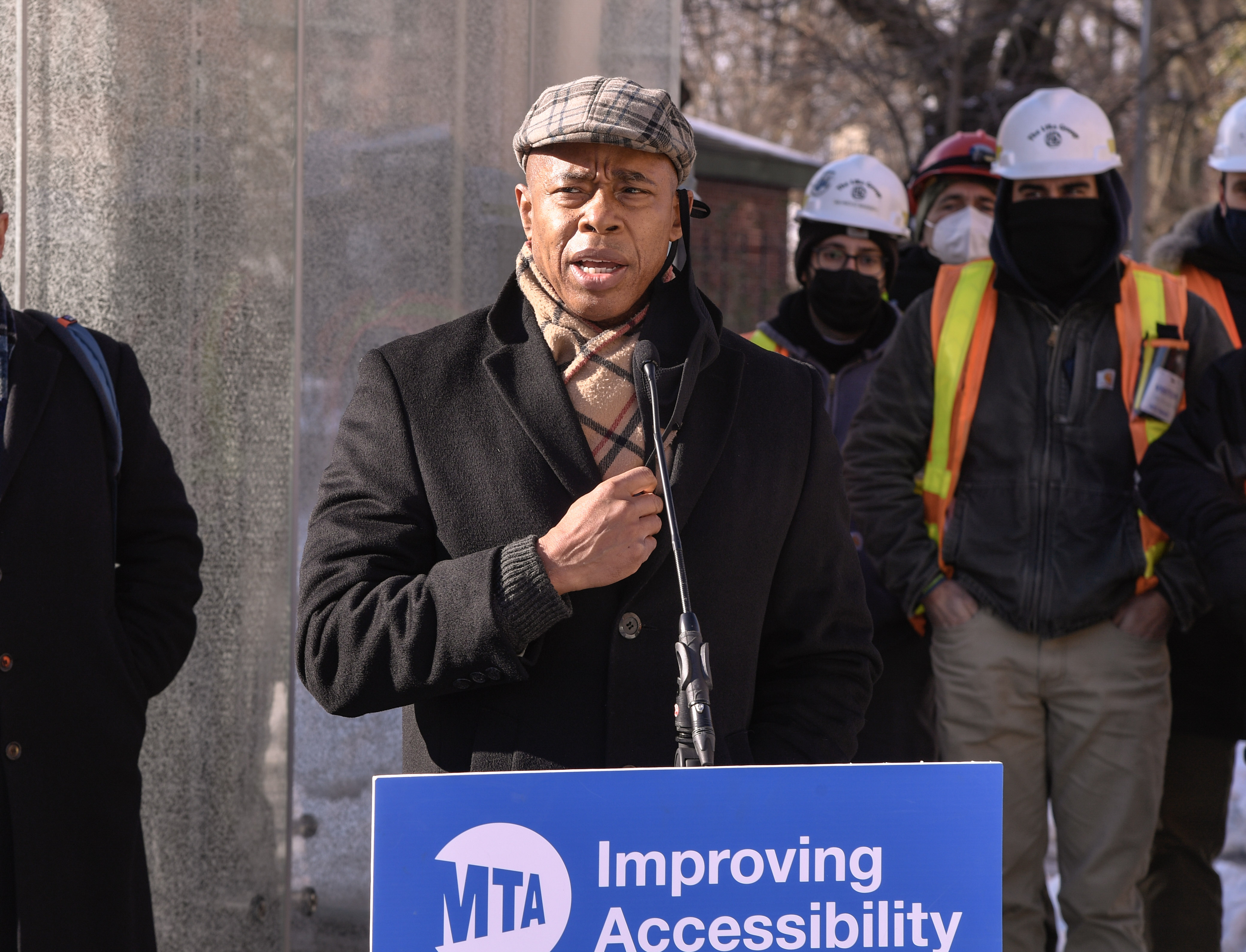
Adams at an Metropolitan Transportation Authority press conference in 2020

Adams, in February 2020, announced that he would create a task force to look into mass transit upgrades to the Utica Avenue corridor.

Adams opposed efforts to limit the number of new e-hail cars, such as Uber, explaining that such transit options provide opportunities for people of color to find work and travel in their communities.

== Public safety ==
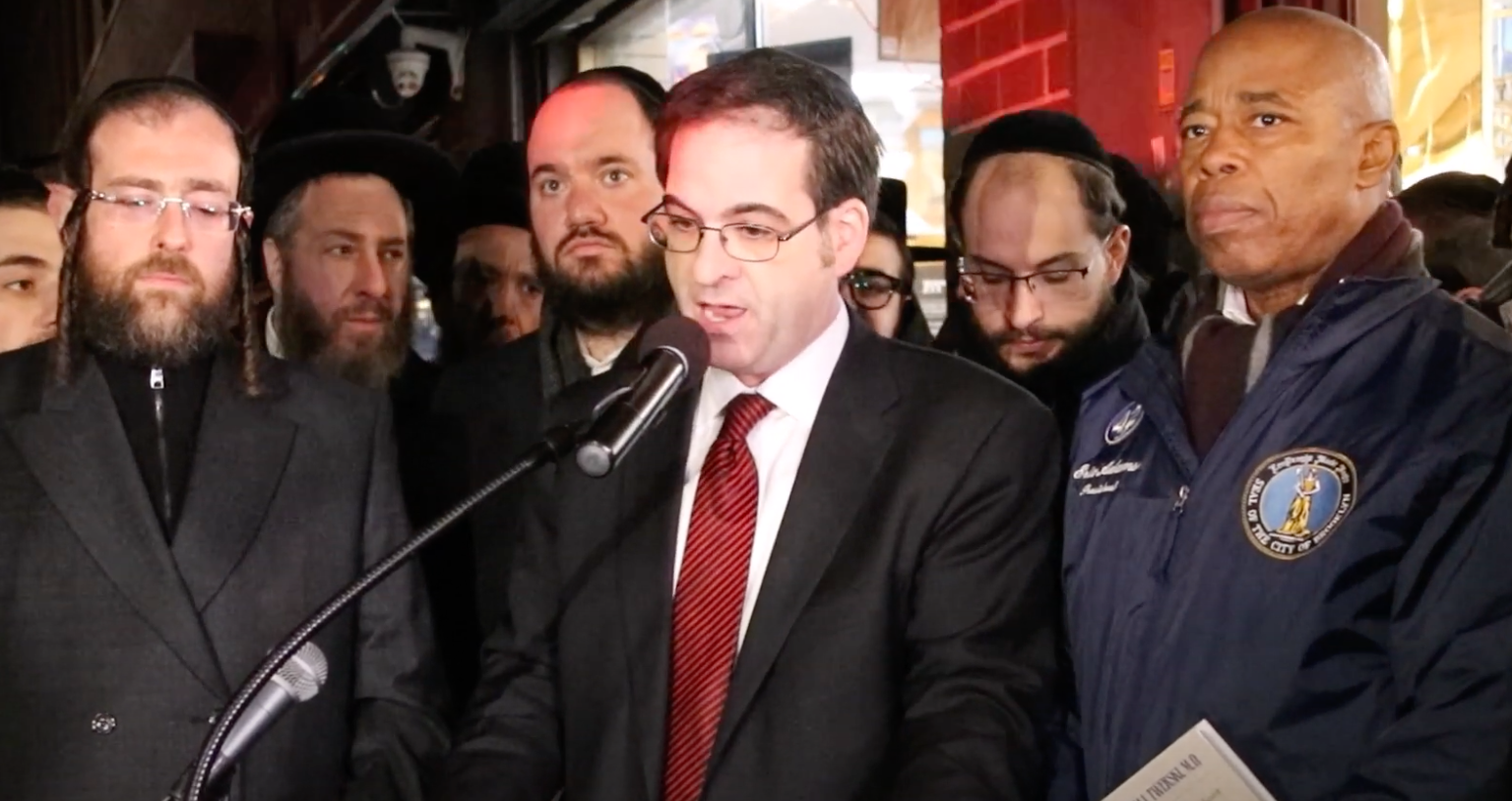
Adams with Councilmember Kalman Yeger and members of the Jewish community after the 2019 Jersey City shooting

Adams criticized the use of excessive force in the arrest of Eric Garner, who died after being placed in a chokehold prohibited by NYPD regulations, and the arrest of postal carrier Glen Grays, who was determined not to have committed any crime or infraction.

After the 2014 killings of NYPD officers Wenjian Liu and Rafael Ramos, he wrote an editorial for the New York Daily News calling on police officers and the community to work with each other to build a relationship of mutual respect.

Together with Manhattan Borough President Gale Brewer and civil rights attorney Norman Siegel, Adams held a series of seven public forums and four Google Hangouts for community residents to share their experiences with the police. The information was used to compile a report, and it was concluded that New York City should work to involve the public in the work of the NYPD, improve training for police officers, and allow independent investigations when police misconduct is alleged.

Following the school shooting at Marjory Stoneman Douglas High School in Parkland, Florida, on February 14, 2018, he joined the efforts of Brooklyn students by organizing an emergency meeting at Brooklyn Borough Hall and a rally in Prospect Park to demand stricter gun laws. That same month, after a correctional officer endured a beating from six inmates at the George Motchan Detention Center on Rikers Island, Adams stood outside the Brooklyn Detention Center to express his support to reinstate solitary confinement in prisons.

== Technology ==
Adams formed a partnership with flowthings.io, a Brooklyn-based startup, and Dell to access and collect real-time data on conditions in Brooklyn Borough Hall, with device counters to monitor occupancy in rooms that sometimes experience overcrowding, multi-sensors to determine whether equipment had been operating efficiently, sensors such as smart-strips and smart-plugs to measure energy usage around the building, and ultrasonic rangefinders to identify that ADA-designated entrances are accessible in real-time.

He partnered with tech startup Heat Seek NYC to allow tenants to be able to report conditions in their apartments with sensor hardware and web applications.

== Parking disputes ==
Adams was criticized during his tenure for allowing his staff to abuse official "parking placards", which permit temporary or emergency lifting of parking restrictions for official government business. Critics said that it blocked access to crosswalks and sidewalks by disabled individuals.

At a September 2019 town hall, Adams responded, saying "The only individuals who are allowed to park private vehicles around the building are my women employees that I have told they have to respond late at night when they call."

== Other initiatives ==
In 2014, Adams established One Brooklyn Fund, a non-profit organization for community programs, grant writing, and extolling local businesses, though it was criticized as serving as a conduit for his public profile and allowing non-campaign pay to play contributions from developers and lobbyists. Adams's office have been investigated twice by the city Department of Investigation (DOI) over One Brooklyn's fundraising. The first investigation was in 2014 over potential attendees being asked if they were interested in providing "financial support" to One Brooklyn. In 2016, Adams's office was found by the DOI to wrongly license the use of Borough Hall to the Mayor's Office for an event.

Given the success of the brewing industry in Brooklyn, Adams called for a more lenient Blue Law since October 2017, allowing New York City businesses to start selling alcohol two hours earlier starting at 8 a.m.
