= Ingrid Lewis-Martin =

American political advisor

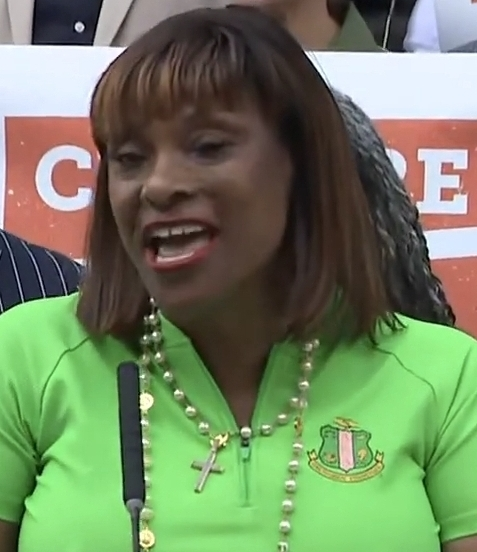

Chief Advisor to the Mayor of New York City
- In office January 10, 2022 – December 15, 2024
- Mayor: Eric Adams
- Preceded by: position established

Deputy Borough President of Brooklyn
- In office September 1, 2019 – December 31, 2021
- Borough President: Eric Adams
- Preceded by: Diana Reyna
- Succeeded by: Diana Richardson

Personal details
- Born: Ingrid P. Lewis; February 28, 1961 (age 65) Brooklyn, New York, U.S.
- Party: Democratic
- Spouse: Glenn D. Martin
- Education: John Jay College of Criminal Justice (BA)

Ingrid P. Lewis-Martin (née Lewis; born February 28, 1961) is an American chaplain and political advisor. She served as chief advisor to the Mayor of New York City, Eric Adams, from January 2022 until December 2024. She referred to herself as "The Lioness of City Hall". Lewis-Martin is a longtime ally of Adams.

== Early life and education ==
Lewis-Martin was born in Brooklyn and raised in the Bed-Stuy and Crown Heights neighborhoods, her father immigrated from Barbados and her mother was born in New York City but grew up in Panama. She graduated from John Jay High School and attended SUNY Old Westbury before transferring to John Jay College, studying criminal justice. She is a member of Alpha Kappa Alpha sorority.

== Career ==
Lewis-Martin previously worked as a public school teacher and as an instructor at Medgar Evers College. She got her start in politics volunteering for U.S. Representative Major Owens, then served as his deputy campaign manager. She would go on to serve as chief of staff in the New York State Senate for Adams.

In June 2025, the New York Daily News reported that Lewis-Martin was playing an active role in Adams' re-election campaign in the 2025 New York City mayoral election.

=== Chief Advisor to the Mayor ===
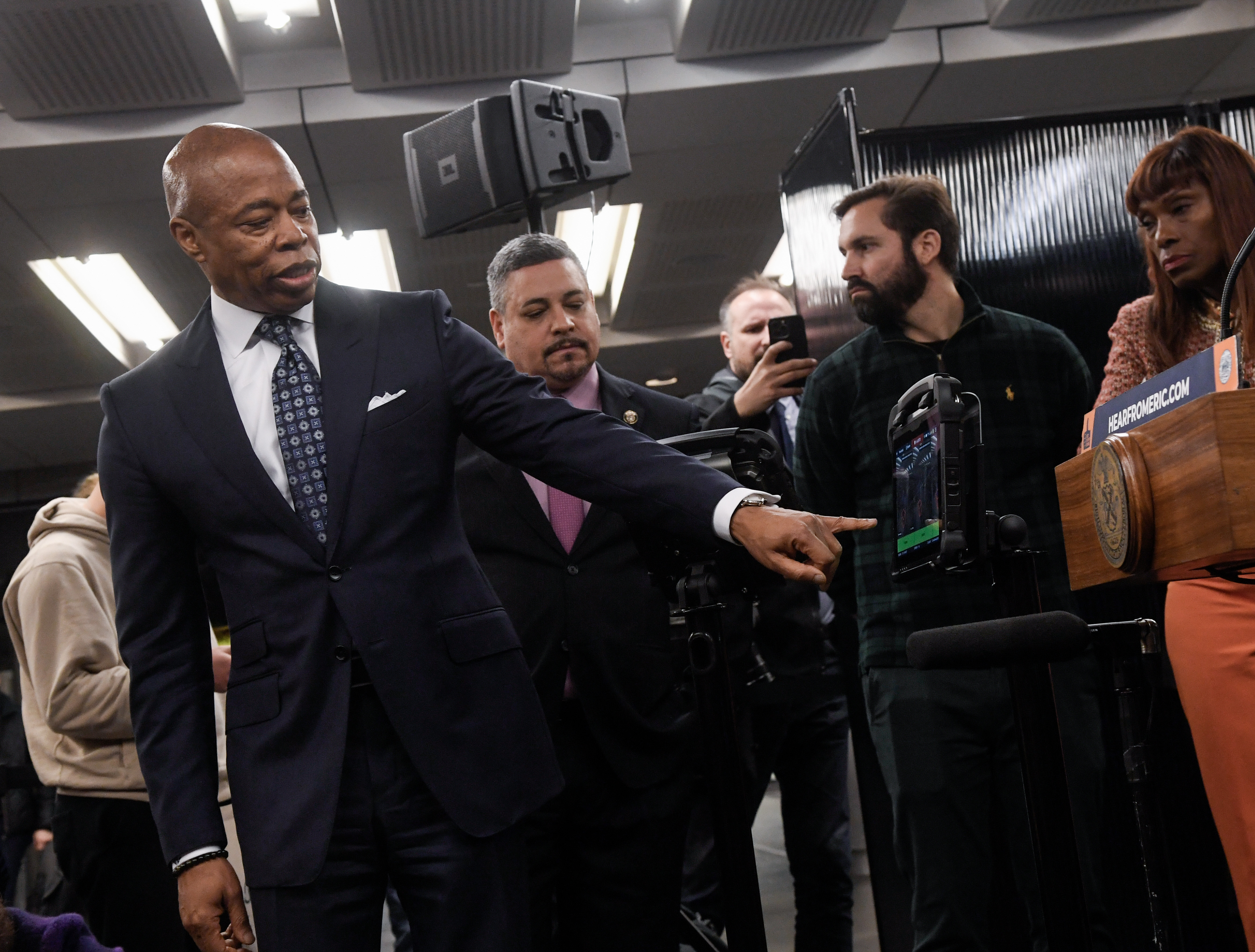
Lewis-Martin (far-right) appears with Mayor Eric Adams (center-left) and Police Commissioner Edward Caban (center background) for the pilot of a weapons detector program on the subway in 2024.

In 2022, Lewis-Martin began to serve as chief advisor to Adams. Her starting salary was more than $250,000.

In 2023, she was charged with a $1,000 fine for abusing her position to financially benefit an aide who owed her money.

Lewis-Martin abruptly resigned from the position on December 15, 2024.

==== Investigations and indictments ====
On September 27, 2024, in the midst of the investigations into the Eric Adams administration, federal investigators searched Lewis-Martin's home, then seized her phones and served her with a grand jury subpoena on arrival at JFK Airport. Lewis-Martin was returning from a vacation in Japan alongside Jesse Hamilton and Adam Clayton Powell IV. A search warrant published by the Manhattan District Attorney's office stated that they were investigating 5 charges, including: bribery, falsifying business records, offering a false instrument for filing, and money laundering.

On December 15, 2024, Lewis-Martin announced her abrupt resignation reportedly due to a forthcoming indictment after prosecutors from the Manhattan District Attorney's office presented evidence of misconduct to a grand jury. Lewis-Martin's lawyer Arthur Aidala said the expected criminal charges related to alleged improper gifts, he characterized the case as politically motivated and she claimed she was being falsely accused.

On December 19, 2024, indictments against Lewis-Martin and her son were announced. She was indicted for a second time on August 21, 2025 on four separate counts.

In January 2026, prosecutors charged Lewis-Martin on some counts of accepting bribes of diamond earrings and more gifts from 2 developers in exchange for eliminating requirements to pass inspections before proceeding to construct the buildings.

In autumn 2026, wiretaps of Lewis-Martin were repeatedly entered into evidence at the trial of fellow Adams administration member Eric Ulrich. The role of Lewis-Martin, the prosecution contended, was to lean on city bureaucracies to do favors for Ulrich's associates after they had bribed him.

== Personal life ==
Lewis-Martin is married to Glenn D. Martin, a police officer who trained with Eric Adams. A Pentecostal, Lewis-Martin is an ordained chaplain. She lives in the East Flatbush neighborhood of Brooklyn. Lewis-Martin is a member of the Order of the Eastern Star.
