= Straw donor =

Illegal political contributor

A straw donor is a person who illegally uses another person's money to make a political contribution in their own name.

== United States ==
In the United States, making a political contribution in another person's name is illegal, as is agreeing to be the named donor with someone else's money. For example, a straw donor may contribute to a political campaign before being reimbursed by another, who is using that person as a conduit to exceed the limits on campaign contributions under the laws of a jurisdiction.

In federal elections in the United States, straw donor schemes are illegal under 52 U.S.C. § 30122, which states:

No person shall make a contribution in the name of another person or knowingly permit his name to be used to effect such a contribution, and no person shall knowingly accept a contribution made by one person in the name of another person.

This section was enacted as part of the Federal Election Campaign Act in 1971.

=== Thornton Law scandal ===
A Massachusetts law firm, Thornton Law, has been accused of funneling funds to the Democrats through a massive and illegal straw-donor scheme. In a 33-page report, lawyers at the Federal Election Commission found "extensive evidence" that Boston's Thornton Law firm likely used a phony program to repay their law firm's partners for political donations, but the case was dismissed after commissioners deadlocked 2-vs-2 on whether to pursue it.

The law firm's partners donated nearly $1.6 million to mostly Democratic candidates and committees between 2010 and 2014. They were reimbursed $1.4 million as "bonuses" ten days later, in many cases receiving bonuses that precisely matched their political donations.

“While our investigation did not find sufficient evidence to support a criminal charge, we are recommending enhancements to current state campaign finance laws to address the ambiguities in the law that gave rise to these allegations”, Essex District Attorney Jonathan Blodgett said.

While the small firm made donations primarily to Democrats, their donations also included some Republicans. Most political campaigns quickly returned any donations upon being informed of the investigation.

=== Dinesh D'Souza ===
In 2014, Dinesh D'Souza a right-wing political commentator, filmmaker, and conspiracy theorist, was charged with and convicted of reimbursing others $20,000 for donations to his friend, the 2012 Senate candidate Wendy Long, a New York Republican. D'Souza was later pardoned by the 45th president Donald Trump on May 31, 2018.

=== Jeffrey E. Thompson ===
In 2016, Jeffrey E. Thompson was sentenced to three months in prison, three years of probation, and a $10,000 fine for the illegal funding through straw donors of several political candidates, including Hillary Clinton in her 2008 presidential bid and Vincent Gray in his 2010 run for mayor of Washington, D.C.
