= Feniosky Peña-Mora =

Dominican engineer and educator (born 1966)

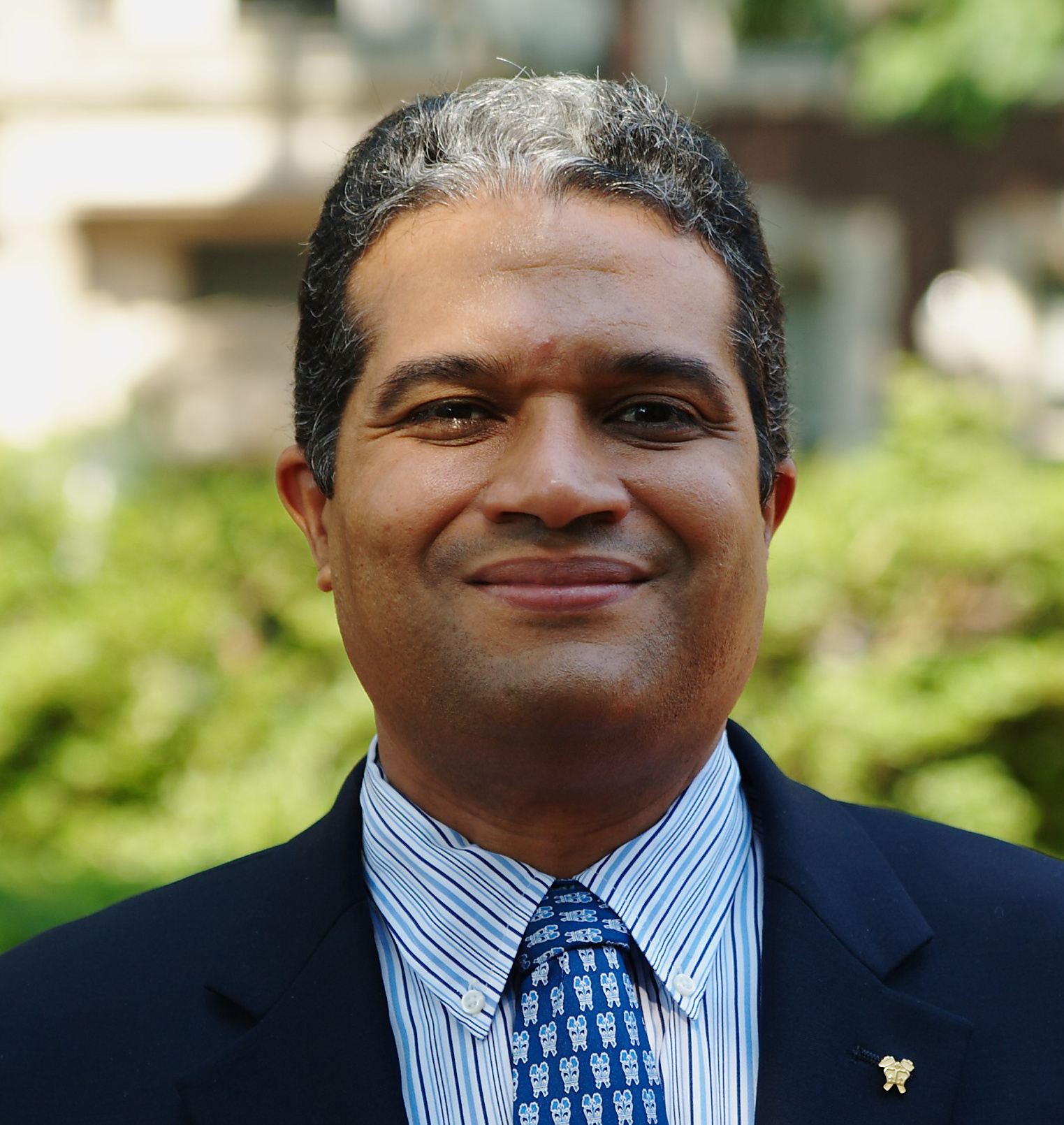

Commissioner of the New York City Department of Design and Construction
- In office April 8, 2014 – June 21, 2017
- Appointed by: Bill de Blasio
- Preceded by: David J. Burney
- Succeeded by: Ana Barrio (interim)

Personal details
- Born: March 6, 1966 (age 60) Dominican Republic
- Spouse: Minosca Alcantara
- Education: Universidad Nacional Pedro Henríquez Ureña (B.S.); Massachusetts Institute of Technology (M.S., Sc.D.)
- Awards: Huber Award (2007)

Feniosky Peña-Mora (born March 6, 1966) is a Dominican-born engineer, educator, and professor. He served as commissioner of the New York City Department of Design and Construction from 2014 to 2017, as dean of Columbia School of Engineering and Applied Science from 2009 to 2012, and as associate provost of the University of Illinois at Urbana–Champaign. He was inducted as president of the American Society of Civil Engineers in October 2024.

== Career ==
Peña-Mora is the Edwin Howard Armstrong Professor of Civil Engineering and Engineering Mechanics at Columbia University. Previously, he was the Dean of the Columbia School of Engineering and Applied Science.

Peña-Mora’s tenure as dean was marked by faculty criticism and internal conflict. Several faculty members and department chairmen passed a "no-confidence" vote regarding his leadership. They criticized his management style and the rapid expansion of the engineering school, claiming it overloaded professors with too many students. They also asserted that he prioritized fundraising over research and did not honor his promises. One of Peña-Mora's most vocal critics, Van C. Mow, called him a "control freak", and stepped down as Chair of the Department of Biomedical Engineering in 2011. Peña-Mora resigned in July 2012.

Peña-Mora continued supervising PhD and graduate research students, and was listed as being on "public service leave" while serving at the DDC. He maintained a named professorship with a salary of more than $500,000 in 2015, in addition to his salary as Commissioner.

In July 2023, Peña-Mora became the Dean of the School of Engineering and Sciences at Tec de Monterrey.

=== Public service ===
Peña-Mora was previously the Commissioner of the New York City Department of Design and Construction. Controversy followed Peña-Mora in 2016, when a supposed quid-pro-quo scheme was uncovered. Peña-Mora allegedly directed DDC funds and City contracts to Renee Sacks, as well as organizations she worked with, while Sacks' firm, Sacks Communications, made its entire Spring 2016 issue of Diversity/Agenda magazine about Peña-Mora.

On June 21, 2017, Peña-Mora announced his plans to depart the DDC. News reports attributed his departure to "Hurricane Sandy rebuilding failures."

== Patents ==
- Hussein, K. and Peña-Mora, F., “Collaborative Agent Interaction Control and Synchronization System,” MIT Case No. 8376S, Daly, Crowley & Mofford, LLP file MIT-057AUS, US Patent Application No. 09/540,947, Issued February 28, 2006.
- Peña-Mora, F. and Kuang, C., “Mechanisms and Artifacts to Manage Heterogeneous Platform Interfaces in a Collaboration,” MIT Case No. 9249S Daly, Crowley & Mofford, LLP file MIT-057BUS, US Patent Application No. 10/069,885, Issued January 9, 2007.
- Peña-Mora, F., Vadhavkar, S., Dwivedi, G., Kuang, C., and Wang, W., “Software Service Handoff Mechanism with A Performance Reliability Improvement Mechanism (PRIM) for a Collaborative Client-Server System,” MIT Case No. 9250S, Daly, Crowley & Mofford, LLP file MIT-092AUS, US Patent Application No. 10/069,797, Issued May 15, 2007.
- Peña-Mora, F., Park, M., Lee, S., Fulenwider, M., and Li, M. “Dynamic Planning Method and System,” MIT Case No. 9185S, Daly, Crowley & Mofford, LLP file MIT-086AUS, US Patent Application No. 10/068,119, US Patent No. 7,349,863, Issued March 25, 2008.
- Peña-Mora, F., Park, M., Lee, S., Fulenwider, M., and Li, M. “Reliability Buffering Technique Applied to a Project Planning Model,” MIT Case No. 9186S, Daly, Crowley & Mofford, LLP file MIT-087PUSP, US Patent No. 7,415,393, Issued August 19, 2008.
- Golparvar-Fard M., Peña-Mora, F., and Savarese, S. (2010). “D4AR- 4 Dimensional Augmented Reality Models for Automation and Visualization of Construction Progress Monitoring.” United States Provisional Patent Application No. 61/570,491, filed December 14, 2011.
- Thomas J., Peña-Mora, F., and Golparvar-Fard, M. (2009). “Mobile Workstation Chariot.” Provisional Patent, U.S. Patent and Trademark Office (Docket Number: TF08208-PRO).

Government offices
Preceded by David J. Burney	Commissioner of the New York City Department of Design and Construction; 2014–2017	Succeeded by Ana Barrio (interim)
