= Bermuda shorts =

Knee-length walking shorts

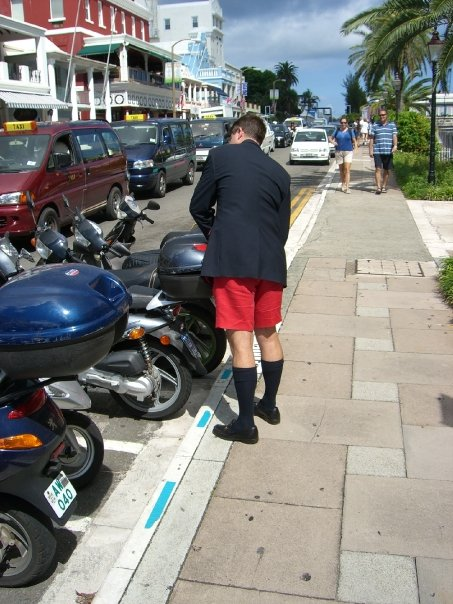
A modern-day businessman in Hamilton, Bermuda wearing formal business attire including Bermuda shorts

Bermuda shorts, also known as walk shorts or dress shorts, are a particular type of short trousers, worn as semi-casual attire by both men and women. The hem, which can be cuffed or un-cuffed, is around 1 inch (2.5 cm) above the knee.

They are so-named because of their popularity in Bermuda, a British Overseas Territory, where they are considered appropriate business attire for men when made of suit-like material and worn with knee-length socks, a dress shirt, tie, and blazer.

True Bermuda shorts are not to be confused with "capri pants" extending below the knee. Cargo shorts may be a similar length but are typically baggy or less "tailored" than Bermuda shorts and more typical of West Coast American fashion.

== History ==
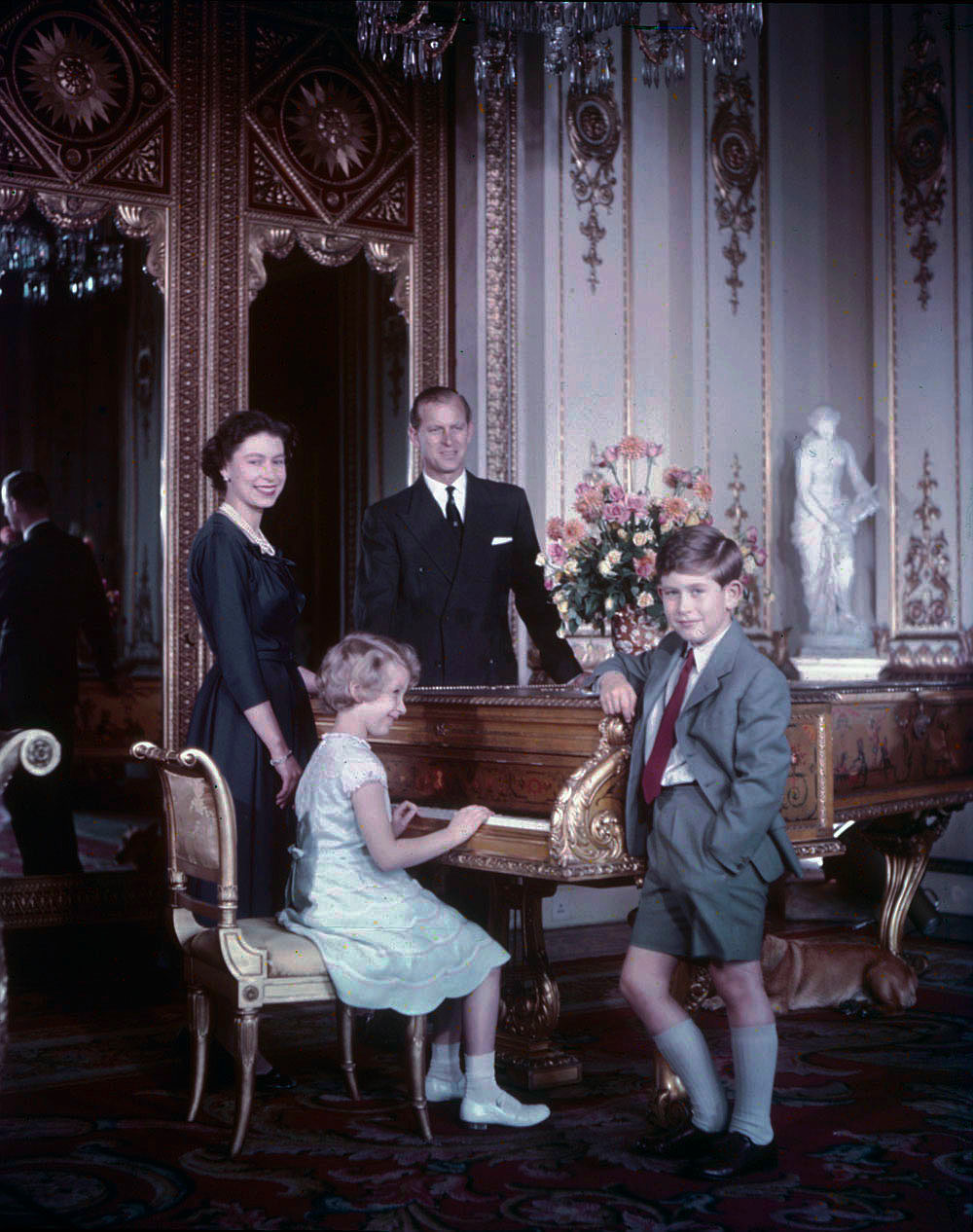
Queen Elizabeth II, Prince Philip, Princess Anne, and Bermuda shorts-clad Prince Charles in 1957.

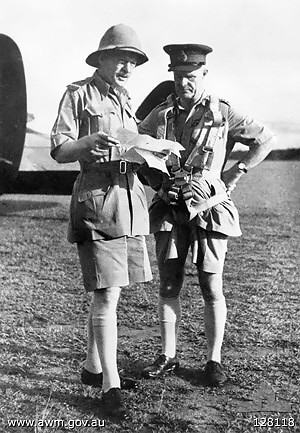
British military commanders Brooke-Popham and Wavell in World War II

The invention of Bermuda shorts is attributed to native Bermudian and tea shop owner Nathaniel Coxon, who in 1914 hemmed the uniform pants of his employees, allowing for more comfort in summer heat. The British Army, stationed in Bermuda during World War I, adopted the shorts for wear in tropical and desert climates.

Bermuda shorts became a popular sportswear item in the 1920s and 1930s for their association with leisure and tropical vacations. Their name was likely codified in the United States by The Bermuda Shop, a New York City sportswear retailer.

According to Jack Lightbourn, former Executive Vice President of the Bank of Bermuda, the general managers of the two banks in Bermuda, The Bank of Bermuda Ltd and The Bank of N.T. Butterfield and Sons Ltd were concerned that their male employees would not have suitable clothing to wear due to clothing shortages related to World War II. They arranged for a local tailor to make two pairs of shorts, modeled on the shorts of the British military, for each of their male employees. The shorts were made from a very itchy grey flannel material, and each employee was supplied with two pairs of heavy grey wool long socks to wear with the shorts. This was the beginning of Bermuda shorts as business attire in Bermuda as well as the pairing of long socks with Bermuda shorts. In the post-war period local merchants such as Trimingham Bros. and H.A. & E. Smiths improved the design of the shorts and used bright coloured materials as the shorts became more popular.

Vogue first used the term "Bermuda shorts" in 1948. The rise in the popularity of the shorts coincides with the broader rise in the acceptability of shorts as daily wear. Along with jeans, Bermuda shorts were prohibited for female students at Penn State University until 1954, when the ban was lifted only for off-campus events. A piece from that year in The New Yorker mentions that although sales figures for the shorts at retailers such as Brooks Brothers were increasing, certain hotels and clubs still would not allow them.

Bermuda shorts experienced renewed popularity in the 1970s due to increased interest in the fashion of the 1950s. They reappeared on the runways for several years starting in the early 1990s.

== Uses ==
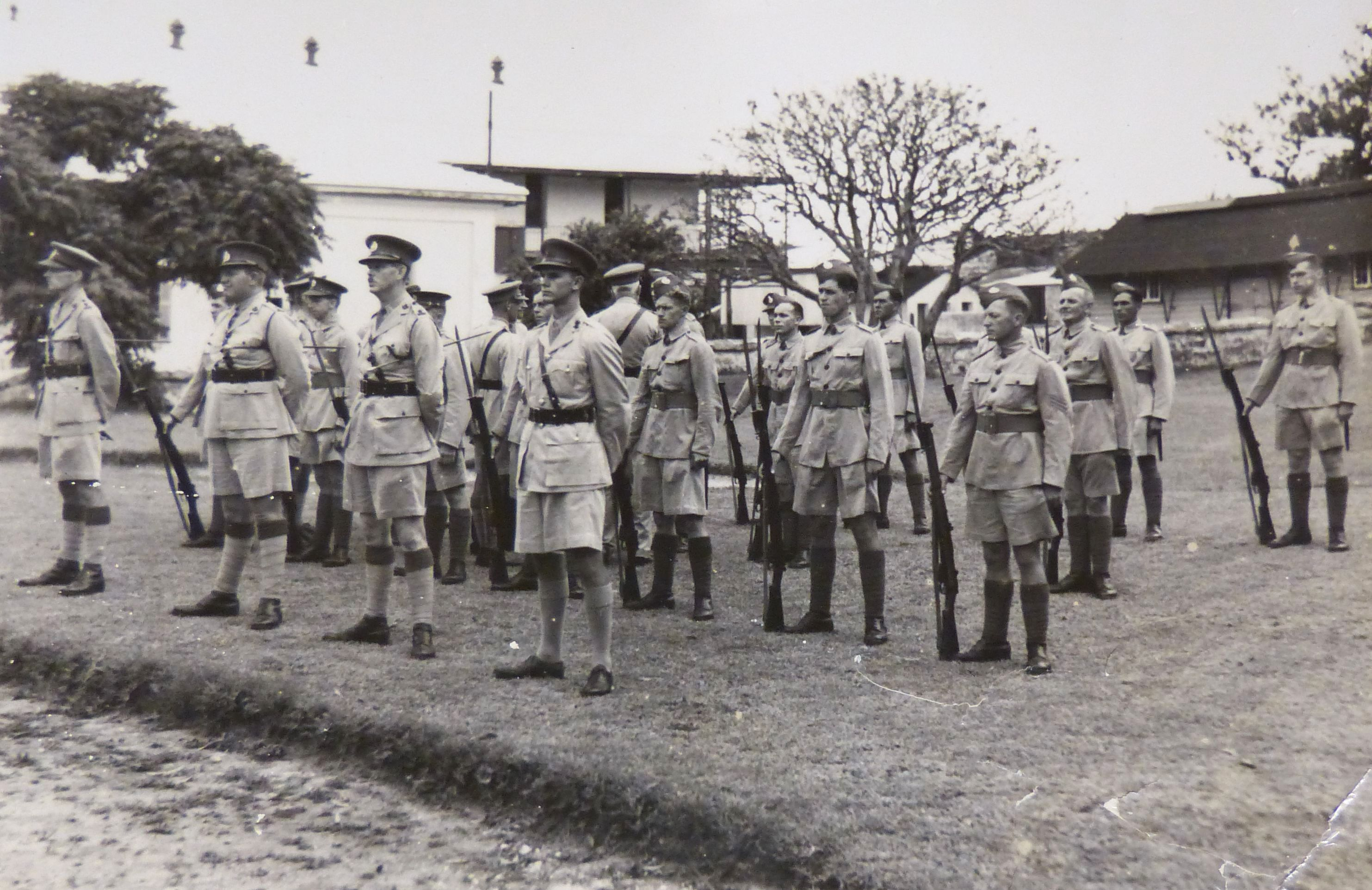
22 June 1940 Prospect Camp inspection by Lieutenant-General Sir Denis Bernard of 1st Bermuda Volunteer Rifle Corps Contingent to the Lincolnshire Regiment showing officers and Other Ranks wearing shorts

Bermuda shorts are considered more appropriate in hot subtropical and tropical climates than the typical heavier clothing favored in Europe. Many businesses in the West today that have a business casual policy similarly allow this kind of clothing in the hotter seasons, especially in the United States, Canada, Australia, and New Zealand.

Bermuda shorts are also part of the boys' summer uniforms of many private schools in the United Kingdom, Australia and New Zealand.

Bermuda shorts are part of the attire for the Royal Canadian Navy. It was formerly part of the uniform of the Royal Ceylon Navy.

During the opening ceremonies of the Olympics and Paralympics, Bermuda's delegation traditionally wears red Bermuda shorts (red being the primary color in the territory's flag).

== See also ==
- Khaki drill – Type of fabric and the military uniforms made of it
- Knee highs – Type of hosiery
- Madras shorts or pants
- Parachute pants – 1980s nylon trousers
- Shorts
- Swim trunks
- The Official Preppy Handbook
- Walk shorts
