= Setton =

Setton may refer to:

- Amanda Setton (born 1985), American actress
- Ishai Setton (born circa. 1975), American film and television director, editor and producer
- Kenneth Setton (1914–1995), American historian
- Lori Ann Setton (born 1962), American biomechanical engineer
- Maxwell Setton (born 1909), British film producer
