= Mao Bangchu =

- 毛邦初
- Mao Bangchu in 1943

Personal details
- Born: 5 March 1904 Shanghai, China
- Died: 22 June 1987 (aged 83) Los Angeles, California, U.S.
- Spouse(s): Wong Ay Chua; Agnes Kelly (1951–1956)
- Awards: Medal of the Kuomintang (1944) Legion of Merit (1945)

Military service
- Allegiance: Republic of China
- Branch/service: Republic of China Air Force
- Years of service: 1927–1952
- Rank: Major General (1940–1949) Lieutenant General (1949–1952)
- Commands: Republic of China Air Force
- Battles/wars: Second Sino Japanese War; World War II; Burma Campaign; China-Burma-India Theater

Mao Bangchu or Mow Pang Tzu (Chinese: 毛邦初; also transcribed as Mow Pang Tsu, Mow Pong Tsu, or Mow Pang Chu; 5 March 1904 – 22 June 1987) was a high-ranking military officer in the Chinese Chiang Kai-shek government. He was the main figure in an embezzlement scandal that pitched him against the Taiwan government in the early fifties. The charges and countercharges of fraud and misappropriation of millions of dollars, ensuing legal battles, and John-le-Carré-like plots involving private detectives, Mexican prisons, night-club dancers, US Congressmen, suspicious deaths, and the US Supreme Court, were covered in over 2,000 articles published in the US, China, Australia, India, and many other countries around the world.

== Early life ==
Mao Bangchu was born in Shanghai, China, in 1904. His ancestral hometown is Fenghua, Ningbo, Zhejiang Province. His mother was the older sister of Mao Fumei, the first wife of Chiang Kai-shek, and mother of Chiang Ching-kuo. Chiang Kai-shek, the leader of the Republic of China between 1928 and 1975, was born in 1887 in Xikou, a town approximately 30 kilometers (19 mi) southwest of downtown Ningbo. Mow Pang Tzu's father worked for Standard Oil in Shanghai.

== Military career ==
Mao graduated from the 3rd class of China's Whampoa Military Academy in 1927. The academy was established in 1924 by the Kuomintang (KMT) with funds and support from the Soviet Union. Soviet officers initially focused their teaching on basic infantry topics and provided special classes for artillery, engineering, communication, logistical and machine gun units. After this basic training, Mao was sent to Moscow and Italy where he received additional flying training. When he returned to China, he became Chiang Kai-shek's personal pilot and distinguished himself during the Northern Expedition that substantially increased Chiang's and the KMT's sphere of influence. During the Northern Expedition, Chiang and his followers, including Mao, decided to purge the KMT of its communist wing. The Shanghai Massacre of 12 April 1927, during which KMT's left wing members, students and worker union members were purged, heralding the beginning of the Chinese Civil War.

Further enhancing his standing with Chiang Kai-shek, Mao commanded the air assaults on a rebellious, heavily-fortified city in the Fujian Province, in 1934. The successful assault proved crucial for Chiang's ground forces to take control of the city. Subsequently, as member of the National Government Aviation Committee, Mao was sent to the United States to explore the purchase of new airplanes for the Chinese air force. While he attend an airshow in Miami, Florida, he met Captain Claire Chennault, who let a demonstration by the Army Air Corps. Impressed by his skills, Mao invited him to come to China. On 25 May 1940, Mao was promoted to major general, and in 1941 he helped Captain Chennault to established the 1st American Volunteer Group (AVG) of the Chinese Air Force. Under the leadership of Chennault the AVG successfully engaged the Imperial Japanese Army Air Force on many occasions, becoming the famous so-called "Flying Tigers". The Flying Tigers were primarily tasked in the defense of the airlift-route over "The Hump" - the lifeline for wartime supplies into China following the cessation of the Sino-Soviet supply line due to the prioritization of war in Europe and the blockade of the Chinese coastline and southern borders. Mao was part of a group of aviators that sought suitable routes over the extremely difficult terrain of the Himalayas, commissioning Charles L. Sharp for the first-ever recorded flight between Dinjan, Burma, and Kunming, China, in what will eventually become known as The Hump heavy-airlift supply line in November 1941.

== Air Force Procurement Officer ==
In 1942 Mao was assigned to the U.S. to establish the Chinese Air Force Office in Washington, DC and was placed in charge of aviation procurement activities. Over the years he was entrusted with over $50,000,000 (worth about half a billion dollars in 2015) for the purchase of military aircraft and supplies. On 14 August 1944, Mao was given the Medal of the Kuomintang, and in August 1945, President Harry Truman awarded him the U.S. Legion of Merit "for exceptionally meritorious conduct in the performance of outstanding services to the Government of the United States from February 1943 to August 1945." Subsequently, he was promoted to lieutenant general of the Republic of China Air Force. In May 1945, Mao was appointed as a member of the Sixth Kuomintang Central Executive Committee. He eventually became the national government's representatives in the United States Aviation Committee and the United Nations Security Council. In 1949 his wife, Wong Ay Chuan (also known as Pauline), and five of his six sons (Van, Maurice, Donald, Harry and William) joined General Mao in Washington, DC, where they lived in a diplomat residence on 32nd Street, N.W. in the Woodley Park neighborhood. His oldest son, David, who served in the Chinese air force, stayed in Taiwan.

== Scandal ==
In the early fifties, Mao became entangled in an embezzlement scandal that was covered in great detail in major US and Chinese newspapers. The Chiang Kai-shek government of the Republic of China alleged that Mao failed to account for $19,440,000 (equivalent to about $180,000,000 in 2015) and removed him from all official positions at the UN. General Mow responded that the charges were only brought in retaliation for his discovery of corruption in the inner circles of the Chiang government. Ambassador Wellington Koo recalled in his memoirs that at the heart of the matter were strong personal animosities between General Chou, who was leading the Chinese Air Force, and General Mao, who "always felt that he should have been the commanding general of the air force." (Madame Chiang Kai-shek had accused both generals as early as 1938 of corruption and was dismayed they had not been punished more severely. Similarly, in 1943, American General Joseph Stilwell, a military adviser to Chiang during World War II, strongly criticized Chiang and his generals for what he perceived as their incompetence and corruption.) Koo furthermore found proof that Mao had diverted large sums of government funds into his own accounts in the US and around the world, which include $2,000,000 in United States Treasury bearer bonds. Fearing extradition to Taiwan and possibly execution, General Mow did not appear in court as ordered, and instead fled to Mexico in January 1952. Initially he flew to San Antonio, TX with his assistant Frances Yuan, who later detailed the journey in a congressional hearing. Subsequently, he flew to Tucson, AZ, took a bus to the border town of Nogales, AZ, and eventually arrived in the resort town of Cuernavaca, approximately 50 miles to the south of Mexico City. The first weeks he stayed with Oliver Kisich, a friend and nightclub entertainer from San Francisco. Mao went on to buy 250,000-Peso villa, hired 4 servants, and arranged for his secretary, Agnes Kelly, a "tall, blonde, ex-showgirl," to join him. When he attempted to obtain a Mexican passport under the cover name of Carlos Gomez Lee Wong, his identity was discovered, and Mexican authorities arrested him for illegal entry into their country.

Mow Pang Tzu defending himself in Mexican Court.

A protracted legal and political battle ensued during which Taiwan sought an extradition of General Mow from Mexico, and the recovery of $6,400,000 million in US courts. General Mow never disputed that he embezzled the funds. He claimed to be a "patriot, preserving all the millions for the people (of China), when they should cast off their present government." Richard O'Connor from the Coronet Magazine commented, "Meanwhile, he spread plenty of their money around as a highly unofficial ambassador of good will." It was reported that the Chiang Kai-shek government hired John Broady, an infamous private investigator, to find and recover the missing funds, and to extract General Mow from Mexico. The attempt of removing Mow from Mexico failed, and an attempt to bring some of the recovered security notes to New York ended with the shooting death of Clarence Sopman, a Broady associate, near Mexico City. In the end, General Mow was imprisoned in the Black Palace of Lecumberri, in a prison cell next to Leon Trotsky assassin Ramón Mercader, from 1951 until 1955. Allegedly he paid $350 per month to have "luxury" prison housing, including a valet, cook, and weekly conjugal visits by Agnes Kelly.

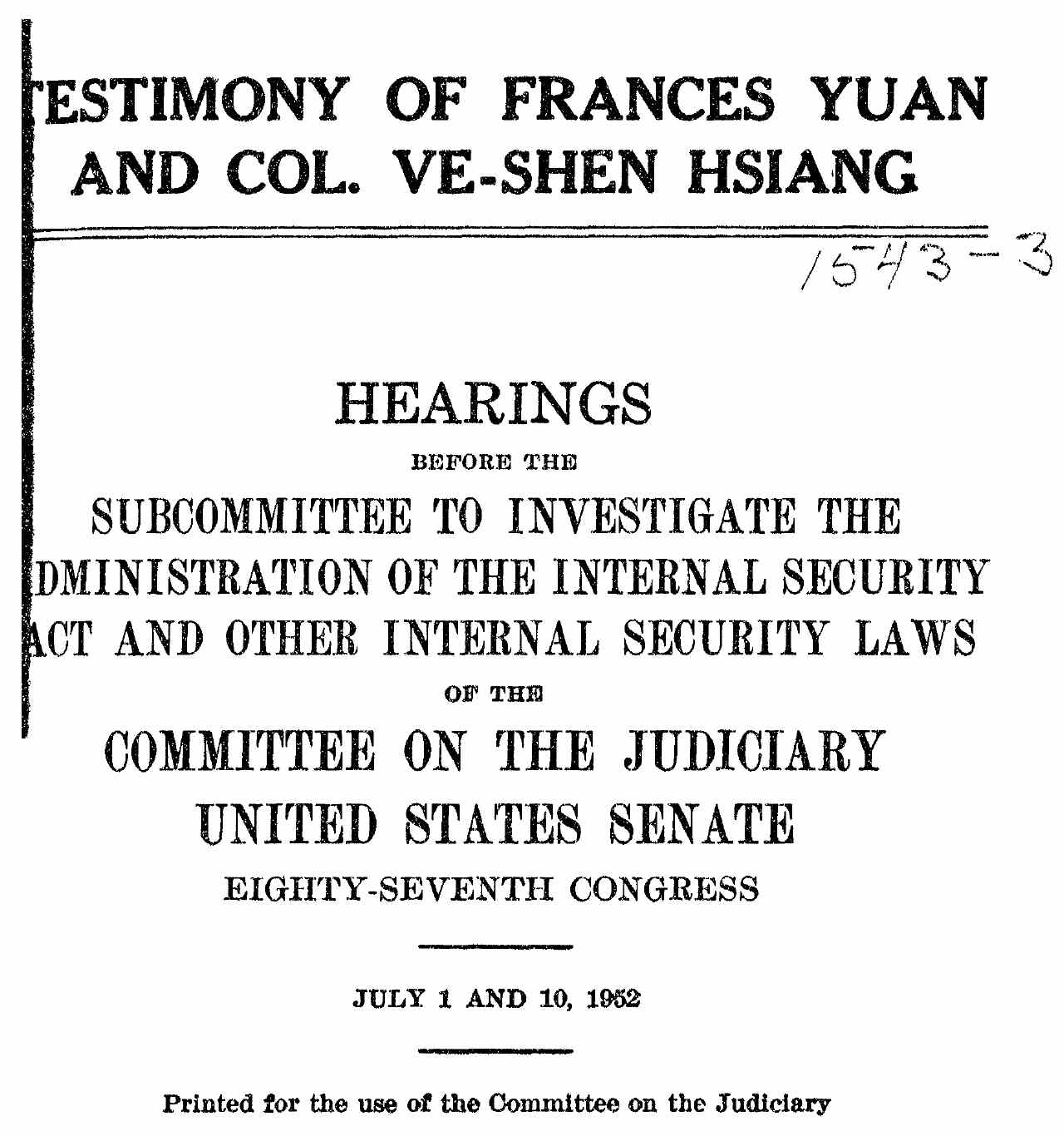
Cover of Transcript of Congressional Hearing HRG-1952-SJS-0024 concerning the General Mow case.

The Mow case also became a proxy battle in the political fight over US support for Communist China under Mao Zedong or National China under Chiang Kai-shek. In the late forties opinions in the US were split about who should be considered the true representative of the Chinese people, the communist government on the mainland, or the government in Taiwan (which was referred to as "Formosa" at that time). Many considered the Formosa government inapt and deeply corrupt; and Mao Zedong, even though a communist, was considered a powerful ally against Japan and Russia. The Korean War, which started in June 1950, seemed to settle the question in favor of Chiang Kai-shek. Consequently, Republicans, such Congressman Walter H. Judd and Senator William F. Knowland strongly supported Taiwan's position. On the other hand, liberal democrats used the case to label Mow as "principled hero" and attacked the Chiang Kai-shek government. A congressional hearing was convened during which France Yuan, Mow personal assistant, and Col. Hsiang, Mow's right hand, were called to testify. Hsiang defended General Mow forcefully, but was not helped by the fact that his wife and children had fled to Communist China. In the press the liberal Drew Pearson from the Washington Post wrote many articles to defend General Mow, while the conservative columnist James Westbrook Pegler tried to discredit Pearson, by linking him to the embezzlement scandal. Apparently Pearson had indirectly received $60,000 from funds misappropriated by Mow.

Mow leaving the Black-Palace prison in Mexico City, 24 May 1955.

In 1955 a Mexican Court barred the extradition of General Mow, and he was freed from prison. However, a US Appeals Court upheld a lower-court ruling that General Mow owed the Republic of China $6,368,503 plus interest and costs. Trying to collect all the funds proved to be difficult, even though a good amount was recovered. For example, $810,000 were seized by court order in Los Angeles. Two $100,000 treasury bonds turned up in Chicago, and a $1,000,000 treasury bill was recovered when a Beverly Hills business man tried to cash it in California. A settlement between the Republic of China and Mow was reached in 1958. The settlement negotiated by ambassador George Yeh called for the return of about $1.5 million in Treasury notes still held in Swiss bank accounts. In exchange, General Mow was cleared of all charges and was allowed to keep $200,000 (equivalent to about $1,700,000 in 2015) for future living expenses. For the next 10 years he lived in Mexico, where he allegedly fathered 2 more children. In the mid-sixties General Mow returned to the US and settled in Los Angeles. His sons Harry C.C. Mow and William C. W. Mow, President and CEO of the famous apparel brand Bugle Boy, supported him until his death in 1987. A detailed account of the scandal, up to the settlement in 1958, was aired on Chinese TV on 15 May 2015.

Certain aspect of the case are still of legal relevance today. For example, General Mow defended his position by claiming that Chiang Kai-shek was not the rightful president of Taiwan and hence could not have ordered him to come back or file a lawsuit on behalf of the Chinese people in US courts. The Supreme Court ruled that it is within the purview of the US President, represented by the State Department, to approve ambassadors and recognizes foreign governments. At that time the State Department had provided a letter to the court stating that Chiang-Kai-Check is the recognized president of Taiwan, and Wellington Koo the recognized ambassador of Taiwan in the US. The Supreme Court recently affirmed this general position, when it struck down a law enacted by Congress, but opposed by President Obama, that would let American citizens born in Jerusalem have Israel listed in passports as their country of birth. Justice Anthony Kennedy wrote in his majority opinion, citing among other sources to the ruling in the Mow case, that recognizing foreign governments is "the President's exclusive power." Another more complex issue arose over the legality of countersuits against a foreign government that has immunity, but brings a suit in an American court. For example, in this case, General Mow had countersued Chiang Kai-shek for defamation and the National City Bank of America, sued by the Republic of China for not releasing funds deposited by General Mow, countersute the Republic of China for recovery of lost funds. The courts held that such countersuites are only narrowly allowed if they directly impact the matter put forward by the suing foreign government. Many of the rulings in this case have been cited in subsequent cases and are frequently discussed in modern law textbooks.

== Family ==
Mao had a younger brother, Mao Yingchu (Chinese: 毛瀛初), who was born in 1911. He had a similar military career as his older brother, becoming a pilot in the Nationalist Air Force of China and rising to the position of commanding officer of the 23rd Pursuit Squadron of 4th Pursuit Group of the Chinese Air Force by 1937. He saw combat at the Battle of Shanghai, Nanking, Wuhan, Xuzhou during the Second Sino-Japanese War, becoming an ace-fighter pilot. In June 1938, he married Zheng Xiuzhen, which whom he would later have two sons and two daughters. Later in the war, he served as an attaché at the Chinese embassy in Washington DC, United States. In 1946, he graduated from the US Staff and Command College at Fort Leavenworth, Kansas, United States. He retired from Republic of China Air Force service in 1968 at the rank of lieutenant general. Between 1969 and 1981, he was an official at the Civil Aviation Authority, and subsequently became the Chairman of the Board of the Hawley & Hazel Chemical Company. He died in Taipei, Taiwan, in 2000.

Mow Pang Tsu was married to Pauline Mow. They had six sons. When the war with Japan broke out in 1937, the family moved to Chongqing, which had become Chiang Kai-shek's provisional capital. As a general's family they "lived lavishly, in a large house guarded by a squad of soldiers." By the end of the war with Japan, in 1945, the family was living in Chengdu from where they undertook a long boat journey down the Yangtze River to Shanghai in 1946. At that time, the city was still held by Chiang's forces, but Communist troops were starting to encircle the city. By 1948, Pauline and her 6 sons were evacuated from mainland China to Taiwan, together with some 2 million people, consisting mainly of members of the ruling Kuomintang, intellectual and business elites, and soldiers. In March 1949, the family briefly returned to Shanghai to board the last Pan Am flight to the U.S. before the city fell to the Communists. (The oldest son, David, was a pilot in the National Chinese Air Force, and stayed in Taiwan. He was killed in Vietnam flying cargo for China Air Transport into Saigon in support of the US war efforts, in 1974.) After General Mow had fled to Mexico in early 1951, Pauline and her sons had to vacate their diplomatic housing in Washington, DC, and settled in Great Neck, New York. Without the support of General Mow, unable to return to Taiwan, not willing to move back to mainland China under communist control, and not being American citizens, the family struggled. They opened a Chinese restaurant, the Yangtze River Cafe, to provide some income. Luckily several of the Mow brothers had already been enrolled in a private boarding school (Riverdale Country School in Riverdale, NY), which agreed to waive the enrollment fees once the family fell on hard times. Growing up under these difficult circumstances, which were detailed by Van C. Mow in a 2005 lecture, Pauline managed to send all of her sons to college.

Harry C.C. Mow, who was born in 1930, "became the father figure for his four younger brothers" when General Mow fled the US in December 1951. He received a PhD degree in electrical engineering from Rensselaer Polytechnic Institute (RPI) in Troy, NY, in 1959. He married shortly following his graduation, and in 1963 moved with his family to Southern California. There he worked for the RAND Corporation, a nonprofit "think tank" of the U.S. Air Force, in Santa Monica. During the real estate boom of the late 1970s and 1980s, Harry left RAND and formed Century West Development Inc. As CEO and chairman of the board he led the developed of many real estate projects in the greater Los Angeles area and across the country. At the same time Harry became also a partner and member of the board of directors of the King's Seafood Company. He went on to become a member of the boards of directors of the UCLA Hospital, Preferred Bank of LA, and the Center for the Partially Sighted. He died on 1 March 2005, in Malibu, CA, leaving behind his wife, two daughters and two sons.

Donald Mow was born on 22 August 1932. After the family moved to the US in 1949, he attended Riverdale Country School and graduate in 1952. He received a bachelor's degree in architecture from RPI, in 1956. He went on to work for several architectural firms in New York City and was involved in the construction of the TWA terminal at JFK airport. Eventually, he became a self-employed architect with an office in Pleasantville, NY. He lived in Briarcliff Manor, NY for over 20 years. When he died on 16 February 2015 in Beijing, China, he was survived by his ex-wife Shirley Lau Mow and two sons, Douglas and Christopher, as well as his granddaughter, Jessica Mow.

William C. W. Mow was born on 18 April 1936 in Hangzhou, China. After graduating from Riverdale Country School in 1955, he earned a BSEE from Rensselaer Polytechnic, MSEE from Polytechnic Institute of Brooklyn and a PhD degree in Electrical Engineering from Purdue University in 1967. He became famous as the founder and CEO of Bugle Boy Industries, a clothing company especially known for its brand of denim jeans. During the 1980s sales approached $1 billion, making Bugle Boy one of the largest privately owned apparel companies in the United States. In the late 1990s the company started to struggle and in 2001 declared bankruptcy. In 1999, William donated part of his fortune to Riverdale Country School, the school that had helped the family in the early 1950s. In turn, the school named their Main Building on Hill Campus William C.W. Mow Hall. He passed away on June 11, 2026.

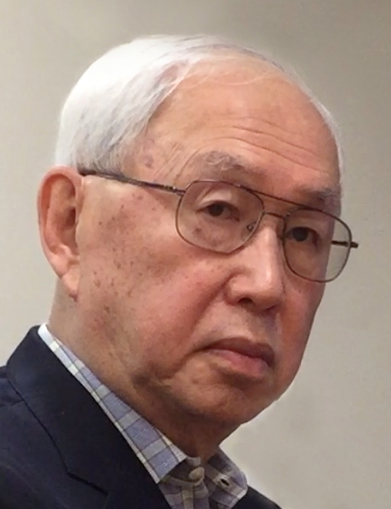
Van C. Mow at the Univ. of Miami, 2014.

Van C. Mow was born as the 5th son on 10 January 1939 in Chengdu, China. Like his three brothers before him, Mow also got his BS degree from RPI. In addition he pursued a PhD in applied mechanics and applied mathematics. Subsequently, he became one of the earliest researchers in the field of biomechanics, was elected President of the Orthopaedic Research Society and, in 2000, became the founding chair of the Department of Biomedical Engineering at Columbia University. Following a highly public dispute with the Dean of the Engineering School, Mow stepped down from his position in 2011. He is one of the few scholars who have been elected to both the National Academy of Engineering (1991) and the National Academy of Medicine (2015). In 2005, Van Mow donated material related to his father's efforts in the China-Burma-India Theater to the Beijing University of Aeronautics and Astronautics Aviation Museum, forgoing the Republic of China Air Force Museum in Taipei, Taiwan.

The youngest son, Maurice Mow, received a degree in civil engineering from RPI, in 1963. He went on to become the Chair of the Department of Civil Engineering at the California State University at Chico. Under his leadership civil engineering students achieved unprecedented successes in regional and national student competitions. Dr. Mow has also played a significant role in forging numerous corporate partnerships that have resulted in greater employment for graduates. He retired in 2003.
