= Children's Library Discovery Center =

Building in Queens, New York

- Location within New York

General information
- Location: 89-11 Merrick Boulevard, Jamaica, Queens, NY, U.S. 11432
- Coordinates: 40.7077°N 73.7970°W

Technical details
- Floor count: 2

Design and construction
- Architect: 1100 Architect

The Children's Library Discovery Center, in Jamaica, Queens, New York, is an addition to the Queens Central Library building. It was commissioned by the New York City Department of Design & Construction and completed in 2011 under the New York City Design and Construction Excellence program.

The center is the Queens Borough Public Library system's largest facility. With a $1.8 million grant from the National Science Foundation, the center recruited specialists from the Exploratorium in San Francisco to design hands-on "discovery stations". The stations, geared toward children ages 3–12, introduce them to diverse topics such as weather, music, and nanotechnology. According to Queens Library CEO Thomas Galante, the embedding of museum-like exhibits into a reading space as exemplified by the center is unique among public libraries in the United States.

The 22,000-square-foot, two-story building was designed by 1100 Architect, with graphics and wayfinding designed by Lee H. Skolnick Architecture & Design Partnership. The exterior is a conspicuous glass façade scaled to match the existing mix of low-rises in the neighborhood.

== History ==
The library opened in 2011. The addition of the Children's Library Discovery Center is significant to the community of Jamaica, Queens, as it serves a diverse and marginalized population of New York City. The services provided by the center are not easily available to Queens residents.

The adjacent 275,000-square-foot (25,500 m^{2}) Queens Central Library building was designed by York & Sawyer in 1966. As the first major branch of an urban library to place all public services on one floor, its design was representative of a new building trend towards functional library design. The new addition to the existing library was proposed under New York's Design and Construction Excellence program—a federal plan started in the mid-1990s that sought to bring better design to government buildings. The program, led by Department of Design and Construction Commissioner David J. Burney, guarantees market-rate fees to architects with the intent to encourage fresh young talent in the city.

== Awards ==
In 2011, the building received two awards: the Queens Library Foundation, Award for Excellence in Design; and the Queens Chamber of Commerce, Building Award: New Construction/Public Building. In 2012 it won the Municipal Art Society of New York, MASterworks Award: Best Neighborhood Catalyst, and in 2013, the NYLA-PLA Award.
