= David J. Burney =

American architect

- Born: Liverpool, England
- Education: Edinburgh College of Art, The Bartlett University College London
- Occupations: Academic Coordinator at Pratt Institute, Commissioner at the New York City Department of Design and Construction
- Awards: Fellow, American Institute of Architects('08), Thomas Jefferson Award ('11)
- Buildings: New York City Housing Authority(1999-2003)

David Burney is a public architect and educator. He was born in Liverpool, England and educated at Edinburgh College of Art and The Bartlett Faculty of the Built Environment of University College London (UCL). He was the co-founder of the Masters degree program in Urban Placemaking and Management at Pratt Institute and served as commissioner of the New York City Department of Design and Construction. He has lived in New York since 1982.

== Education and career ==
Mr. Burney is a fellow of the American Institute of Architects (2008), and a Visitng Professor of the Graduate Center for Planning of Pratt Institute School of Architecture. He is a member of the Board of The Center for Active Design, a nonprofit organization that supports public health by increasing opportunities for physical activity and healthy eating through the design of the built environment, established in 2012 as a key initiatives from New York City Mayor Michael Bloomberg’s Obesity Taskforce. Mr. Burney often appeared before NYC's Public Design Commission, (previously The Municipal Art Commission).

Mr. Burney is the first architect to have served as Commissioner of the Department of Design and Construction ("DDC"), from 2004 to 2014, the entity charged with managing capital projects for multiple city agencies, including the NYC Departments of Transportation and Environmental Protection, and borough-wide cultural institutions, such as libraries, courthouses, fire stations, and police precincts, and museums. Appointed by then-mayor Michael Bloomberg, Mr. Burney launched a City-wide initiative in 2006, the Design + Construction Excellence ("D+CE"), to raise the quality of design and construction of public realm projects throughout New York City. To accomplish the goal, Mr. Burney innovated a new peer review process, and of his accomplishments, his colleagues have said that he "...changed many places from an eyesore to something that residents can be proud of." He authored a book about civic building and infrastructure works achieved under his leadership at DDC, We Build the City: New York City's Design + Construction Excellence Program,(2014), which includes a foreword by Mayor Bloomberg.

Prior to leading DDC, Mr. Burney was Director of Design and Capital Improvement of the New York City Housing Authority ("NYCHA") from 1990 to 2003. While at NYCHA, Mr. Burney oversaw the construction and renovation of 100 community center facilities, often attached to affordable housing developments. Under the leadership of Mr. Burney, NYCHA was awarded a Special Commendation Award from the Cooper Hewitt, Smithsonian Design Museum (2002). Burney has produce influential publications, including The “Active Design Guidelines” report, in collaboration with the NYC AIA.

Mr. Burney moved to New York in 1982. Mr. Burney contributed to various architectures projects, including Zeckendorf Towers on Union Square and the Rose Building at Lincoln Center in Manhattan while practicing at the private firm of Davis Brody & Associates, until 1990, the same year the firm merged with Bond Ryder & Associates to become Davis Brody Bond, and J. Max Bond Jr. became a partner.

=== Professional Recognition ===
Mr. Burney has received professional recognition from the American Institute of Architects ("AIA") NYC Chapter Public Architecture Award (1996), Sloane Public Service Award (2003), Center for Architecture Award (2006), NY State Chapter AIA Presidents' Award's (2007), the American Institute of Architects Thomas Jefferson Award for Public Architecture (2011), and the New York City Chapter of the AIA Public Service Award (2012).

=== Completed projects ===
- NYCHA Saratoga Avenue Community Center, Brownsville, Brooklyn, N.Y.; Architect : George Ranalli, Architect.
- FDNY Engine 277, Ladder 112 Bushwick, N.Y.; Architect : STV Group, Inc.
- FDNYRescue Company 3, Bronx, N.Y.; Architect : Polshek Partnership
- Queens Library, Queens, N.Y.; Architect : Marble Fairbanks
- Renovation of Central Park Precinct Station House Manhattan, N.Y.
- New York City Hall Renovation. Manhattan, N.Y.
- Brooklyn Children's Museum, Brooklyn, N.Y.; Architect : Rafael Viñoly.
- Children's Library Discovery Center, in Jamaica, Queens, New York.

=== Projects in progress ===
- 121 Precinct Station, Staten Island, N.Y. Architect: Rafael Viñoly.
