= Van C. Mow =

Chinese-American bioengineer (born 1939)

Van C. Mow (毛昭憲)
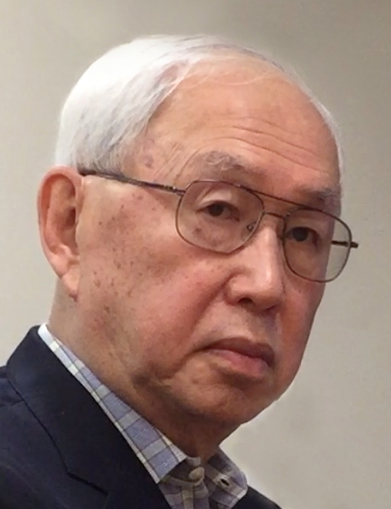
- Van C. Mow in Miami, FL, 2014
- Born: January 10, 1939 (age 87); Chengdu, China
- Education: Rensselaer Polytechnic Institute
- Known for: Cartilage, Biomechanics
- Scientific career
- Fields: Biomedical Engineering
- Workplaces: Columbia University
- Doctoral students: Kyriacos A. Athanasiou, Lori Ann Setton
- Website: bme.columbia.edu/van-c-mow

Van C. Mow (Chinese: 毛昭憲; pinyin: Máo Zhāoxiàn; born January 10, 1939) is a Chinese-born-American bioengineer, known as one of the earliest researchers in the field of biomechanics.

Van C. Mow has published over 315 full-length peer-reviewed, archival papers and book chapters, has delivered over 450 podium presentations at bioengineering meetings, and he has delivered over 450 invited seminars, keynote, plenary and distinguished named lectures in orthopaedic biomechanics. According to Google Scholar, his papers have been cited over 62,000 times, and he has an h-index of 125 as of August 31, 2026.

His work on the biphasic and triphasic theories for soft-hydrated and charged biological tissues, coauthored with W.M. Lai, are two of the most highly cited biomechanics papers in the world.

Among Mow's many activities, he was the first PhD to be elected President of the Orthopaedic Research Society and from 2000 to 2011 was the founding chair of the Department of Biomedical Engineering at Columbia University. In honor of his contributions to the field of biomechanics, the Bioengineering Division of the American Society of Mechanical Engineers established the Van C. Mow medal in 2004. This medal is awarded annually to a mid-career engineer who has demonstrated excellence in biomechanics research, education, and leadership.

== Early life and education ==
Mow's ancestral hometown is Ngai Tou, in Fenghua, Zhejiang, China. He was born in Chengdu, Sichuan, in 1939 during the 2nd Sino-Japanese War, as the 5th of 6 brothers.

His father Mow Pang Tzu, was a nephew of Mao Fumei, the first wife of Chiang Kai-shek, the leader of the Republic of China between 1928 and 1975. Mow Pang Tzu graduated from the 3rd class of China's Whampoa Military Academy in 1927 and later became Lt. General of the Republic of China Air Force. In the late 30th and early 40th, General Mow was largely responsible for bringing Captain Chennault, the father of the Flying Tigers, to China. In addition, he was instrumental in establishing the Burma-China airlift (typically referred to as "The Hump"). In 1942, General Mow was assigned to the U.S. to establish the Chinese Air Force Office in Washington, DC. In August 1945, he was awarded the U.S. Legion of Merit by President Harry Truman, for "exceptionally meritorious conduct in the performance of outstanding services to the Government of the United States from February 1943 to August 1945." In 1949 his wife, Wong Ay Chuan, and five of his six sons (Van, Maurice, Donald, Harry and William C. W. Mow) joined General Mow in Washington, DC, where they lived in a diplomatic residence on 32nd Street, N.W.

In the early fifties, General Mow became entangled in an embezzlement scandal that was covered in great detail in major US and Chinese newspapers and even let to a congressional hearing. The Chiang Kai-shek government of the Republic of China alleged that General Mow failed to account for $19,440,000 (equivalent to about $180,000,000 in 2015). After a protracted legal battle, during which General Mow fled to Mexico^{[7]} and shared a "luxury" prison cell with the Leon Trotsky assassin Ramón Mercader. General Mow eventually returned to the US in the mid-sixties. A detailed account of these events aired on Chinese TV in May 2015.

Growing up under difficult circumstances, which he detailed in a 2005 lecture, Mow managed to obtain a bachelor's degree in aeronautical engineering from Rensselaer Polytechnic Institute (RPI) in 1962. After graduation, Mow decided to pursue a Ph.D. degree at Rensselaer in applied mechanics and applied mathematics. In his thesis he developed a perturbation mathematical method to predict secondary vortex flows in polymeric fluids. Five Mow brothers (Van, Maurice, Donald, Harry and William, founder of Bugle Boy Industries, a clothing manufacturer) received a total of 3 Ph.D. degrees in mechanics and applied mathematics, one bachelor's degree each in architecture and electrical engineering from RPI.

== Career ==
Following his doctoral graduation in 1966, Mow went on for a postdoctoral fellowship in applied mathematics at the Courant Institute of Mathematical Sciences at New York University with Joseph B. Keller. One year later, he joined the Applied Mechanics and Mathematics Group at Bell Labs working on computer programs for U.S. sonar detection of submarines off the East Coast of America. He returned to RPI in 1969 as associate professor of Applied Mechanics. In 1976, he was promoted to the rank of Professor, and received a visiting scientist position at the Skeletal Research Laboratory of Harvard Medical School with Melvin J. Glimcher. The following year, to broaden his prospective, Mow received the coveted NATO Senior Postdoctoral Fellowship to visit eight European countries each with universities with noted research in bioengineering. In 1982, Mow was awarded the John A. Clark and Edward T. Crossan Endowed Chair Professorship in Engineering from Rensselaer.

Mow moved to Columbia University in the city of New York in 1986 as the Anne Y. Stein Endowed Chair professor in Mechanical Engineering and Orthopaedic Bioengineering. There he started to work on new ways to map joints, such as the knee, shoulder and wrist, for surgical precision. In December 1995, he received an invitation from Executive Vice Provost Michael M. Crow and Provost Jonathan R. Cole, to lead the formation of a new Department of Biomedical Engineering (DBME) at Columbia University and became the inaugural chair from 2000 to 2010. Following a highly public dispute with Feniosky Peña-Mora, the Dean of the Engineering School, Mow stepped down from his position in 2011. Mow retired in 2018.

== Honours ==
In 1991 Mow was elected a member of the National Academy of Engineering "For major contributions toward orthopedic engineering, particularly understanding the physical behavior of cartilage and the arthritic process." In 2004, ASME established the Van C. Mow Medal for its Bioengineering Division to be bestowed upon an individual who has demonstrated meritorious contributions to the field of bioengineering; the individual must have earned a Ph.D. or equivalent degree between 10 and 20 years of the award.

Awards and honors in 1980s and 1990s

- Kappa Delta-Elizabeth Winston Lanir Award, Best Research in Orthopaedics, AAOS, 1980
- President, Orthopaedic Research Society, 1982-1983 (First PhD President)
- Melville Medal, Highest ASME honor for original paper, 1982
- Japanese Society for the Promotion of Science Fellowship, 1986
- Fogarty Senior International Fellowship, 1987
- HR Lissner Award for Contributions to Bioengineering, ASME, 1987
- Bristol-Myers/Zimmer Award for Excellence in Orthopaedic Research, 1990
- Elected to the United States National Academy of Engineering (1991)
- Giovani Borelli Award, American Society of Biomechanics, 1991
- College of Fellows, American Institute of Medical and Biological Engineering, Founding Member, Elected 1992
- Elected to the United States National Academy of Medicine (1998; 2015)
- ASME Robert Henry Thurston Lecture Award, November 18, 1998

Awards and honours since 2000

- Academic Advisor to Crown Princess Maha Chakri Sirindhorn for the Development of Biomedical Engineering in Thailand, 2003–07
- Elected to the Academia Sinica (2004)
- Namesake for ASME Medal: The Van C. Mow Medal for Excellence in Bioengineering (2005) Van C. Mow Medal, ASME
- Davies Medal for Outstanding Alumni Achievements, Rensselaer Polytechnic Institute, April 6, 2006
- Distinguished Lecturer, Biomedical Engineering Department, University of Virginia, November 3, 2006
- Named Lecture Series: The Annual Van C. Mow Lecture Series in Applied Mechanics, Rensselaer Polytechnic Institute, 2006
- Hunter Distinguished Scientist Lecture, Molecular and Cellular Basis for Cartilage Functional Tissue Engineering—Role of Biomechanics, Biomedical Engineering Department, Clemson University, April 5, 2007
- Distinguished Lecturer in Biomechanical Engineering, Molecular and Cellular Biomechanics of Articular Cartilage, Stanford University, June 4–5, 2007
- Elected to the Academy of Sciences for the Developing World (2008)
- OARSI Outstanding Basic Science Award, OARSI World Congress, Rome, Italy, September 18, 2008
- Named Top 10 Mechanical Engineering Graduate from RPI for the Centennial Celebration of the ME Department, April 2008
- William Mong Distinguished Lecture, University of Hong Kong, November 21, 2009
- Distinguished Visiting professor, University of Hong Kong, spring semester, 2012
- Distinguished Visiting professor, University of California, San Diego, spring semester, 2013
- Richard Skalak Memorial Lecture, University of California, San Diego, March 15, 2013
- Distinguished Lecturer and visiting professor, School of Engineering, University of Miami, March 24, 2014

== Family ==
In 1973 Mow married Barbara Hoffman, who studied psychology at the University of Vermont. Her graduate work was done at Rockefeller School of Public Affairs. They live together in Briarcliff Manor, NY. Van C. Mow has 2 sons from a previous marriage.

Jonathan, born in 1965, was promoted to chief executive officer (CEO) of PhaseBio Pharmaceuticals, Inc, in March 2015. Previously he was the Chief Business Officer (CBO) at this privately held, clinical-stage biotechnology company that is developing novel drugs to treat metabolic and cardiovascular diseases. Jonathan was also involved in two venture capital biotech/pharma businesses in Seattle that were sold for $700 million in 2000 and $350 million in 2006. Jonathan received an MBA from the Tepper School of Business at Carnegie Mellon University and a Bachelor of Science from the University of California, Berkeley. He and his family reside in the San Diego area.

Mow's second son, Kelvin, was born in 1968. He is a Senior Executive at Brita Group. Kelvin received his MBA from the Leeds School of Business at University of Colorado. He and his family reside in Hong Kong.
