= William C. W. Mow =

Chinese-born American engineer and businessman (1936–2026)

- 毛昭寰
- Born: Mow Chao Wei; March 28, 1936; Hangzhou, China
- Died: June 11, 2026 (aged 90)
- Education: Rensselaer Polytechnic Institute; Polytechnic Institute of Brooklyn; Purdue University (PhD)
- Occupations: Engineer, businessman
- Known for: Founder, chairman and CEO of Bugle Boy Industries
- Spouses: Margarita Lee Ling Mow; Rosa Wang Mow
- Children: 4
- Relatives: Mow Pang Tsu (father); Van C. Mow (brother)

William C. W. Mow (Chinese: 毛昭寰; March 28, 1936 – June 11, 2026), known as Bill Mow, was a Chinese-born American electrical engineer and businessman. He founded the semiconductor test-equipment company Macrodata in 1969 and was the founder, chairman and chief executive officer of Bugle Boy Industries, a clothing company known for its casualwear and jeans during the 1980s and 1990s.

== Early life and education ==
Mow was born Mow Chao Wei in Hangzhou, China, on March 28, 1936, the fourth of six sons of Lieutenant General Mow Pang Tsu of the Republic of China Air Force and his wife, Wong Ay Chuan. During his early childhood the family moved with his father's military career through Chongqing, Chengdu and Shanghai. In 1949, as the Chinese Communists came to power, the family fled the mainland—by Mow's account on the last Pan Am flight out of Shanghai—and his parents and five of their sons settled in the United States. His father, a general and diplomat under Nationalist leader Chiang Kai-shek, continued working in the United States for the Nationalist government, but in 1951 he ran afoul of officials in Taipei and fled to Mexico to avoid legal proceedings; Mow would go nearly two decades without seeing him. Left without support, his mother borrowed money to open the Yangtze River Cafe, a small restaurant in Great Neck, New York.

He attended Riverdale Country School in New York City, where, after his family could no longer afford the tuition, he was allowed to remain on scholarship in exchange for working as the school's morning receptionist; he worked at the family restaurant on weekends and sold egg rolls to classmates during the week, an experience he later described as his first venture in business. He earned a Bachelor of Science in electrical engineering from Rensselaer Polytechnic Institute in 1959, a Master of Science in electrical engineering from the Polytechnic Institute of Brooklyn in 1961, and a Ph.D. in electrical engineering from Purdue University in 1967, studying under King-Sun Fu; his doctoral research concerned computational methods. Between his master's and doctoral studies he worked as a research associate in Rensselaer's microwave laboratory and then as a logic engineer at Honeywell's data-processing division, where he first worked with integrated circuits.

Several of Mow's brothers also became engineers or academics, including Van C. Mow, a professor of biomechanics at Columbia University, and Maurice Mow, who chaired the civil-engineering department at California State University, Chico.

== Engineering career and Macrodata ==
After completing his doctorate, Mow worked as a program manager at Litton Industries' guidance-and-control division in Los Angeles, where he spent about two years designing computers for guidance and control systems and became interested in large-scale integration. In 1969 he founded Macrodata, based in Woodland Hills, built on his method for testing large-scale integrated circuits and financed largely by outside investors who took a majority stake in exchange for capital and loans. Within about five years the company's annual sales approached $12 million, and its customers included leading semiconductor and computer manufacturers such as Intel, Motorola and Siemens. Mow regarded Macrodata as the high point of his engineering career, and he later said he regretted having taken it public; by his account, examples of its test equipment were preserved in a German technology museum. Macrodata went public in 1973 and was acquired by the Milwaukee-based conglomerate Cutler-Hammer in the mid-1970s.

Mow remained chairman and chief executive, but in April 1976 the new owners confronted him over a roughly $2 million understatement of losses, replaced him as president and moved him to a nominal post before he resigned within a week. Cutler-Hammer referred the matter to the U.S. Securities and Exchange Commission, which filed a civil fraud suit against Mow and other executives; in 1978 Mow signed a consent decree, neither admitting nor denying the allegations and agreeing not to violate securities laws in the future. Maintaining his innocence, Mow sued Cutler-Hammer, alleging that it had made him a scapegoat. In 1988, after about $400,000 in legal fees, a California appeals court upheld a $17.6 million judgment against Cutler-Hammer's parent, Eaton Corporation, finding that Cutler-Hammer executives had intentionally understated Macrodata's losses and blamed Mow; Eaton paid Mow $820,000 to end his related lawsuit.

== Bugle Boy ==
Mow said the Macrodata episode left him determined to vindicate himself, and that he needed income to sustain a decade-long legal fight against Cutler-Hammer; at the suggestion of golfing acquaintances, and having relatives already in the garment trade, he reinvented himself in apparel. After leaving Macrodata, Mow set up Dragon International in 1976 as an agency importing garments and other goods, and in 1977 he and Stanley "Bucky" Buchthal—an executive at a jeans firm, whose nickname inspired the company's name—founded Buckaroo International, Inc., a wholesale and retail clothing venture. In 1980 he renamed the company Bugle Boy Industries and focused it on jeans and casual pants, including parachute pants, promoted through a 1988 television campaign whose tagline—"Excuse me, are those Bugle Boy jeans you're wearing?"—became widely recognized. Drawing on his engineering background, Mow invested early in computerized design, inventory and distribution systems and in electronic data interchange with retailers. The privately held company grew rapidly during the 1980s on the strength of parachute pants and then cargo pants, and in its 1990 fiscal year it earned roughly $44 million on sales of about $480 to $500 million, making it one of the largest apparel firms in Southern California. When the cargo-pants boom faded after 1990 the company nearly failed, and Mow restructured it into a full-line apparel maker for males of all ages; he considered taking Bugle Boy public to raise capital but kept it private, owning about 90 percent before buying out his president and partner Vincent Nesi's remaining stake in 1995. Mow set a public goal of $1 billion in annual sales that the company never reached, and he expanded its operations internationally, including into China. Bugle Boy filed for Chapter 11 bankruptcy in February 2001 with more than $100 million in debt; Mow resigned shortly before the filing, and the company was liquidated. In March 2001 its trademark, accounts receivable and wholesale inventory were sold to Schottenstein Stores Corp. for $68.6 million after a 22-round auction.

== Philanthropy and board service ==
Mow served on the boards of Riverdale Country School, Rensselaer Polytechnic Institute and the John Thomas Dye School in Los Angeles, and supported those institutions as well as Purdue University. His name is attached to William C. W. Mow Hall at Riverdale Country School and to an annual scholarship program at Rensselaer Polytechnic Institute, and he delivered commencement addresses at Rensselaer and Purdue.

== Personal life and death ==
Mow was married twice. He married Margarita Lee Ling Mow in 1959, and the couple, who had daughters Genevieve and Katherine, divorced in the early 1980s during the difficult early years of Bugle Boy—a period strained by the financial pressure of the new business and by Mow's frequent transpacific travel; Margarita worked as a medical technician and had little affinity for the garment trade. He later married Rosa Wang Mow, whom he had met in 1978 when she was a student working in Dragon International's Taipei office, and to whom he was married for 42 years. He had four children. Bugle Boy became something of a family enterprise: Rosa Mow oversaw the company's daily operations and became its president and chief operating officer in 1996, while two of Mow's daughters, Genevieve and Katherine, held senior marketing and creative positions. Although his career was often cited as an Asian American success story, Mow said in a 1990 profile that he declined minority business awards because he did not regard himself as a disadvantaged minority.

Mow died on June 11, 2026, at the age of 90. He was survived by his wife, his four children and his brothers Van and Maurice, and was predeceased by his brothers David, Harry and Donald.

== Honors ==
Mow's honors included being named Southern California Entrepreneur of the Year (1989), Rensselaer Polytechnic Institute's Distinguished Alumni Entrepreneur (1990), the Juvenile Diabetes Foundation's Father of the Year (1991), the World Trade Hall of Fame Award (1994), Purdue University's Distinguished Engineering Alumnus Award (1995), and the Distinguished Alumnus Citation of the Polytechnic Alumni (2000).
