= 1100 Architect =

Architecture firm

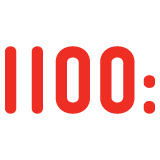

Practice information
- Partners: David Piscuskas, Juergen Riehm
- Founded: 1983
- Location: New York City, United States and Frankfurt, Germany

1100 Architect is an architecture firm based in New York City and Frankfurt founded by principals David Piscuskas and Juergen Riehm. It provides architectural design, programming, space analysis, interior design, and master planning services to both public and private clients, and its work includes educational and arts institutions, libraries, offices, residences, retail environments, and civic facilities.

The company was founded in 1983 in SoHo, Manhattan as a design studio of three architecture school graduates. As of 2015, the firm has 44 employees.

== Projects ==
The company's designs include institutional, residential, and commercial buildings. Projects include the design for the Children's Library Discovery Center in New York City, Calvert Vaux Park Facility in New York City, and a residential house in Palm Beach, Florida.

Other projects include

- In Manhattan, New York City:

- Riverside Health Center
- The New York University Department of Linguistics Building
- New York Public Library (Battery Park City Branch)
- Irish Hunger Memorial
- Little Red School House & Elisabeth Irwin High School (2002)

- Elsewhere in New York:

- Hudson River House, Putnam County
- Brooklyn Brownstone, Brooklyn
- Repertoire, New York
- Museum of Modern Art, New York Design Store

- Elsewhere:

- Office for Brand New School, Los Angeles, California
- HM/FM House, Truro, Massachusetts
- House on Bergstrasse, Seeheim-Jugenheim, Germany

== Recognition ==
1100 received the 2014 ALA/IIDA Library Design Awards for Best of Competition Winner and Best Public Library 30,000 Sq. Ft & Smaller and the 2013 NYLA-PLA Award for the Queens Central Library Children's Library Discovery Center in Queens, New York.

In 2013, the company's design for a house in Palm Beach, Florida received the Elizabeth L. and John H. Schuler Award.

=== Other awards ===
- 2015 - SARA Silver Award of Honor, Queens Central Library, Children's Library Discovery Center, Queens, NY
- 2015 - NYC PDC Award for Excellence in Design, NYC Parks Department, Calvert Vaux Park Facility, Brooklyn, NY
- 2014 - ALA/IIDA Library Interior Design Awards for Best of Competition Winner, Queens Central Library, Children's Library Discovery Center, Queens, NY
- 2014 - ALA/IIDA Library Interior Design Awards for Best Public Library 30,000 Sq. Ft & Smaller, Queens Central Library, Children's Library Discovery Center, Queens, NY
- 2014 - Residential Architect Design Award - Architectural Interiors, Manhattan Triplex, Manhattan, NY
- 2013 - Interior Design, Best of Year Honoree, Brand New School Office, Los Angeles, CA
- 2012 - Contract, Public Space Interiors Award, The New York Public Library, Battery Park City Branch, NY
- 2012 - AIA New York Design Awards, Interiors Merit Award, Manhattan Triplex, Manhattan, NY
- 2012 - AIA New York Design Awards, Merit Award Unbuilt Work Category, Brooklyn Detention Center, Brooklyn, NY
- 2012 - The Municipal Art Society of New York, MASterworks Award: Best Neighborhood Catalyst, Queens Central Library, Children's Library Discovery Center, Queens, NY
- 2011 - The National Terrazzo and Mosaic Association, Port Morris Tile and Marble Corporation Craftsmanship Award, The New York Public Library, Battery Park City Branch, NY
- 2011 - Queens Chamber of Commerce, Building Award: New Construction/Public Building, and Queens Library Foundation, Award for Excellence in Design, Queens Central Library, Children’s Library Discovery Center, Queens, NY
- 2010 - Interior Design, Best of Year Merit Award, New York University Department of Linguistics Building, Manhattan, NY
- 2010 - Interior Design, Best of Year Merit Award, the New York Public Library, Battery Park City Branch, NY

=== Other recognition ===
- 2015 & 2014 - 1100 selected as a member of Departures Magazine Design Council
- 2014 – 1100 is selected as one of "Top 50 Designers" by New York Spaces
- 2013 – 1100 is selected for the 2014 AD100 List
- 2013 – 1100 is recognized as ARCHITECT magazine's "Top 50 in Business"
- 2012 – 1100 is selected as one of "Top 50 Designers" by New York Spaces
