= Queens Public Library =

Library system in Queens, New York

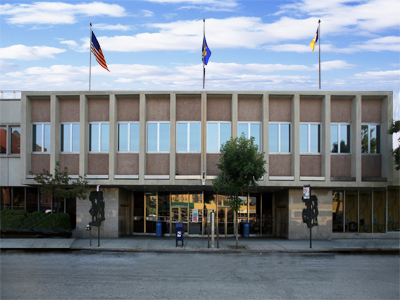
- Queens Central Library in Jamaica, Queens
- 40°42′28″N 073°47′42″W
- Location: Queens, New York City, U.S.
- Type: Public
- Established: 1896; 130 years ago
- Branches: 62

Collection
- Size: 7.5 million items

Access and use
- Circulation: 15.7 million in FY 2014
- Population served: 2,270,338 (Queens)
- Members: nearly 929,000 active borrowers in FY 2014

Other information
- Budget: $128.147 million (FY 2013)
- Director: Dennis Walcott, President and CEO
- Website: www.queenslibrary.org

The Queens Public Library (QPL), also known as the Queens Borough Public Library, is the public library for the borough of Queens, and one of three public library systems serving New York City. It is one of the largest library systems in the world by circulation, having loaned 13.5 million items in the 2015 fiscal year, and one of the largest in the country in terms of the size of its collection. According to its website, the library holds about 7.5 million items, of which 1.4 million are at its central library in Jamaica, Queens. It was named "2009 Library of the Year" by Library Journal.

Although it was organized in 1858 on a subscription basis, the original Central Library on Parsons Boulevard in Jamaica was opened in 1930 and later expanded with a four-story Renaissance Revival themed architecture. Dating back to the foundation of the first Queens library in Flushing in 1858, Queens Public Library has become one of the largest public library systems in the United States, comprising 62 branches throughout the borough. Queens Public Library serves Queens' population of almost 2.3 million, including one of the largest immigrant populations in the country. Consequently, a large percentage of the library's collections are in languages other than English, particularly Spanish, Chinese, Korean and Russian. Queens Public Library is separate from both the New York Public Library, which serves the Bronx, Manhattan, and Staten Island, and the Brooklyn Public Library, which serves only Brooklyn.

== History ==
=== 19th century ===
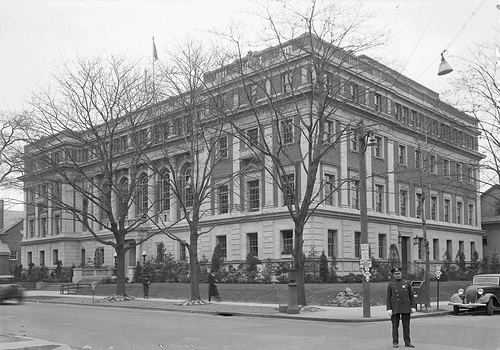
Central Library in November 1935

The first library in Queens was founded in 1858 in Flushing as a subscription service. It became a free circulation library in 1869.

In the late 19th century, several local libraries were founded in western Queens. The libraries in Astoria, Long Island City and Steinway formed the Long Island City Public Library in 1896, becoming Queens' first multi-branch library. In 1901, shortly after the consolidation of Queens into New York City, the city government proposed a new charter joining all libraries in Queens into the Queens Borough Public Library. All of the public libraries signed on, except for Flushing, which remained independent until 1903. The Queens Borough Public Library was officially incorporated in 1907.

=== 20th century ===
Due to the wide variation in population density in Queens, in 1906, the Queens Borough Public Library established small branches in store-fronts and shopping areas under the Traveling Library program. With these branches, Queens Library grew swiftly, eventually opening major branches in almost every Queens neighborhood.

The original Central Library on Parsons Boulevard in Jamaica was opened in 1930 and expanded with Works Progress Administration funds in 1941. It was a splendid four-story Renaissance Revival building. In spite of its elegance, it was too small for the demand and was replaced by a new, more spacious facility in 1966, through the persistent efforts of the Library Director, Harold W. Tucker.

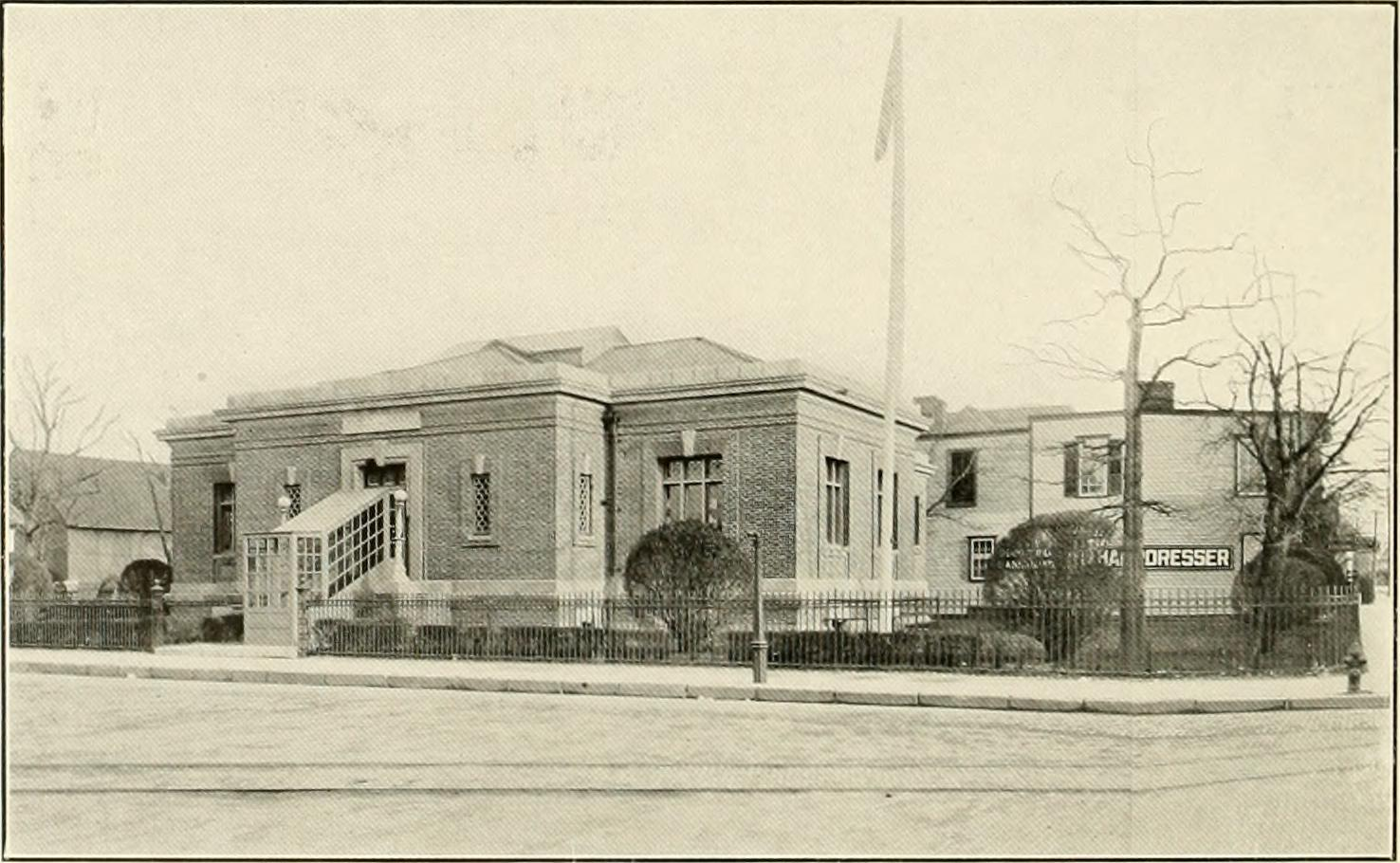
Original Far Rockaway branch, later destroyed by fire

$240,000 donated by Andrew Carnegie was used for the construction of seven new Carnegie libraries between 1904 and 1924 in the most heavily populated areas of the borough. Four of these buildings (Astoria, Poppenhusen, Richmond Hill and Woodhaven) are still in use. They are characterized by their stately solidity and expensive decorative details. The Carnegie-era Flushing Branch was demolished for a more modern building in the 1950s, and the Far Rockaway Branch was destroyed by fire in 1962.

Library branches were added slowly as the borough's population expanded. By 1946, Queens Borough Public Library had 44 branches plus the Central Library and a very active bookmobile.

Many additional branches had been approved to be built between 1954 and 1965, but were not completed due to a New York City fiscal crisis. Additional funds were given to the library system by the federal Library Services and Construction Act to finish the Central Library, Flushing and Far Rockaway branches. In the 1990s interest in completing the proposed branches was revived. In 1998, the new Queens Borough Public Library at Flushing was opened, and four other branches were opened between 1999 and 2007. The Queens Library was allocated more than $269 million in capital funds between fiscal years 2005 and 2013.

The Queens Borough Public Library was renamed the Queens Library sometime in the past.

=== 21st century ===
In April 2019, it was renamed again to Queens Public Library, with the new tagline "We speak your language".

== Administration ==
Queens Public Library is governed by a 19-member Board of Trustees, which are appointed by the mayor of New York City and the borough president of Queens. The mayor, speaker of the city council, borough president, the New York City comptroller and the New York public advocate sit on the board as ex officio members. The library is funded by the city, through state and federal grants, and through private philanthropy. Dennis Walcott was appointed president and CEO in March 2016.

== Branches ==
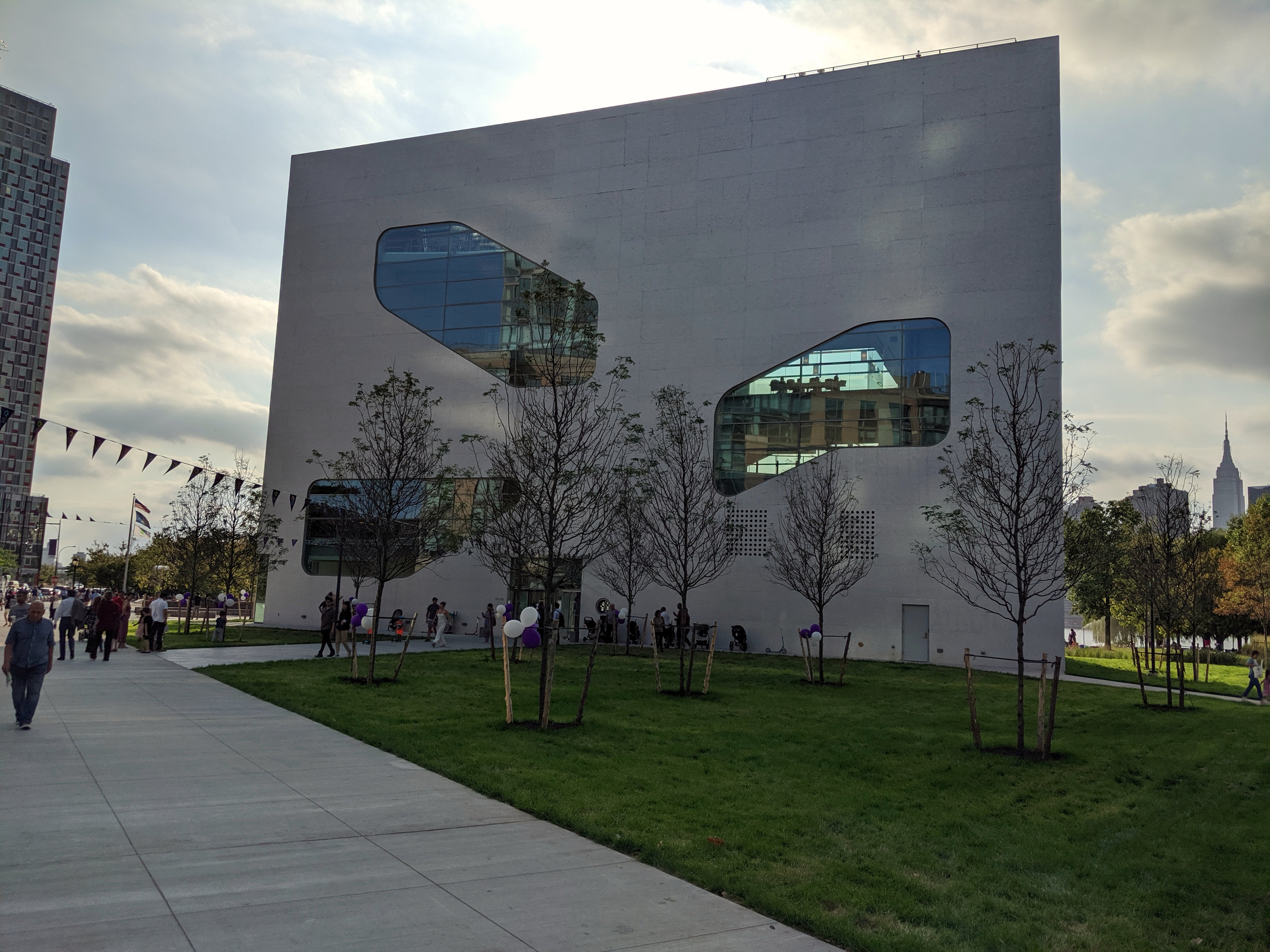
Hunters Point branch in Long Island City

Queens Public Library has 62 locations, seven Adult Learning Centers, two Family Literacy Centers, and a Mobile Library.

=== Central Library ===
Central Library was the first major branch of an urban library to place all public services on one floor. The library cost $5.7 million and contained 195,000 square feet (18,100 m^{2}) of floor space. The library was renovated and expanded in 1989. Additional renovation and expansion was expected to be completed in 2013. A new Children's Library Discovery Center, adjacent to the main library, was designed by 1100 Architect and opened in 2011.

Central Library includes resources that support education and research through the college level. A local history collection (The Archives at Queens Library) houses thousands of photographs, books and ephemera having to do with the history of Queens and the four counties of Long Island. Other special collections include job search/readiness information and training and consumer health information.

=== International Resource Center ===
Queens Library at Flushing is home to the International Resource Center (IRC). It contains books, magazines, CDs and DVDs that represent cultures from all over the world. Queens Library at Flushing has collections in many non-English languages, including Bengali, Chinese, French, Gujarati, Hindi, Italian, Korean, Portuguese, Punjabi, Russian, Spanish, and Urdu.

=== Black Heritage Reference Center ===
The Langston Hughes Library in Corona is home to the Black Heritage Reference Center, which contains materials "written by, about, for, with and related to Black Culture." It is the largest collection of materials dedicated solely to Black culture in New York State.

== Archives at Queens Library ==
The Archives at Queens Library, formerly known as the Long Island Division, is a special collection in the Central Library building that focuses on the history of Brooklyn, Queens, Nassau, and Suffolk counties. The Archives was first founded in 1912. It consists of books, publications, current and historical newspapers, family manuscripts and genealogical material, historical maps and atlases including Belcher Hyde and Sanborn Company maps, late 19th- and early 20th-century photographs, as well as other archival material.

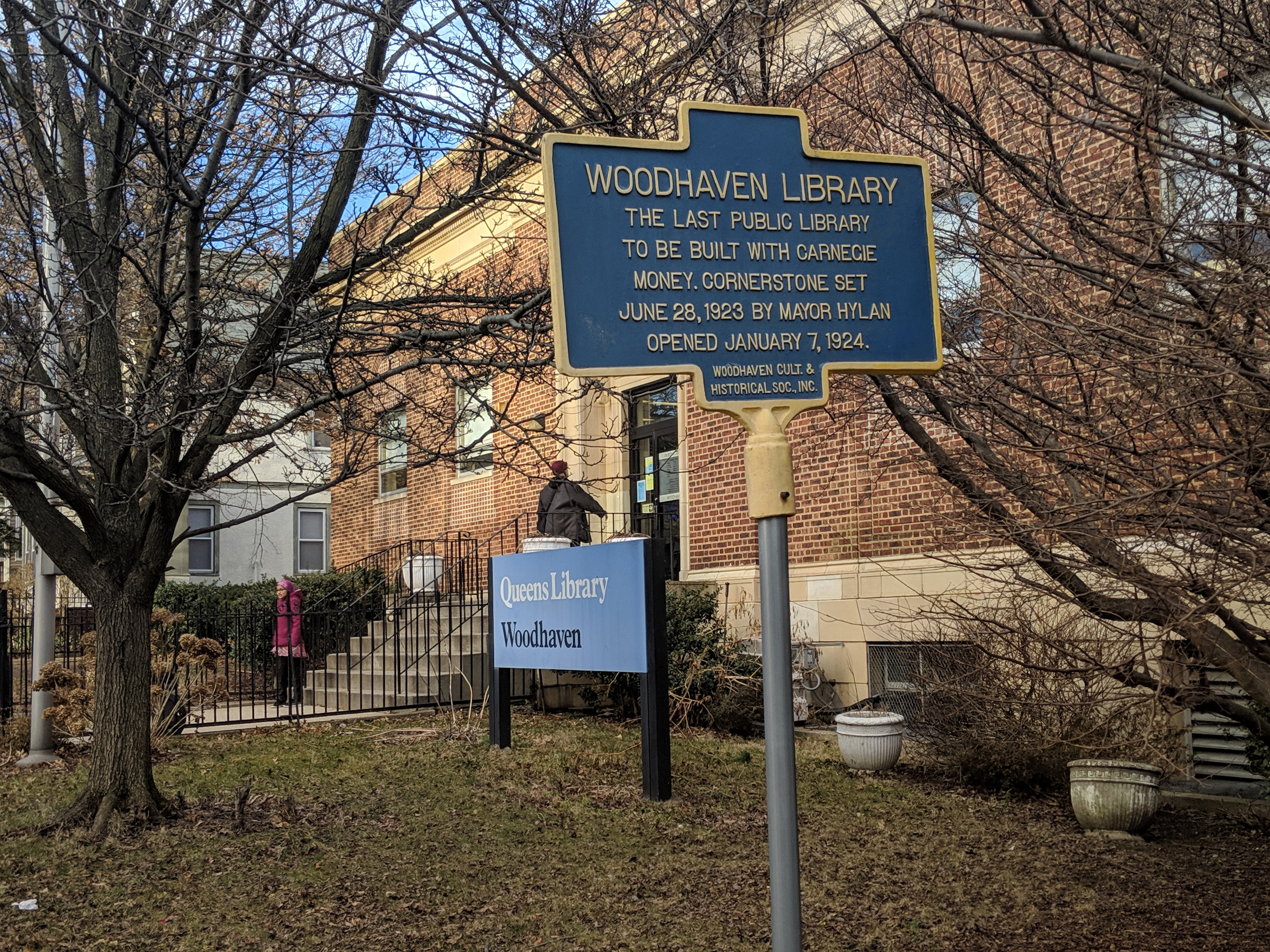
Historic marker outside the Woodhaven branch

The Queens Memory Project, a digital archive which aims to record and preserve contemporary history across the borough of Queens, is a collaborative effort between Queens College and Queens Public Library that includes digitized materials from the Archives.

== Programs and services ==
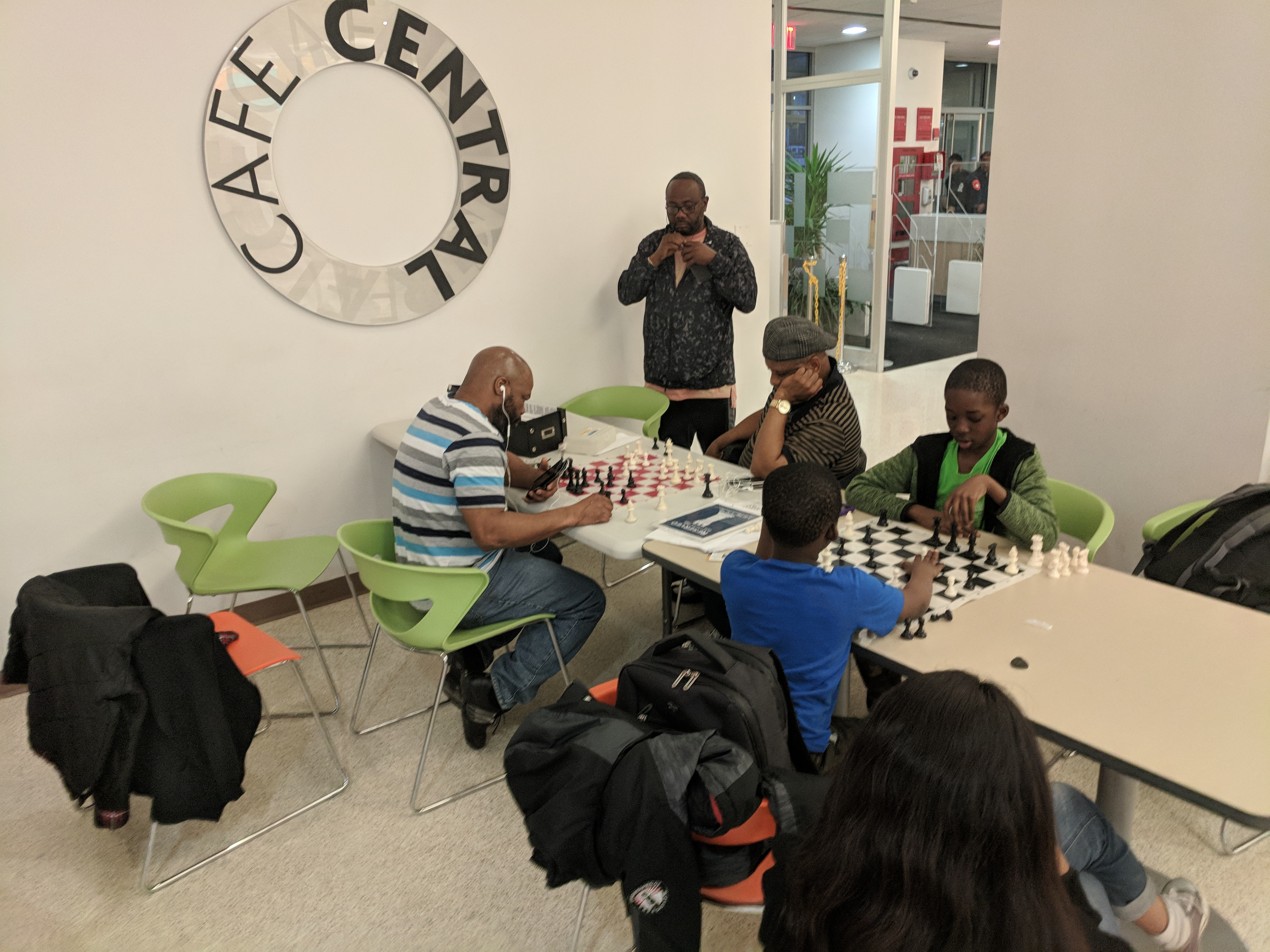
A chess players' cafe

Queens Public Library has long had a variety of services to aid children and teens.

=== STACKS ===
18 Queens Public Library branches participate in the STACKS program, a core-curriculum based after school enrichment program. The program aims to provide homework materials, homework tutors, and monitors. Every Queens Public Library branch also provides an assortment of enriching activities and clubs for children and teens daily.

=== Services for new immigrants ===
Queens Public Library has long been a leader in using library services to help new Americans acculturate. Popular reading and multimedia collections are available in all major immigrant languages in Queens. Coping skills programs and cultural arts programs are conducted in the immigrant languages to attract newcomers. Thousands of people attend free formal classes to learn English and attend informal conversation groups to improve their fluency. Family literacy programs take an inter-generational approach to learning English and include practical information about living in NYC. Programs in civics education, Pathways to Citizenship, programs to help foreign-born professionals gain U.S. certifications, and many other educational, informational and cultural programs make Queens Public Library a model for libraries worldwide. Out-of-state residents can use the QPL for an annual fee of $50.

=== Services to job seekers ===
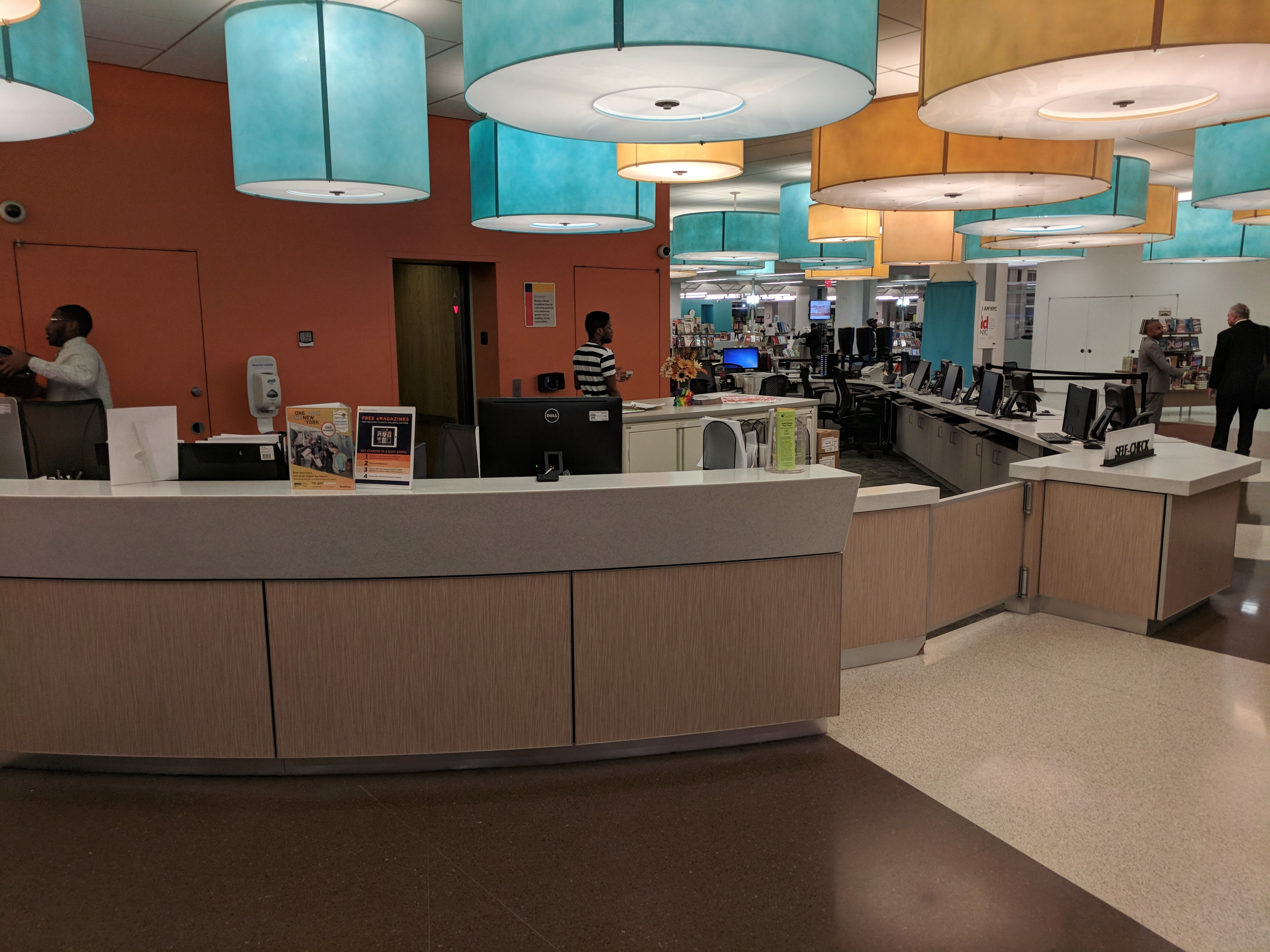
Inside the Central Library

Queens Public Library offers intensive assistance for those who wish to find employment and/or upgrade their job skills. Free services include in-person and online job skills assessments, workshops on dozens of topics that improve computer literacy skills, online learning that leads to professional job skills certifications, resume review, interview preparation, job search assistance. Through a partnership with Workforce 1, job placement assistance is available at the Flushing branch, and near the Central Library in Jamaica.

=== Consumer health ===
Queens Public Library offers consumer health information at all library locations. Through Queens Library HealthLink and Queens Library ConnectCare, library users will receive assistance in finding free or low cost health screenings and/or appointments with primary healthcare providers, regardless of insurance.

== See also ==
- List of Brooklyn Public Library branches
- List of New York Public Library branches
- List of Queens Public Library branches
