= Walk shorts =

Men's clothing item

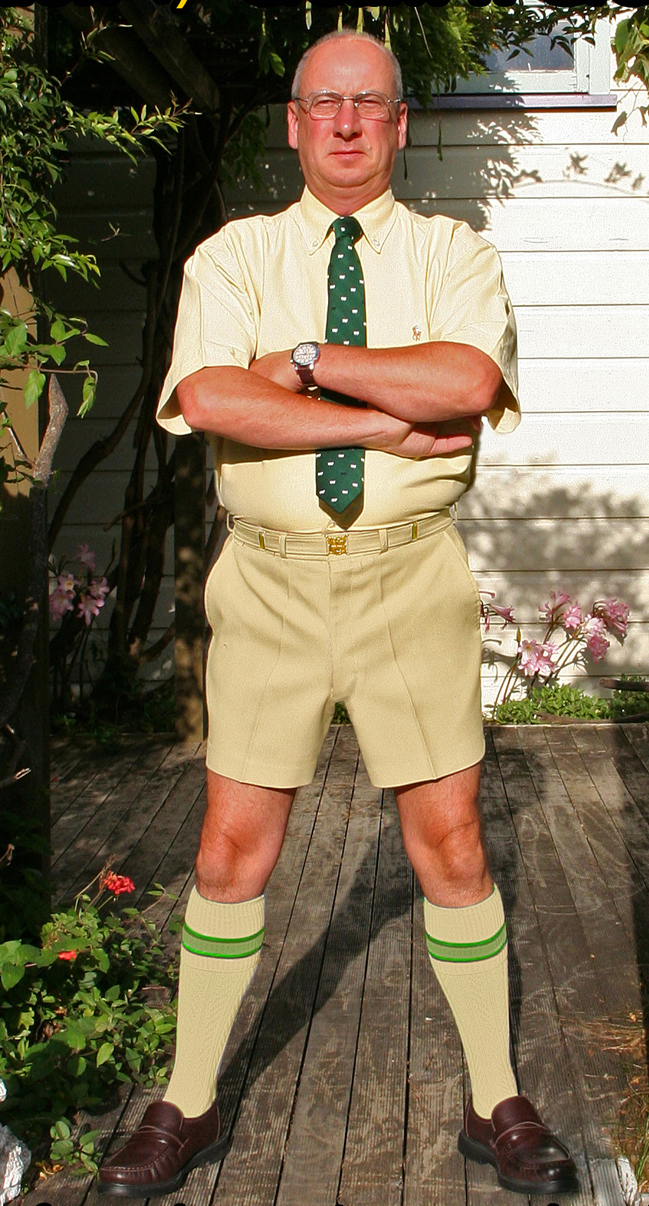
The typical New Zealand formal 'Walk Shorts and Walk Socks' look, popular from the 1950s until the late 1970s/1980s, then seeing a steady decline as a more casual and unkempt appearance swept the nation.

Walk shorts are a men's garment that were popular in New Zealand in the 1960s and 1970s as summer wear for white-collar workers. Walk shorts typically end above the knee and were traditionally worn with knee-high socks and leather shoes or sandals.

The shorts are thought to have had their origins with the baggy khaki drill shorts worn by New Zealand soldiers serving in the Middle East in World War II. In the 1950s, the New Zealand Public Service Association union petitioned the State Services Commission to permit workers to wear shorts. Eventually the Commission permitted staff to wear shorts in "white, grey or fawn", which was later relaxed to allow colour and print fashions of the time.

The walk short is no longer commonly worn in New Zealand but is considered an iconic item of Kiwiana.

== See also ==
- Stubbies (brand)
