= Lori Ann Setton =

American biomechanical engineer

- Born: Queens, New York, US
- Education: Princeton University; Columbia University
- Known for: mechanics mechanobiology of the intervertebral disc articular cartilagemechanics drug delivery pathomechanisms of osteoarthritis
- Awards: AIMBE Fellow (2005); BMES Fellow (2009); Van C. Mow Medal(2007)
- Scientific career
- Fields: Biomechanical Engineer
- Workplaces: Washington University in St. Louis, Duke University
- Doctoral advisor: Van C. Mow
- Website: engineering.wustl.edu/Profiles/Pages/Lori-Setton.aspx

Lori Ann Setton is an American biomechanical engineer noted for her research on mechanics and mechanobiology of the intervertebral disc, articular cartilage mechanics, drug delivery, and pathomechanisms of osteoarthritis. She is currently the department chair as well as the Lucy and Stanley Lopata Distinguished Professor of Biomedical Engineering at McKelvey School of Engineering at Washington University in St. Louis.

== Biography ==
Setton was born in Queens, New York. She received a B.S.E. in Mechanical and Aerospace Engineering from Princeton University in 1984. Subsequently, she pursued graduate degrees under the tutelage of Professor Van C. Mow at Columbia University. She received an M.S. degree and Ph.D degree in Mechanical Engineering/Biomechanics in 1988 and 1993, respectively.

She joined the Department of Biomedical Engineering at Duke University as an assistant professor in 1995. Promotions to tenured associate professor in and professor followed in 2004 and 2007.

Her most noticeable work has documented the biological responses of cartilage and intervertebral disc to mechanical loading, understanding a role for collagen genetic mutations in onset of arthritis and intervertebral disc pathology, development of injectable hydrogels for articular cartilage repair, and development of injectable drug delivery vehicles for fighting inflammation in musculoskeletal disease. As of June 1, 2017, her work has been cited over 17,500 times. She has an h-index of 65.

== Awards ==
Setton has several awards:

- AIMBE Fellow (2005)
- BMES Fellow (2009)
- Van C. Mow Medal (2007)
- ASME Fellow (2018)
- Presidential Early Career Awards for Scientists and Engineers (PECASE) (1997) for "Leadership in education and research in understanding and restoring biomechanical functions to tissue degenerated by injury or aging, especially in the spine
