= Lee H. Skolnick =

American architect (born 1953)

- Born: September 17, 1953 (age 72); New York City, U.S.
- Education: Hamilton College; Cooper Union (BArch)
- Occupation: Architect

Lee H. Skolnick (born September 17, 1953 in New York City) is an American architect and the Founding Partner and Design Principal of SKOLNICK Architecture, a New York-based design firm specializing in both cultural/institutional and private residential projects.

== Early life and education ==
Lee attended Hamilton College in Clinton, New York, majoring in music and art. It was here, that Lee was first introduced to the profession of architecture and decided to pursue it as a career choice. Lee would go on to work on the construction of Arcosanti, a utopian community designed by the Italian architect, Paolo Soleri. In 1975, Skolnick entered the architecture program at the Cooper Union in New York City, where he studied under the Dean of the school, John Hejduk. Lee graduated with honors from the school in 1979. He worked for one year with the architects Elizabeth Diller and Ricardo Scofidio before leaving to start his own firm in September 1980.

Lee Skolnick received a Bachelor of Architecture from the Cooper Union in 1979. He received the 2006 President's Citation and the 2012 recipient of the John Q. Hejduk Prize. Lee Skolnick is also a Fellow and has also been inducted into the College of Fellows of the AIA.

== Career ==
=== Architecture ===
Skolnick leads the firm, SKOLNICK Architecture, along with his business partner Paul Alter and his wife and partner, Jo Ann Secor, for the past 40 years. He is credited for the philosophies of “design as interpretation” and “narrative design” and has advanced these approaches through professional practice, lecturing, teaching and writing. Lee has also served as an instructor at Cooper Union, New York University, Bank Street College of Education and as an Honorary Research Fellow at the University of Leicester in Great Britain. Lee has served on design juries and foundations’ grants committees for the National Endowment for the Arts, New York State Council on the Arts, the Municipal Art Society, New York City’s Department of Cultural Affairs, the local and national AIA. He has sat on various Boards of Trustees and Boards of Directors, including: The Cooper Union, Architecture Omi, The LongHouse Reserve, SEGD, The Village Temple, and others.

In addition to designing museums, schools, libraries, residences, exhibits and a wide range of other architectural projects, Lee has created numerous museum education programs, teaching kits, and curriculum materials for schools in New York and throughout the United States. In bringing New York City’s architectural and cultural heritage to its children, he has conducted symposiums, workshops and provided teacher training for some of New York City's top educational and cultural organizations. SKOLNICK Architecture + Design Partnership designed the exhibition for The Cooper Union’s Great Hall renovation.

== Design projects ==
- Aileron: Center for Entrepreneurial Education, Dayton, OH
- Ani Villas, Little Bay, Anguilla, BWI Hello again!
- Beach House, Sagaponack, New York
- B’nai Yisrael Synagogue, Armonk, NY
- Children’s and Young Adult Reading Rooms at East Hampton Library, East Hampton, New York (RAMSA, Architect; SKOLNICK, Interior Design)
- Children’s Museum of the East End, Bridgehampton, NY
- Creative Discovery Museum, Chattanooga, TN
- DiMenna Children’s History Museum, New-York Historical Society, New York, NY
- Discovery Zone at the Florida Museum of Natural History, Gainesville, FL
- East Hampton Library
- Education Center at the Rubin Museum of Art, New York, NY
- Global Crossing Headquarters, New York, NY
- Jackie & Harold Spielman Children’s Library at Port Washington Public Library, Port Washington, NY
- Luxembourg Science Center (Concept Design), Differdange, Luxembourg
- Miami Children’s Museum, Miami, FL (Arquitectonica, Architect; SKOLNICK, Exhibit Design)
- Mohonk Preserve Visitor Center, Gardiner, NY
- Muhammad Ali Center, Louisville, KY (in partnership with Beyer Blinder Belle)
- Muzeiko – America for Bulgaria Children’s Museum, Sofia, Bulgaria
- NYU Langone Health - Hassenfeld Children's Hospital
- Qualcomm Wireless Technology Center (Concept Design), Beijing, China
- Roper Mountain Science Center Environmental Science and Sustainability Building, Greenville, SC (Design Architect: SKOLNICK; Architect of Record: Craig Gaulden Davis)
- Royal Alberta Museum, Bug Gallery and Children’s Gallery, Edmonton, Alberta, CA
- Sag Harbor Church (The Church), Sag Harbor, NY
- Sony Wonder Technology Lab, New York, NY
- The National Track and Field Hall of Fame, New York, NY

== Awards and honors ==
Since the 1980s, Skolnick has been awarded Architectural Digest “AD100,” Cooper Union’s “John Q. Hejduk Award,” House & Garden's “Design Obsession,” the Presidential Citation for Outstanding Achievement from The Cooper Union, and local, state and national AIA Honor Awards including the “Lifetime Achievement Award” from the Long Island Chapter of the AIA. In 2003, Lee was elevated to the American Institute of Architects College of Fellows. He became an Honorary Research Fellow at the University of Leicester, UK in 2007 and in 2009, he was inducted into Cooper Union Alumni Hall of Fame. In 2022, Skolnick received the Innovator Award from Hamptons Cottages & Gardens Magazine.

== Articles ==
- Architectural Digest (Sept 2020) "Inside a Light-Filled Town House in New York's Historic Greenwich Village"
- Skolnick, Lee H. (July–August 2019). So You Think You Want to Build a New Science Center… Dimensions Magazine. 18-23. Washington, DC, Association of Science and Technology Centers Incorporated.
- Skolnick, Lee H. (April 18, 2019). Lee Skolnick and Robert Stilin Create a Modern Hamptons Escape Galerie Magazine online edition.
- Skolnick, Lee H. (October 2017). The Invasion of the McRanchions The East Hampton Star. East Hampton, NY, Helen S. Rattray.
- Skolnick, Lee H. (July 2016). Superb Geometry Galerie Magazine. 166-183. New York, NY, Hudson Publishing LLC.
- Skolnick, Lee H. and Secor, Jo Ann. (Vol 31. Numbers 2-3, Summer/Fall 2017) One Museum Opens: Three Perspectives: The Children’s Museum as an Urban Revitalization Anchor Hand 2 Hand Quarterly Journal of ACM. 26-27. Arlington, VA, Association of Children's Museums.
- Skolnick, Lee H. (Issue 146, September–October 2017). Architecture and Design as Interpretation Informal Learning Review. 8-13. Denver, CO, Informal Learning Experiences, Inc.
- Skolnick, Lee H. (Vol. 33, No. 1, Spring 2014). Master Class: Design as Interpretation Exhibitionist. 74-78. Washington, DC, American Alliance of Museums (AAM), National Association for Museum Exhibition (NAME).
- Skolnick, Lee H. (No. 3, 2012). Sketchbook: Inside Lee Skolnick’s head for the design of the Muhammad Ali Center Environmental Graphics Magazine. 60-61. Washington, DC, Society for Environmental Graphic Design (SEGD).
- Skolnick, Lee H. (Volume XXI Number 3, Winter 2008/2009) The Re-Greening of Anguilla Part 1 Anguilla Life Magazine. 15. Anguilla, BWI and New York, NY, Claire Devener.
- Skolnick, Lee H. (Volume XXII Number 2, Fall 2009) The Re-Greening of Anguilla Part 2 Anguilla Life Magazine. 16-17. Anguilla, BWI and New York, NY, Claire Devener.
- Skolnick, Lee H. (Volume XXII Number 3, Winter 2009/2010) The Re-Greening of Anguilla Part 3 Anguilla Life Magazine . Anguilla, BWI and New York, NY, Claire Devener.
- Skolnick, Lee H. (Fall 2008). Mo Sex, Less Sex Exhibitionist. 51-58. Washington, DC, American Alliance of Museums (AAM), National Association for Museum Exhibition (NAME).
- Skolnick, Lee H. (1997) The Space Between the Stone Ridgelines. New Paltz, New York, The Mohonk Preserve.

== Books ==
- Skolnick, Lee H. (2020). Skolnick Architecture + Design Partnership: Public/Private (in English) Pointed Leaf Press. ISBN 978-1938461835
- Skolnick, Lee H. (2012). ‘Beyond Narrative: Designing Epiphanies'‘Beyond Narrative: Designing Epiphanies', in Suzanne Macleod, Laura Hourston Hanks, Jonathan Hale (ed.) Museum Making: Narratives, Architectures, Exhibitions (Museum Meanings) Routledge, pp.83–94. ISBN 978-0415676038
- Skolnick, L., Lorenc, J., & Berger, C. (2007) What is Exhibition Design? (in English) Mies, Switzerland: Rotovision. ISBN 978-2940361663
- Skolnick, Lee H. (2005) ‘Towards a New Museum Architecture’, in Suzanne MacLeod (ed.) ‘Reshaping Museum Space (Museum Meanings) Routledge, pp. 118–132. ISBN 978-0415343459
- Skolnick, Lee H. (2000). ‘Creating a Learning Experience’, by Connie Sprague, James Grayson Trulove, and Steel Colony (ed.) This Way: Signage Design for Public Spaces Rockport Publishers, pp. 10–13. ISBN 9781564967527

== See also ==
- Contemporary architecture
- Exhibit design
- Exhibition designer
