= Parachute pants =

Style of nylon trousers

A pair of parachute pants

Parachute pants, originally known as flight pants, are a style of trousers characterized by the use of nylon, especially ripstop nylon.

== History ==
In the original tight-fitting style of the early 1980s, "parachute" referred to the pants' nylon material, similar to a parachute's. Parachute pants became a fad in US culture in the 1980s as part of the increased popularity of breakdancing.

The clothing company Bugle Boy manufactured the pants in the early 1980s, although they were not the first company to manufacture parachute pants. The company Panno D'or states that they invented them, though this claim is not confirmed. However, Bugle Boy was the company that made them immensely popular, seemingly overnight. Bugle Boy parachute pants are identifiable by having the word "Countdown" on a small tag above the rear pocket's zipper.

Teenage boys were the main wearers of parachute pants. They typically cost $25-$30 a pair (US$80-$112 in 2024, accounting inflation). During the height of their popularity, 1984–1985, boys wearing parachute pants were fairly common. Bugle Boy did make pants for girls and women, though they remained most popular with males. They went out of fashion almost as quickly as they arrived, with the fad lasting about two years. Their slim, fitted look was eventually overtaken by much looser, baggy-style pants. Parachute pants played a pivotal role in 1980s fashion.

In 2024, parachute pants and clothing began to fashionably re-emerge, primarily in the celebrity world.

== Functional clothing ==
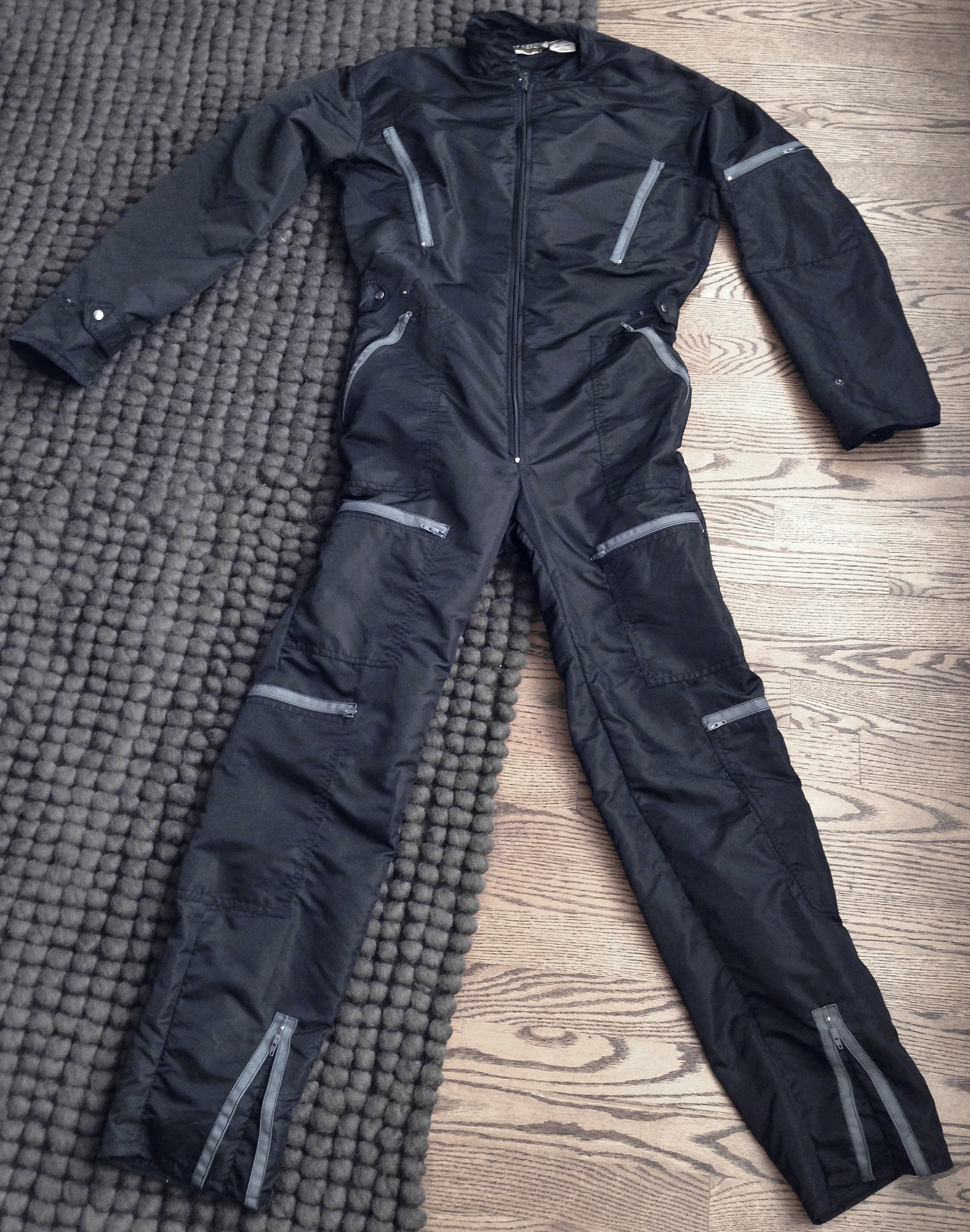
1983 Parachute Pant Jumpsuit Called SR-71

Early breakdancers occasionally used heavy nylon to construct jumpsuits or trousers that would be able to endure contact with the breakdancing surface while at the same time decreasing friction, allowing speedy and intricate "downrock" routines without fear of friction burns or wear in clothing. Some, possibly apocryphal, sources state that genuine parachute nylon was cut and used to make such trousers possible. In the early part of the 1980s, parachute pants were tight fitting. Due to the use of nylon in parachutes, the style of pants became known as parachute pants. Often, early outfits were of a single color or slightly patchwork in nature as they were sometimes made of found materials.

When manufactured and marketed as fashionable clothing, parachute pants were often constructed with lightweight synthetic fabrics, making this variety of pants more suitable for fashion than breakdancing.

== See also ==
- Dance costume
- Harem pants
