= Bugle Boy =

Former American clothing company

Bugle Boy Industries, Inc.
- Formerly: Buckaroo International, Inc. (1977–1980)
- Type: Private
- Industry: Apparel
- Founded: 1977 (49 years ago) (as Buckaroo International, Inc.)
- Founder: William C. W. Mow; Stanley Buchthal
- Defunct: 2001 (25 years ago)
- Fate: Filed for Chapter 11 bankruptcy and liquidated; trademark and wholesale assets sold to Schottenstein Stores Corp.
- Headquarters: Simi Valley, California, U.S.
- Key people: William C. W. Mow (founder, chairman and CEO); Stanley Buchthal (co-founder, first president); Vincent Nesi (president); Rosa Mow (president and COO from 1996)
- Products: Jeans, casual pants, sportswear, apparel and accessories
- Number of employees: ~3,500 (peak)

Bugle Boy Industries, Inc. was an American apparel company best known for its jeans and casual pants—including parachute pants and cargo pants—and for its television advertising during the 1980s and 1990s. The company was founded in 1977 by engineer and entrepreneur William C. W. Mow as Buckaroo International, Inc., and was renamed Bugle Boy Industries in 1980. The company was privately held and grew into one of the largest apparel firms in Southern California, with annual sales of roughly $500 million, before filing for Chapter 11 bankruptcy and being liquidated in 2001. Its trademark and wholesale operations were sold to Schottenstein Stores Corp. for $68.6 million.

== History ==
=== Origins ===
Bugle Boy grew out of Mow's move from electronics into the garment trade. After being forced out of the semiconductor test-equipment company Macrodata, he set up Dragon International in 1976 as an agency importing garments and other goods, and the following year went into the apparel business itself. His finance company introduced him to Stanley "Bucky" Buchthal, an executive at a jeans firm, and in 1977 the two started Buckaroo International, Inc.—its name derived from Buchthal's nickname—with Mow providing the bulk of the roughly $200,000 in capital and Buchthal taking a minority stake and the title of president. Mow financed his share with money from a Taiwanese investor and a bank line secured against his house, and the company lost roughly $250,000 to $300,000 in its first season. Vincent Nesi, a salesman who ran the company's New York operations, joined within months and worked his way up.

In 1980 Mow renamed the company Bugle Boy Industries—a name chosen, in reference to the young buglers of the American Civil War, from options developed by a public-relations firm—and refocused it on moderately priced casual pants. Nesi became president, running the New York sales office, while Mow oversaw finance, manufacturing and operations from Simi Valley, California; Nesi held a 10 percent stake that Mow bought out in the mid-1990s to become sole owner. Buchthal sold his interest in the company in 1983 and left to pursue licensing ventures.

=== Growth ===
Bugle Boy's first major hit was a line of zippered nylon parachute pants that became popular in the early 1980s, with Mow at one point dominating the supply of nylon twill from Taiwan. The craze collapsed in 1984, leaving the company with unsold inventory and a negative net worth of about $5 million; Bugle Boy recovered by bringing out a new line within months, after which the brand caught on with young buyers. Mow then moved into other youth fashions, most notably baggy cargo pants, which drove a four-year boom that peaked in the company's 1990 fiscal year. In 1988 Bugle Boy introduced a widely remembered television commercial—conceived by Mow himself and produced by the advertising agency Rubin Postaer—in which a woman driving a black Ferrari through the desert, played by the Welsh model and actress Annabel Schofield, pulls over to ask a young hitchhiker, "Excuse me, are those Bugle Boy jeans you're wearing?" The tagline helped make the brand a household name.

Annual sales climbed from less than $10 million in the early 1980s—the company lost $750,000 on sales of $4.1 million as late as 1981—to about $189 million in fiscal 1987, $267 million in 1988, and, after a year of deliberately restrained growth, roughly $480 to $500 million by the 1990 fiscal year, when the company earned about $44 million in profit. The company grew at an average rate of about 90 percent a year during the 1980s, and by 1990 it outsold Levi's in the boys' and young men's categories. Drawing on his engineering background, Mow invested early in computerized design, inventory and distribution systems and in electronic data interchange with retailers; the company's clothing was sourced from suppliers in some 18 countries, and it sold through about 8,000 stores nationwide.

When the cargo-pants trend faded after 1990, sales began to slide and Bugle Boy came close to failing; Mow later acknowledged, "We could have gone out of business, we really could have." Beginning in the early 1990s he restructured the company from a supplier of trendy pants for young men into a full-line apparel maker for males of all ages, adding men's, boys' and children's divisions, and it also introduced women's lines. Gross sales were about $440 million for the fiscal year ended April 30, 1994. In December 1994 Nesi, who had been president since 1981, was named vice chairman of merchandising to concentrate on building the women's-wear business, and Mow added the title of president; Rosa Mow, William Mow's wife, was promoted to president and chief operating officer in January 1996. Mow, who owned about 90 percent of the company—Nesi held the remaining 10 percent—considered taking Bugle Boy public around 1994 to raise capital and challenge Levi's, but kept it private. Nesi resigned in 1995, ending an 18-year partnership, and Mow bought out his stake to become sole owner. Sales settled around $500 million through the 1990s, reaching about $520 million in 1998, and Mow's stated goal of $1 billion was never met.

By the late 1990s the company had repositioned its image around a wholesome "Classic" red-white-and-blue line aimed at value-conscious families, replacing the earlier campaigns built around glamorous models, and it increasingly sold through discount and mid-priced chains such as Mervyn's, Walmart and Sears. It also expanded its own chain of retail and outlet stores, which by the early 1990s added about $100 million in annual sales and which peaked at more than 300 locations by 2000; by the late 1990s those outlets generated roughly half of the company's revenue. Reflecting Mow's interest in technology, the company spent about $17 million in 1997 on new computer systems and a distribution warehouse in Atlanta, and by 2000 its roughly 310 stores used a system that combined point-of-sale data with people-counting devices to schedule staff according to hourly customer traffic.

=== Licensing ===
As the brand matured, Bugle Boy extended its name through licensing into categories it did not manufacture itself; under licensing chief Howard Finelt the program's revenue grew from about $2 million to roughly $50 million in the late 1990s. In 1996 the company licensed Van Mar Inc. to produce a "Bugle Boy For Her" line of women's innerwear. In 1997, anticipating the spread of mandatory school-uniform policies, it licensed the children's-wear maker Lollytogs Ltd. to produce Bugle Boy–branded school uniforms, which were sold through chains such as Mervyn's, Sears and Kids "R" Us. Beginning in 2000 it licensed the New York junior manufacturer One Clothing to make girls' and juniors' lines, including one marketed as "B 'Heart' B by Bugle Boy." By 2001 women's wear accounted for about 10 percent of the company's wholesale volume and as much as 20 percent of sales in its own stores.

=== Manufacturing and China ===
From its early years Bugle Boy sourced its clothing overseas, eventually drawing on suppliers in roughly 18 countries and assigning the simplest garments to the least-developed producers while routing more complex work to more sophisticated factories, so that disruptions in one country could be shifted elsewhere. As rising U.S. import-quota costs made Taiwanese production less competitive, the company moved its Asian headquarters to Hong Kong and shifted most manufacturing to mainland China, while in the mid-1990s it also took advantage of the North American Free Trade Agreement to produce some clothing in North America. In 1996 Mow relocated the Asian headquarters across the border into the Shenzhen special economic zone, leasing a 40,000-square-foot facility with a sample factory, fabric warehouse and offices; the move was projected to save about $7 million a year, and the company planned to cut its Hong Kong staff from a peak of about 350 to roughly 30. Mow set a goal of opening as many as 1,000 Bugle Boy stores in China over the following decade and began selling the brand in Hong Kong, though he acknowledged the venture's risks and chose to expand cautiously. In March 1999 Bugle Boy was among eight clothing manufacturers and retailers that settled U.S. Federal Trade Commission charges of failing to disclose the country of origin of textile products sold through online catalogs, agreeing to a consent order without admitting any violation.

=== Decline ===
Industry analysts and former executives later attributed Bugle Boy's decline to a mix of strategic and market factors. As department stores increasingly favored their own private-label goods, the company pushed more of its merchandise through discount and off-price chains; observers said this flooding of discounters eroded the brand's margins and undercut its standing with department stores, several of which—including Federated Department Stores—dropped the line by the mid-1990s. To keep its goods moving, Bugle Boy opened a large chain of its own retail and outlet stores, but industry veterans argued that such a strategy works only for brands that retain a strong presence in mainstream retail, and Mow's 1995 decision to open scores of stores in lower-end malls put the company in direct competition with the department stores that had supported it.

Former managers also pointed to Mow's centralization of control. After forcing out president Vincent Nesi in 1995 and installing his wife, Rosa, in senior leadership, and later bringing his daughter in to oversee marketing—displacing the executives associated with the brand's well-known advertising—Mow concentrated decision-making in himself; former retail-division president Joseph Shannon and former licensing chief Howard Finelt said his reluctance to delegate or take advice damaged the company. Analysts placed the troubles in a broader context as well, citing the 1990 recession, consolidation among retailers, intense competition, and the squeeze on so-called third-tier apparel makers caught between retailers' in-house labels and stronger national brands. By the late 1990s the once-dominant label was widely seen as having drifted downmarket and was described by one industry figure as a tired, bargain-basement brand. Sales slipped to about $423 million in the company's final full year, and a work force that had numbered around 3,500 at its peak fell to roughly 450 at the Simi Valley headquarters by 1999 and to fewer than 100 by early 2001 as suppliers went unpaid and the company's cash position deteriorated.

=== Bankruptcy and sale ===
Bugle Boy filed for Chapter 11 bankruptcy protection on February 1, 2001, carrying more than $100 million in debt—about $75 million owed to a secured-lender syndicate led by Foothill Capital Corp. and General Electric Credit Corp., plus roughly $30 million to unsecured creditors. Mow resigned the week before the filing, and an interim chief executive was installed to oversee what became a full liquidation; the company was renamed Bluegrass Liquidating Corp. At the time of the filing the company had agreed to sell most of its wholesale operations to Perry Ellis International, which had signed a letter of intent for the brand, while liquidating its remaining assets, including about 150 retail and outlet stores.

In March 2001, three companies competed through 22 rounds of bidding for the Bugle Boy trademark and other assets. Perry Ellis opened the bidding at about $44 million, and Tropical Sportswear International offered $52 million for the trademark alone, before Schottenstein Stores Corp. won with a bid of $68.6 million for the trademark, accounts receivable and wholesale inventory. The company's retail and outlet stores were liquidated separately.

=== Aftermath ===
Schottenstein, a Columbus, Ohio, company known for acquiring distressed brands, hired a New York brand-management firm to reposition Bugle Boy, dropping the women's line and refocusing on young men, with a relaunch planned for spring 2002. Under its new owner the label was sold mainly through moderate and discount chains such as Kohl's, J. C. Penney and Mervyn's. The trademark has since been held by a Schottenstein affiliate, Official Bugle Boy, LLC, and the brand has been largely dormant. Vincent Nesi went on to found the Nesi Apparel Group, which developed fashion licensing partnerships with hip-hop labels including Shady Ltd. and Rocawear before he took on the apparel license for the Winchester brand in 2012.

== Products ==
Bugle Boy chiefly produced men's and boys' clothing, often with a denim theme, and was best known for its jeans, jean shorts, parachute pants and cargo pants. Elastic cuffs and distinctive stitching were characteristic of the brand's styling.
