= New York City Department of Design and Construction =

New York City government agency

Department of Design and Construction
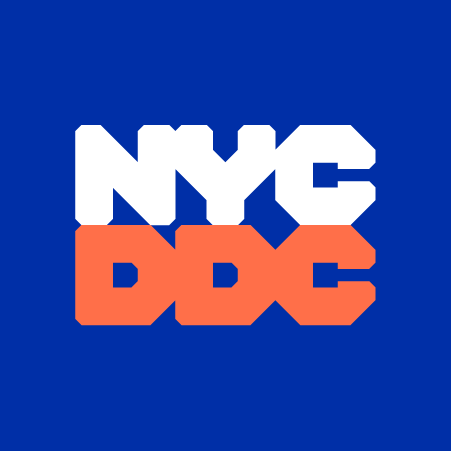
- The official logo of the New York City Department of Design and Construction

Department overview
- Formed: 1996
- Jurisdiction: New York City
- Headquarters: 30-30 Thomson Avenue Long Island City, NY 11101
- Employees: 1,207 (FY 2026)
- Annual budget: $179.7 million (FY 2026)
- Department executive: Paul A. Ochoa, Commissioner of Design and Construction
- Key document: New York City Charter
- Website: www.nyc.gov/ddc

New York City Department of Design and Construction is the department of the government of New York City that builds many of the civic facilities in New York City. As the city’s primary capital construction project manager, it provides new or renovated facilities such as firehouses, libraries, police precincts, courthouses and manage the city's sewer systems, bioswales and water mains. To manage this portfolio, valued at over $15 billion, the department works with other city agencies, as well as with architects and consultants.

The Department of Design and Construction staff of almost 1,400 delivers public buildings and infrastructure construction projects in all five boroughs.

== History ==
Formed in 1996 by New York City Mayor Rudy Giuliani, the Department of Design and Construction's function was to unify the Department of Transportation's street construction program, the Department of Environmental Protection's water main and sewer construction program and the Department of General Service's vast building program, including construction of Police, Fire and Sanitation buildings, correctional facilities, libraries, cultural institutions and other municipal structures.

Since being founded, the department has completed over 4,100 infrastructure and public building projects. Notable work includes the reconstructions of Columbus Circle and Times Square Plaza, restoration of the Bronx-Manhattan High Bridge, construction of the visitor center at MoMA PS1, construction of the Queens Botanical Garden - New York City's first civic Leadership in Energy and Environmental Design facility, renovations at the Queens Museum, and restorations at New York City Hall.
