= Meisha Ross Porter =

Current Chancellor of NYC Department of Education

Chancellor of the New York City Department of Education
- In office March 15, 2021 – December 31, 2021
- Appointed by: Bill de Blasio
- Preceded by: Richard Carranza
- Succeeded by: David Banks

Executive Superintendent of New York City Public Schools for the Bronx
- In office 2018 – March 15, 2021
- Chancellor: Richard Carranza

Personal details
- Born: November 18, 1973 (age 52)
- Citizenship: United States
- Spouse: Norris Porter
- Children: 3
- Education: Queens Technical High School
- Alma mater: Hunter College; Mercy University; Fordham University

Meisha Ross Porter (/ˈmiːʃə/ MEE-shə; born November 18, 1973) is an American educator who served as the 30th New York City Schools Chancellor in 2021.

== Biography ==
Meisha Ross Porter was born in Far Rockaway and raised in Jamaica, Queens. She graduated from Queens Vocational and Technical High School before enrolling in Hunter College. Porter received her Bachelor of Arts degree in English, concentrating in Cross Cultural Literature and Black and Puerto Rican Studies.

She started her career as a youth organizer in the Bronx. She was involved with the foundation of the Bronx School for Law, Government and Justice (BLGJ). She worked at BLGJ for a total of 18 years, variously as a community associate, a teacher, an assistant principal, and ultimately as the principal.

Ross Porter was appointed Superintendent of District 11 in 2015, where she served for less than three years. District 11 includes neighborhoods that span the Northeast Bronx. In 2018, she was appointed Bronx Executive Superintendent, overseeing 361 schools with 235,000 students in that borough.

New York City Mayor Bill de Blasio announced that Porter was his pick for schools chancellor on February 26, 2021. The then chancellor, Richard Carranza, was stepping down. Porter is New York City's first Black woman chancellor.

Ross Porter has continued her education through her career. She received her master's degree in Administration and Supervision from Mercy University and completed her School District Leader certification through the NYC Advanced Leadership Institute (Center for Integrated Teacher Education - CITE). She is currently pursuing a doctorate in education at Fordham University.

A recipient of the National Association of Negro Women's Sojourner Truth Award, Porter has been a Columbia University Cahn fellow and an Aspen Institute fellow. She has taught at CUNY as an adjunct professor and participated in the Harvard University National Institute for Urban School Leaders and is a member of the Fordham University – Carnegie Foundation iLead team.

Educational offices
Preceded by Richard Carranza	Chancellor of the New York City Department of Education; 2021–2021	Succeeded by David C. Banks
