= Melissa Aviles-Ramos =

American educator and schools administrator

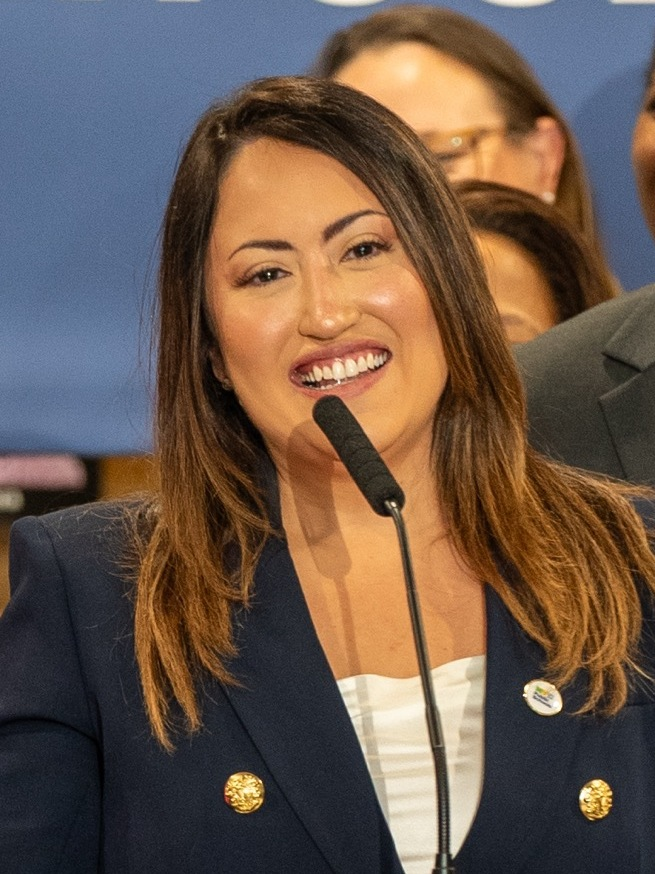

Chancellor of the New York City Department of Education
- In office October 16, 2024 – December 31, 2025
- Mayor: Eric Adams
- Preceded by: David Banks
- Succeeded by: Kamar Samuels

Deputy Chancellor of Family and Community Engagement and External Affairs of the New York City Department of Education
- In office July 8, 2024 – October 16, 2024
- Chancellor: David Banks
- Succeeded by: Vacant

Personal details
- Born: Melissa Aviles
- Education: Fordham University (BA); City College of New York (MA)

Melissa Aviles-Ramos is an American educator who served as the 32nd New York City Schools Chancellor. She previously served as Deputy Chancellor for family and community engagement and external affairs at the NYC DOE, and replaced David C. Banks following his resignation. She was replaced with Kamar Samuels, who currently serves the role under Zohran Mamdani.

== Career ==
Aviles-Ramos joined New York City Public Schools in 2007 as an English teacher at Truman High School. After teaching at Truman High School, Ramos was hired as the principal at Schuylerville Preparatory High School. At Schuylerville Prep, Aviles-Ramos increased the graduation rate from 23 percent to 68 percent in her first year, and from 68 percent to 83 percent in her second year. Over her career in education, Aviles-Ramos has served in many roles including assistant principal, principal, deputy superintendent, acting superintendent, and education administrator.

In September 2024, the NYC Mayor's office announced that Aviles-Ramos would replace David C. Banks as DOE Chancellor. On October 2, the mayoral office announced that the date for Aviles-Ramos to replace Banks was moved up from January 1, 2025 to October 16, 2024. Explaining the move, mayoral spokesperson Amaris Cockfield wrote in a statement: "students are best served by having the same leadership through as much of the school year as possible, rather than changing chancellors halfway through.”

After serving as schools chancellor, Aviles-Ramos became an executive in residence at Houghton Mifflin Harcourt.

Educational offices
Preceded by David C. Banks	Chancellor of the New York City Department of Education; 2024–Present	Incumbent
