= Dennis Walcott =

American politician

Dennis M. Walcott
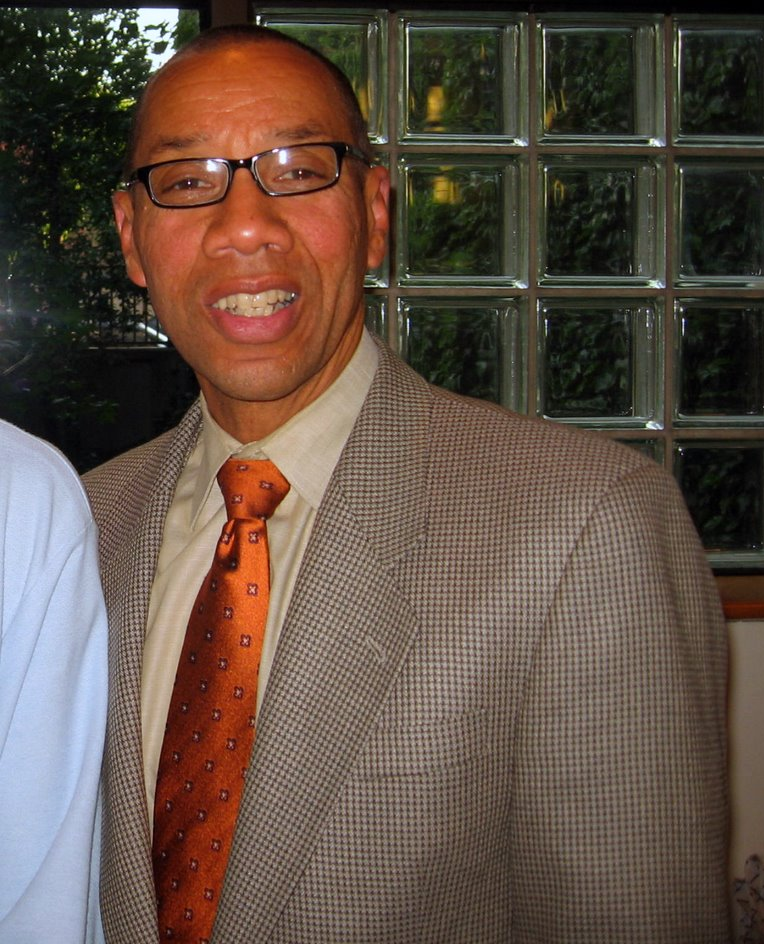

Chair of the New York City Districting Commission
- In office March 7, 2022 – December 31, 2022
- Appointed by: Eric Adams

Chancellor of the New York City Department of Education
- In office April 17, 2011 – December 31, 2013
- Mayor: Michael Bloomberg
- Preceded by: Cathie Black
- Succeeded by: Carmen Fariña

Deputy Mayor of New York City for Education
- In office January 1, 2002 – April 17, 2011
- Mayor: Michael Bloomberg
- Preceded by: position created
- Succeeded by: position abolished

Personal details
- Born: September 7, 1951 (age 75) Queens, New York
- Spouse: Denise St. Hill
- Education: University of Bridgeport (B.Ed., M.Ed.); Fordham University (MSW)

Dennis M. Walcott (born September 7, 1951) is the former Chancellor of the New York City Department of Education. He succeeded Cathie Black, who resigned in April 2011 after only three months on the job. He was succeeded as chancellor by Carmen Fariña. He is the president and chief executive officer of Queens Public Library.

Although Walcott lacks training as a schools administrator, he served nine years as New York City Deputy Mayor for Education and was a member of the NYC Board of Education. He required a waiver from the New York State Education Department under Education Commissioner David M. Steiner. Walcott is a former employee at Amistad Day Care Center and holds a master's degree in the education field.

Prior to joining Mayor Michael Bloomberg in 2002 as Deputy Mayor for Education, he headed the New York chapter of the Urban League. In March 2016, Walcott was selected as president and CEO of the Queens Public Library and was criticized for overseeing the Library's first branch closure despite increased funding.

== Early life and education ==
Walcott is the son of immigrants from Barbados and St. Croix. He is a native of Queens, New York. He attended Francis Lewis High School, and he earned a bachelor's degree in 1973 and a master's degree in 1974 from the University of Bridgeport in Connecticut. He earned a Master's in Social Work from Fordham University in 1980.

Walcott's early employment was in counseling. In 1974, he began a one and a half year tenure at the privately run pre-kindergarten Amistad Child Care and Family Center in South Jamaica, Queens.

== Public service work ==
In 1975, Walcott founded the Frederick Douglass Brother-to-Brother mentoring program. He went on to become president and chief executive of the New York Urban League for 12 years, where he expanded educational and youth service programs. He also served as executive director of the Harlem Dowling Westside Center, expanding services to children and families in need. In 1993 Mayor David Dinkins appointed him to the predecessor agency to the Department of Education, the New York City Board of Education. His term extended into the mayoral term of mayor Rudy Giuliani. He also taught as an adjunct professor of Social Work at York College, and was a talk show radio host on community issues.

Under Walcott's direct leadership, after 30 years, the Queens Public Library closed their first Library branch ever in Court Square in Long Island City despite increased funding for Libraries by the city, the area's population growth and multiple efforts by community members to ensure continuous library service. Local Councilman Jimmy Van Bramer condemned Dennis Walcott for his inability to prevent the closure despite years of notice in advance of the situation.

== East Ramapo oversight ==
Walcott was assigned to review the budgetary and academic failures in the East Ramapo Central School District, which is mostly made up of Orthodox Jews. He angered some in the community in December 2015 when he recommended that the state assign a committee with veto power to oversee the school board, and that boys and girls use the same bus services, something not permitted by the community's rabbis.

== Personal life ==
Walcott and his wife Denise have four children and eight grandchildren, who have attended New York City Public Schools.

Educational offices
Preceded by Cathie Black	New York City; Schools Chancellor; April 17, 2011-December 31, 2013	Succeeded by Carmen Fariña
