= Sheena Wright =

American nonprofit executive and civil servant (born 1970)

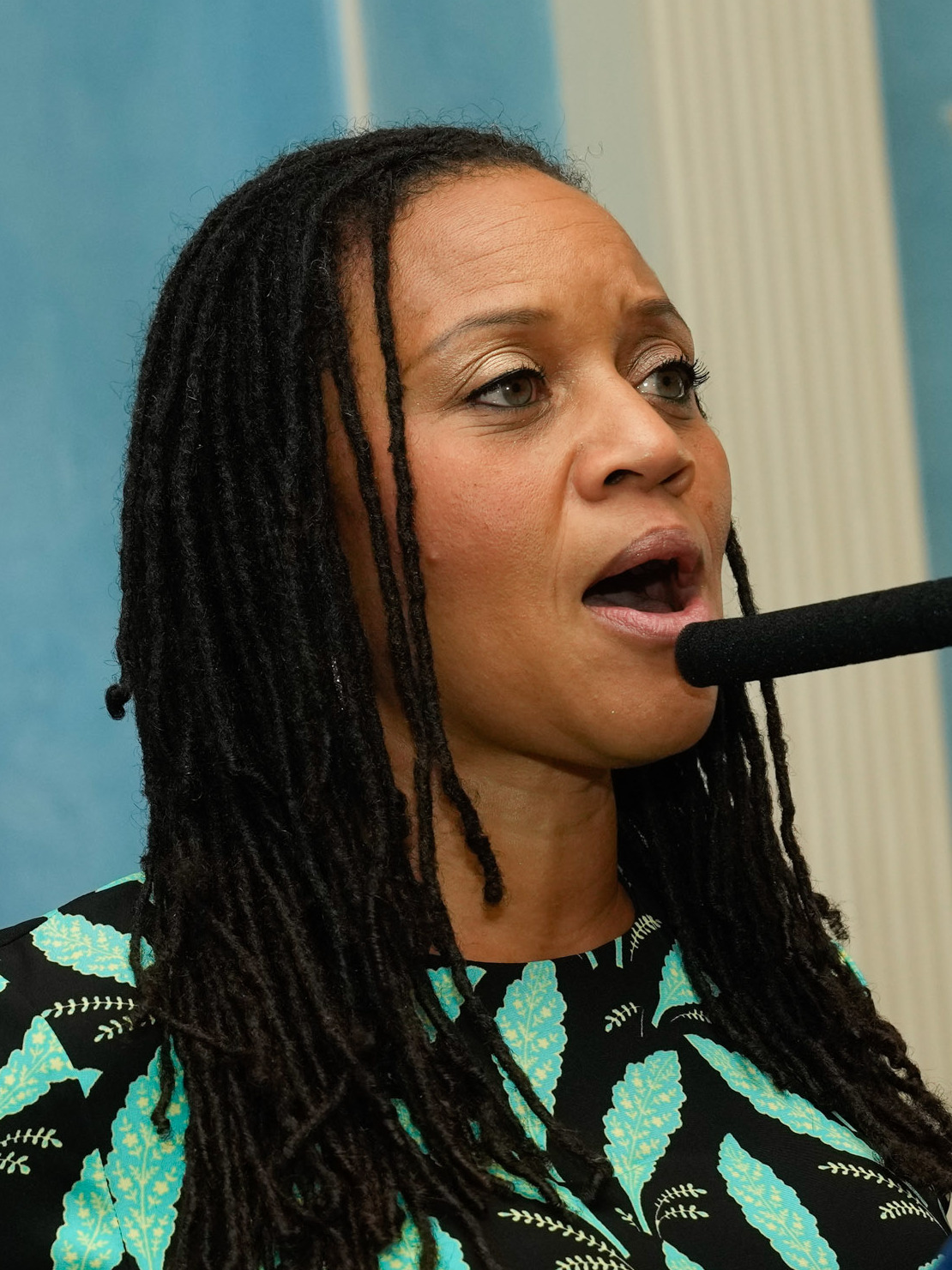
- Wright in 2023

First Deputy Mayor of New York City
- In office January 1, 2023 – October 8, 2024
- Mayor: Eric Adams
- Preceded by: Lorraine Grillo
- Succeeded by: Anne Williams-Isom (acting); Maria Torres-Springer

Deputy Mayor of New York City for Strategic Initiatives
- In office January 1, 2022 – December 31, 2022
- Mayor: Eric Adams
- Succeeded by: Ana Almanzar

Personal details
- Born: January 6, 1970 (age 55) South Bronx, New York City, U.S.
- Spouses: Gregg Walker (divorced) David C. Banks (m. 2024)
- Relatives: Tanya Wright (sister); Philip Banks III (brother-in-law); Terence Banks (brother-in-law)
- Education: Columbia University (BA, JD)

Sheena Wright (born January 6, 1970) is an American nonprofit executive and civil servant. She was the First Deputy Mayor of New York City and was previously the president of the United Way of New York City. In August 2021, she was appointed chair of New York City mayor-elect Eric Adams's transition team. On December 6, 2022, Adams named her Deputy Mayor for Strategic Initiatives, a role she assumed in January 2023. Wright later resigned amid investigations into the Eric Adams administration.

== Early life and education ==
Wright was born and raised in the South Bronx, the daughter of Debra Fraser-Howze, an AIDS activist who founded of the National Black Leadership Commission on AIDS and the daughter of immigrants from Jamaica. She also established Choose Healthy Life, a network of churches dedicated to providing coronavirus testing and administering vaccines. Wright’s sister, Tanya Wright, is an actress.

Wright attended the George School in Pennsylvania before enrolling at Columbia University, where she was a member of the varsity track and field team. She graduated from Columbia College in 1990 and later earned her Juris Doctor degree from Columbia Law School in 1994.

== Career ==
After graduating from law school, Wright worked as a lawyer at Wachtell, Lipton, Rosen & Katz. She also worked in private equity firms and served as general counsel for Crave Technologies, a minority-owned software startup.

Wright served as the president and executive director of the Abyssinian Development Corporation, the economic arm of the influential Abyssinian Baptist Church in Harlem. On April 1, 2013, she was subpoenaed by federal prosecutors regarding her tenure at Abyssinian, specifically concerning the sale of a townhouse—intended for buyers earning less than $130,000—to Todd Hunter, the son of NBA union executive Billy Hunter, through an Abyssinian subsidiary.

Wright's leadership at Abyssinian has faced criticism from former employees, who alleged that over $500,000 was spent on team-building and leadership events, including trips described as "junkets or vacations for favored senior staff" to destinations such as Martha's Vineyard, the Bahamas, and Jamaica.

In 2012, Wright became the first female president and CEO of the United Way of New York City in the organization’s 79-year history. During her tenure, she was actively involved in Hurricane Sandy and COVID-19 relief efforts. She also led the ReadNYC initiative, aimed at improving child literacy.

In August 2021, Eric Adams appointed Wright to lead his mayoral transition team.

She served as the First Deputy Mayor of New York City but resigned amid investigations into the Eric Adams administration.

== Personal life ==
On January 5, 2013, Gregg Walker, Wright's former husband and an executive at Sony at the time, called Harlem's 30th Precinct to report that Wright had assaulted him. Both Wright and Walker were arrested; however, Wright's charges were dropped the same night, while Walker's charges were not dropped for several weeks.

During Wright's detention, her family reportedly contacted influential New Yorkers, including Reverend Calvin O. Butts, who reached out to Phillip Banks III, then NYPD Chief (later resigned while under investigation), and his brother, David C. Banks, who is now Wright’s husband. All three served in the Adams administration.

Walker’s mother alleged that Wright slapped her, scratched her arm, and pushed her. Phillip Banks III admitted to contacting the 30th Precinct about Wright's arrest after being approached by his brother, David C. Banks, who was Wright's partner at the time.

She previously served as a trustee of her alma mater, a position to which she was elected in March 2021.

Wright's husband, David C. Banks, served as the New York City Schools Chancellor from January 2022 to October 2024 in the Adams administration. Banks and Wright married in September 2024.
