= Richard A. Carranza =

Former Chancellor of New York City Department of Education

Chancellor of the New York City Department of Education
- In office April 2, 2018 – March 15, 2021
- Appointed by: Bill de Blasio
- Preceded by: Carmen Fariña
- Succeeded by: Meisha Ross Porter

Superintendent of the Houston Independent School District
- In office August 18, 2016 – April 1, 2018
- Preceded by: Terry Grier
- Succeeded by: Grenita Latham (interim)

Superintendent of the San Francisco Unified School District
- In office 2012–2016
- Preceded by: Carlos A. Garcia
- Succeeded by: Myong Leigh (interim)

Personal details
- Born: December 5, 1966 (age 59) Tucson, Arizona, U.S.
- Children: 2
- Education: University of Arizona (BA); Northern Arizona University (MEd)

Richard A. Carranza (born 1966) is an American educator who was the Chancellor of the New York City Department of Education from 2018 to 2021. He was appointed by Mayor de Blasio after Alberto M. Carvalho publicly turned down the job in March 2018. He previously was the superintendent of the Houston Independent and the San Francisco Unified School Districts. He is Chief of Strategy and Global Development at IXL.

== Early life and education ==
Carranza was born and raised in Tucson, Arizona, the son of Mexican day immigrants. His father worked as a sheet metal worker and his mother was a hairdresser. He graduated from Pueblo High School in 1984.

He earned a Bachelor of Arts degree in secondary education from the University of Arizona and a Master of Education with distinction in educational leadership from Northern Arizona University. He completed doctoral coursework in educational leadership through Northern Arizona University and Nova Southeastern University in Davie, Florida.

== Career ==
He began his career as a high school bilingual social studies and mariachi music teacher, and then as a principal, both in Tucson, Arizona.

Carranza was the Northwest Region superintendent for the Clark County School District in Las Vegas from 2007 to 2009. He worked for the San Francisco Unified School District, first as deputy superintendent and then as superintendent, where he was accused in 2015 of creating a hostile environment for women.

=== Houston Independent School District ===
He was the superintendent of the Houston Independent School District (HISD) beginning in fall 2016. Carranza, who had signed a contract to for three years, remained in this capacity until April 2018, when he was hired as New York City Schools Chancellor with a $345,000 salary. He announced his acceptance of the new job in March of that year. Observers in the Houston area were not aware that Carranza was seeking to exit his position with HISD: He publicly stated that he and the board members of HISD did not have problems with one another.

Doris Delaney, a monitor of HISD appointed by the Texas Education Agency (TEA), wrote a report stating that the former superintendent in fact disliked and felt frustration in reaction to actions taken by HISD board members. The report stated that Carranza disliked how the board was unable to deliberate important issues, overstepped its authority, and included members with inappropriate political desires.

=== New York City ===
In 2018, the de Blasio administration initiated a plan to eliminate New York City's specialized high school exam, which is available to all middle school students in the city. In June 2018, defending the plan, Carranza stated that "I just don't buy into the narrative that any one ethnic group owns admission to these schools." Asian-American groups decried this as anti-Asian racism, considering that a disproportionately large number of students admitted to the city's eight specialized schools are of Asian descent. They believe their children are being targeted for their success on the exam. Alumni, activists and Asian American groups argued that Chancellor Carranza failed to appreciate the socio-economic and other diversity among these students and internal to communities of Asian descent. Carranza refused to apologize for the remarks.

In June 2019 nine members of the New York City Council wrote a letter to Mayor Bill de Blasio asking him to dismiss Carranza, accusing him of having divisive actions. In response, twenty-three Council members, including the education committee chair, sent a letter to the mayor in support of Carranza.

In May 2020, it was reported that under Carranza, the Department of Education downplayed the coronavirus threat as it was closing schools. Students presumed sick from the virus were left unrecorded, and teachers and parents were deprived of information by supervisors on students and staff who were presumed sick. The teachers union contends that the DOE was not complying with state protocols. As of May 11, 74 NYC Department of Education employees had died due to COVID-19.

Carranza resigned as Chancellor of New York City Schools, on March 15, 2021. The abrupt move came after disagreements between Mayor Bill de Blasio and Mr. Carranza over school desegregation policy reached a breaking point. He was replaced by Meisha Porter, a longtime city educator, then the Bronx executive superintendent, who is the first Black woman to lead the sprawling system, which has over 1 million students and 1,800 schools.

During the COVID-19 pandemic, Carranza argued that parents should opt school children out of standardized testing, saying "We do not want to impose additional trauma on students that have already been traumatized."

Educational offices
Preceded by Carmen Fariña	Chancellor of the New York City Department of Education; 2018–2021	Succeeded by Meisha Ross Porter
Preceded by Terry Grier	Superintendent of the Houston Independent School District; 2016–2018	Succeeded by Grenita Latham (interim)
Preceded by Carlos A. Garcia	Superintendent of the San Francisco Unified School District; 2012–2016	Succeeded by Myong Leigh (interim)
