= Nathan Quinones =

American educator and administrator

Nathan Quinones (October 12, 1930 – July 25, 2010; pronounced key-NYO-nas) was an American educator and administrator who served as the New York City School Chancellor from 1984 to 1987, where he led efforts to improve educational standards and cut the system's dropout rate.

== Early life ==
Quinones was born on October 12, 1930, in East Harlem and attended the High School of Commerce. He decided to attend college "by chance", as he had never received any formal college guidance and had applied to City College of New York solely because friends of his were applying there. He graduated from City College in 1953 having majored in classical and romance languages while working six nights a week at a hospital. He served in the United States Army in South Korea after graduating from college. While in the Army, Quinones was given the responsibility of helping his fellow soldiers earn their GED, an experience that led him to pursue the field of education. After completing his military service, he attended Columbia University, where he earned a master's degree in Hispanic literature in 1965 and a Master of Education degree in 1967 at Hunter College.

In 1955, he got a job with the New York City Department of Welfare as a caseworker, where he lasted 18 months. He was hired by the New York City Public Schools in 1957, where he was initially assigned to teach Spanish language at Thomas Jefferson High School. Quinones worked his way up to head the foreign languages department at Benjamin N. Cardozo High School and was named principal of South Bronx High School in 1977. Incoming School Chancellor Frank J. Macchiarola dismissed Samuel Polatnick as Executive Director of High Schools and named Quinones to the $43,000 a year position as Polatnick's replacement, naming him to the position without having advertised the post and bypassing principals with far more experience than Quinones had.

== New York City Schools Chancellor ==
After Anthony J. Alvarado resigned as School Chancellor in May 1984 in the wake of professional misconduct charges, Quinones was selected as Chancellor, having served in the position on an interim basis after Alvarado placed himself on leave two months earlier. While Quinones had been relegated to a minor role under Alvarado, once Quinones became acting Chancellor he removed several administrators tied to Alvarado and restored the structure of high school administration that Alvarado had eliminated. Quinones set higher standards for math and reading, and established an all-day kindergarten program, while undoing efforts Alvarado had made at developing high schools with special themes. Test scores rose and overcrowding was addressed during his tenure, and oversaw the creation of the Harvey Milk High School, which was designed to be a safe space for students regardless of sexual orientation.

He was criticized for his management of the district and its finances, with mayoral candidate Carol Bellamy saying that he "consistently failed to provide the leadership or sound management we need". Pressured to resign as Chancellor in 1987, six months before his contract expired, Mayor Ed Koch called Quinones "a first-rate chancellor" and regretted "that others were not supportive of him" saying that Quinones' "sedate kind of style" had hurt him from a political standpoint. Quinones expressed tremendous relief that he no longer had the burden of leading the school system, saying "I felt like a little bird" singing to himself as he walked down the street.

== Death ==
Quinones died at age 79 on July 25, 2010, in Manhasset, New York from a stroke. He was survived by his wife, the former Romana Martinez, three daughters and three grandchildren.

Academic offices
Preceded by Anthony J. Alvarado	Schools Chancellor of New York City; 1984–1987	Succeeded by Dr. Charles Schonhaut (acting chancellor)
