= Cathie Black =

American school chancellor

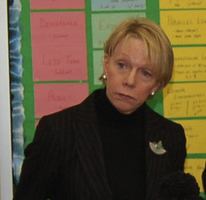
- Black in 2010

Chancellor of the New York City Department of Education
- In office January 1, 2011 – April 7, 2011
- Appointed by: Michael Bloomberg
- Preceded by: Joel Klein
- Succeeded by: Dennis Walcott

Personal details
- Born: Cathleen Prunty Black; April 26, 1944 (age 82) Chicago, Illinois
- Education: Trinity Washington University (B.A.)

Cathleen Prunty "Cathie" Black (born April 26, 1944) is a former New York City Schools Chancellor. On April 7, 2011, Black stepped down from her position after 95 days on the job. Her appointment to replace longtime Chancellor Joel Klein was announced on November 9, 2010 by Mayor Michael Bloomberg and became effective on January 3, 2011. Black required a waiver to replace Klein, as she did not possess the education administration experience required by New York State's Education Department. She was replaced by New York City Deputy Mayor Dennis Walcott.

Black was previously chair of Hearst Magazines, a division of Hearst Corporation, where she was also president for 15 years. Hearst Magazines publishes 20 titles in the U.S., including Harper's Bazaar, Cosmopolitan, Esquire, ELLE and O, The Oprah Magazine, and more than 300 editions around the world. She is also the author of BASIC BLACK and is a former president and publisher of USA Today.

== Early life and education ==
Black was born in Chicago, Illinois on April 26, 1944, to James Hamilton and Margaret (née Harrington) Black. She holds a degree from Trinity College (class of 1966) in Washington, DC, and 10 honorary degrees from: St. Mary's College, South Bend, Ind.; Capitol College, Laurel, Md.; Ithaca College, Ithaca, N.Y.; Lehigh University, Bethlehem, Pa.; Simmons College, Boston, Mass.; Trinity Washington University, Washington, D.C.; Trinity College, Hartford, Conn.; Marymount College, Tarrytown, N.Y.; Loyola University, New Orleans, La. and Hamilton College in Clinton, NY.

== Business career ==
Black began her career at Holiday Magazine, went on to work at New York Magazine, City magazine, Ms. Magazine and eventually return to New York Magazine as publisher, the first woman publisher of a weekly consumer magazine.

She later worked for USA Today starting in 1983, the year after it was launched. She served as both president and publisher of USA Today, spending eight years at the newspaper. Black was also a board member and executive vice president/marketing of Gannett, its parent company.

As President and CEO of the Newspaper Association of America from 1991 to 1996, Black, along with newspaper industry leaders on the NAA Board, conceived of the idea of a national newspaper network to stimulate demand from major national advertisers. Black oversaw Newspaper National Network's founding, raised funding, and hired the first management team.

Black became president of Hearst Magazines in 1996. She was president of Hearst Magazines until 2010, when she became chairman. During her tenure at Hearst Magazines, the company expanded to publish 200 editions around the globe, launched O, The Oprah Magazine and Food Network Magazine, formed COMAG MARKETING GROUP (CMG) with Condé Nast and acquired the assets of Gruner+Jahr U.K., Seventeen, Veranda magazine and iCrossing, a digital marketing agency.

She has been a member of the board of directors of IBM and The Coca-Cola Company, Hearst Corporation, Advertising Council, United Way of America and Gannett Co. Inc. She is a member of the Council on Foreign Relations

She is also on the National Leadership Board of Harlem Village Academies and a Trustee of the University of Notre Dame.

In Black's nearly 20 years on the Coke board and on "a company committee that focused on policy issues including obesity and selling soda to children," Bloomberg and others opposed the company and other manufacturers' sales efforts in schools. Black resigned her position on the Coke board after the NYC nomination, citing potential conflicts of interest. She was paid over $2 million in cash and stock over her tenure on the board, and still owns over $3 million worth of company stock. The mayor reiterated both the school policy against soda sales and his support for Black when the subject was raised after the nomination. Donald McHenry, "a longtime Coke board member and a professor at Georgetown University who sat on the committee" with Black, confirmed that the issue had faced the board continuously but did not address Black's position or individual role in the internal company debates, decisions and actions.

== Schools chancellor ==
As chancellor, Black was head of the New York City Department of Education, the largest public school system in the United States, which serves more than 1.1 million students in more than 1,600 schools. She resigned, after much controversy, on April 7, 2011.

=== Controversy ===
Having neither three years of teaching experience nor a master's degree nor a professional degree in educational management, Black required a waiver from the New York State Education Department under Education Commissioner David M. Steiner. The waiver was granted by Steiner, with Black's shortfall in formal qualifications "offset by the appointment of a chief academic officer to serve by her side [as well as her] 'exceptional record of successfully leading complex organizations and achievement of excellence in her endeavors.'" Black appointed Shael Polakow-Suransky to the academic-officer role, and assumed her post January 1, 2011. Steiner announced his own resignation the very same afternoon, but did not disclose any reason. Before her appointment was approved, Bloomberg's office announced supporters of his choice included former Mayors Rudy Giuliani and Ed Koch, State Senator Malcolm Smith, City Council Majority Leader Joel Rivera. Oprah Winfrey has also publicly supported Black as the chancellor.

After taking office, Black upset parents on January 14, 2011, when responding to a question from a parent about overcrowded classrooms in New York City by jokingly suggesting that the solution to future overcrowding may be birth control. Black also said at the same meeting that making decisions about satisfying classroom space concerns is like making "many Sophie's Choices" – a reference to a novel in which a mother is forced to choose which of her children is killed at Auschwitz concentration camp. A spokesman for the Department of Education later said Black cares about overcrowding, and "regrets if she left a different impression by making an off-handed joke in the course of that conversation."

As schools chancellor, Black presided over meetings on February 1 and February 3, 2011, to close 22 schools that the city classified as failing. Towards the end of the meeting on February 1, Black spoke to the crowd of parents. At that meeting Black told the crowd "I can't speak if you're shouting," and after the crowd continued to boo Black, she responded by imitating the crowd's jeers in a "mocking" fashion. As a result, at the following meeting on February 3, Black was booed by parents and criticized by members of the New York City Council.

Mayor Bloomberg and Black engaged in a campaign to build support for Black's appointment by appealing to celebrities such as Oprah Winfrey. Numerous emails documented this campaign, however mayor Bloomberg resisted release of the emails. In April 2013 Bloomberg lost his legal resistance to the release and the emails were released.

== Personal ==
Black has been married since 1982 to Thomas E. Harvey, an attorney, and has two children.

== Bibliography ==
- Black, Cathie P. (2007). Basic Black: The Essential Guide for Getting Ahead at Work (and in Life). Crown Business. ISBN 978-0-307-35110-4.

BASIC BLACK reached No. 1 on the Wall Street Journal Business Books list (Nov. 6, 2007) and Business Week best-seller list (Jan. 3, 2008), and No. 3 on the New York Times Business Books List (Nov. 11, 2007). The book has been licensed for translated editions in 12 countries including China, Mexico, Brazil, Japan, Russia, Korea, Poland, Israel, Saudi Arabia, Indonesia, Romania and Croatia. The paperback edition debuted Sept. 9, 2008.

Educational offices
Preceded by Joel Klein	Schools Chancellor of New York City; January 1, 2011-April 7, 2011	Succeeded by Dennis Walcott
