= Philip Banks III =

American police officer; deputy mayor of New York City

Phil Banks
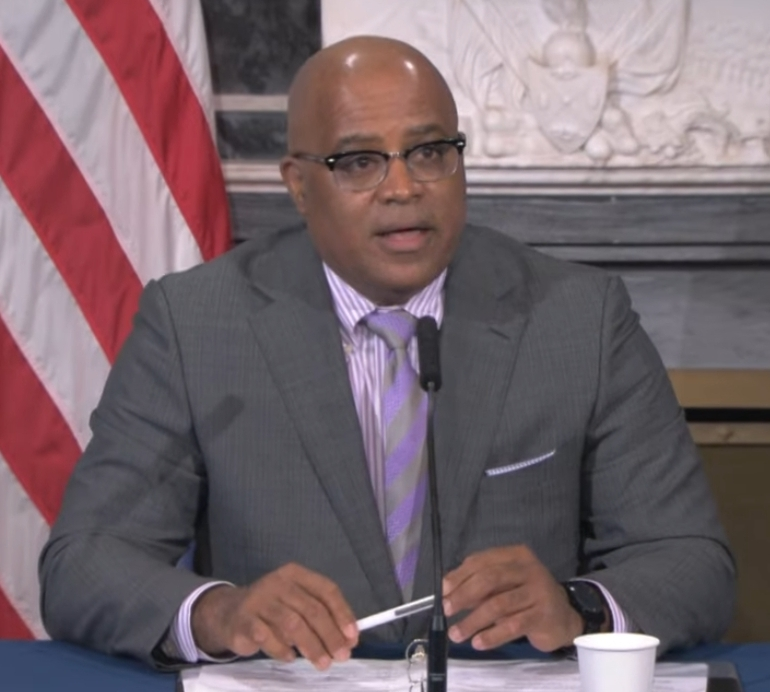
- Banks in 2023

Deputy Mayor of New York City for Public Safety
- In office January 7, 2022 – October 7, 2024
- Mayor: Eric Adams
- Assistant Deputy Mayor: Louis Molina (2023-2024); Chauncey Parker (2024)
- Preceded by: Milton Mollen
- Succeeded by: Chauncey Parker

Chief of the New York City Police Department
- In office March 28, 2013 – October 31, 2014
- Appointed by: Raymond Kelly
- Mayor: Bill de Blasio
- Preceded by: Joseph Esposito
- Succeeded by: James P. O'Neill

Personal details
- Born: Philip Banks III; December 25, 1962 (age 63) Brooklyn, New York, U.S.
- Relatives: David C. Banks (brother); Terence Banks (brother); Sheena Wright (sister-in-law); Tanya Wright (sister-in-law)
- Education: Lincoln University (BS)

Philip Banks III (born December 25, 1962) is the former deputy mayor of New York City for public safety and a retired law enforcement officer who served as NYPD chief of department in 2013 and 2014. As chief of department, Banks oversaw all patrol and specialty units. He resigned in the midst of the investigations into the Eric Adams administration.

== Life and education ==
Banks's mother was a secretary and his father, Philip Banks Jr., was a lieutenant in the New York City Police Department. Banks grew up in Southeast Queens. He has two brothers, including David C. Banks, has been appointed as New York City Schools Chancellor and Terence Banks, a former MTA official who retired in 2023 after 25 years. Banks earned a Bachelor of Science degree in business administration from Lincoln University and graduated from the two-week long Police Management Institute at Columbia University in 2001. Banks is a member of Phi Beta Sigma fraternity, Mu chapter.

== Career ==
=== New York Police Department ===
Banks joined the New York City Police Department in July 1986 and began his career on patrol in the 81st Precinct. He was promoted to sergeant in March 1994, lieutenant in May 1997, captain in September 1999, deputy inspector in June 2001, inspector in December 2003, deputy chief in December 2006, and assistant chief in June 2009. He has served in the 70th, 73rd, 79th, 81st, 90th and Central Park precincts in addition to the Patrol Borough Brooklyn South, Harbor Unit, and School Safety Division Investigations Unit.

Banks most recently served as chief of the Community Affairs Bureau. Prior to commanding the Community Affairs Bureau, he was the commanding officer of Patrol Borough Manhattan North and has also commanded the 79th, 81st and Central Park precincts. He has also served as executive officer of Patrol Borough Brooklyn South and the 73rd Precinct.

He was named the first deputy commissioner, replacing Rafael Piñeiro upon his retirement.

==== Resignation ====
After completing a 27-year career with NYPD, Banks resigned from his position as chief of department on October 31, 2014, citing a mix of personal and professional reasons. Speaking to reporters outside City Hall, Commissioner William Bratton said he would accept Banks's resignation "with great regret." It was later revealed that Banks resigned after he found out he was being investigated by the Federal Bureau of Investigation for having $300,000 of unexplained cash in his bank account.

=== Deputy mayor for public safety ===
From January 7, 2022, to October 7, 2024, Banks was the deputy mayor for public safety under Eric Adams.

The FBI searched his home in Hollis, Queens in September 2024. He resigned in the midst of the investigations into the Eric Adams administration.

Police appointments
Preceded by Joseph Esposito	NYPD Chief of Department; 2013–2014	Succeeded by James P. O'Neill
