= Richard Green (chancellor) =

New York City Schools Chancellor

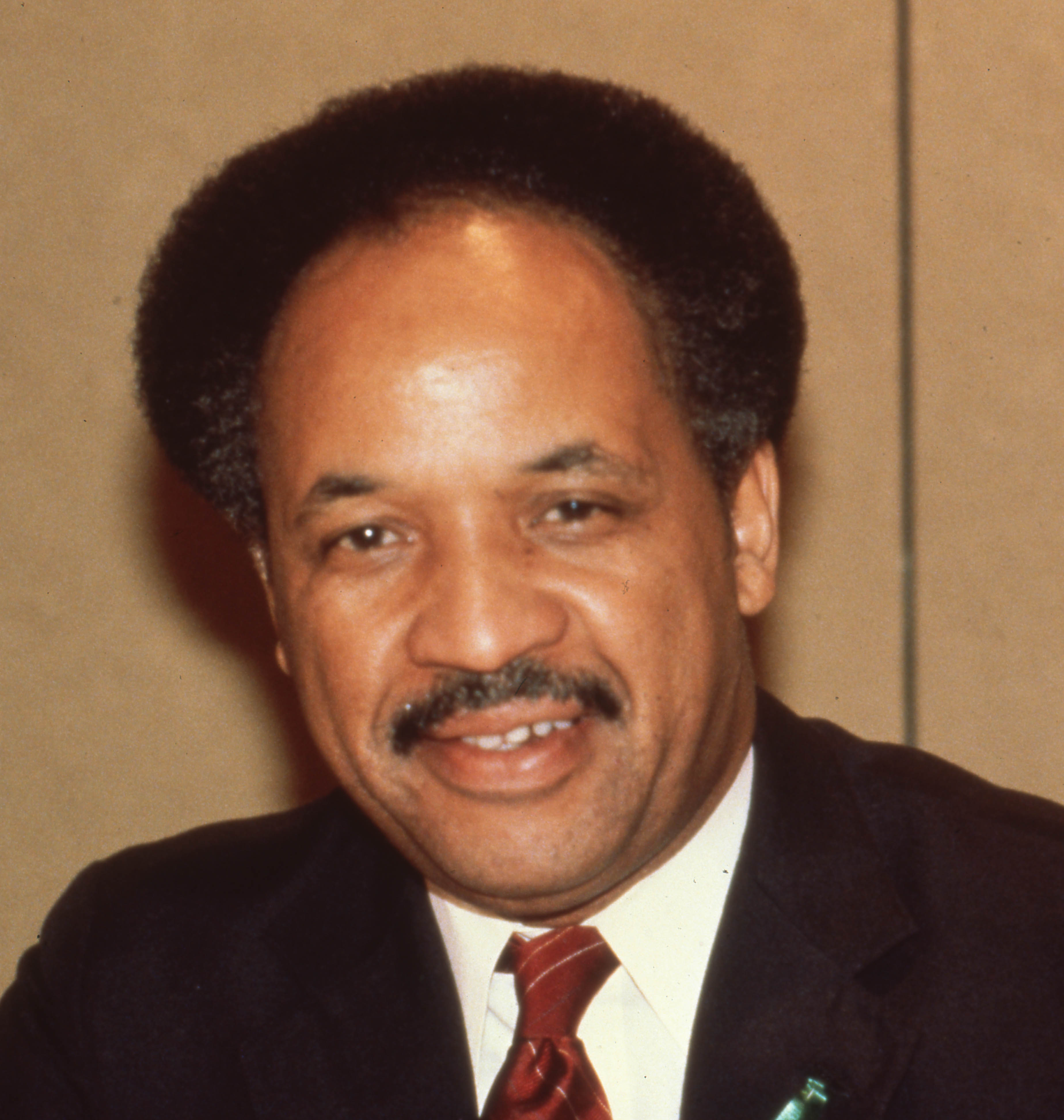
- Green in 1980
- Born: May 27, 1936; Menifee, Arkansas
- Died: May 10, 1989 (aged 52); New York City, New York
- Occupation: Educator
- Spouse: Gwen Green

Dr. Richard R. Green (May 27, 1936 – May 10, 1989) was the first black New York City Schools Chancellor. He served in this capacity from March 1988 to May 1989.

== Early life ==
Green was born in Menifee, Arkansas in 1936. When he was two years old, Green and his three siblings traveled by train with their mother, who moved to Minneapolis, Minnesota. He grew up in a Minneapolis housing project and spent time in a reform school. He later rose to become a teacher, principal, and then the first black Superintendent of the Minneapolis Public Schools.

== Selection as Chancellor ==
Green was selected over other black finalists Dr. Bernard Gifford to become the first black Chancellor of the New York City Public Schools. Green had the support of New York City Board of Education President Robert F. Wagner, Jr. over United Federation of Teachers President Sandra Feldman, who favored Dr. Gifford. On March 3, 1988, Green was installed as Chancellor at a ceremony at Erasmus Hall High School in Brooklyn. He inherited a school system plagued by low graduation rates, a high dropout rate, truancy, guns and other violence, and assembled a team of educators to work with him in addressing these issues and making a difference in academics and safety for the schoolchildren of New York City. In the fall of 1988, Green and UFT President Sandra Feldman made peace with each other by holding a human-sized yellow pencil together on a public school stage, as they welcomed the only group of new schoolteachers which he recruited into the system at a special ceremony.

== Death ==
Green, 52, was a lifelong asthmatic. After arriving in New York City, the air quality due to pollution bothered him, and he had been taken to the hospital having trouble breathing after becoming chancellor. On the evening of May 10, 1989, Green suffered an asthma attack at his apartment in Manhattan. He told his wife "Gwen, I'm not going to make it this time," and died before help arrived. The official cause of death was cardiac arrest due to inability to breathe. He was returned for burial in Minnesota. A memorial service was held at the Cathedral of Saint John the Divine, New York, with the eulogy given by New York City Mayor Edward Koch.

== Memorials ==
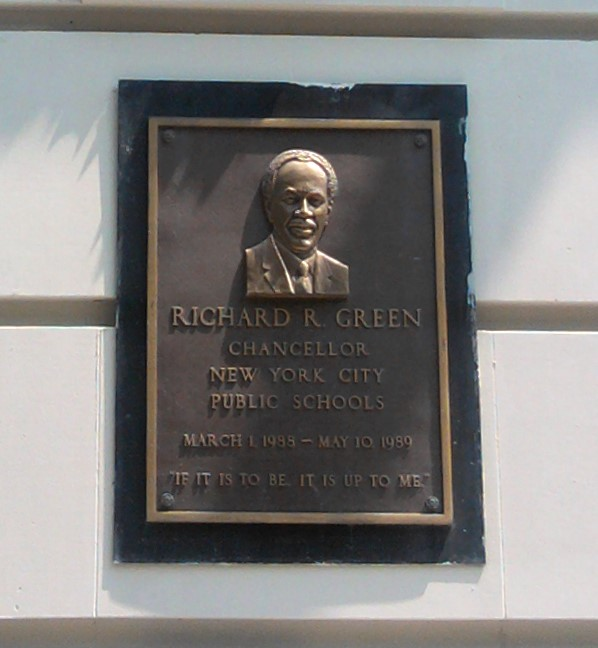
Plaque at East 88th Street, Manhattan

The Council of the Great City Schools, the nation's voice for urban education, presents the nation's highest urban education award annually, the Richard Green and Edward Garner Award. (Garner was former school board president of Denver, Colorado). The award is presented to an urban school superintendent or school board member in alternative years. The winner receives a $10,000 college scholarship to present to a student.

The City of New York Parks Department subsequently dedicated and opened the Dr. Richard Green Playground on Sutter Avenue in Brooklyn.

The city also named two schools after him: the Richard R. Green High School of Teaching in Manhattan and the Richard R. Green Middle School #113 (formerly Olinville Junior High School) in the Bronx in his memory. Richard Green Central Park School in Minneapolis is also named for the chancellor.

Academic offices
Preceded by Dr. Charles Schonhaut (acting chancellor)	Schools Chancellor of New York City; 1988–1989	Succeeded by Bernard Mecklowitz (Acting)
