= LGJ =

LGJ may refer to:

- Bronx School for Law, Government and Justice, a high school in New York City, USA
- Loughborough Junction railway station, a station in south London, UK
- Lalgudi G Jayaraman, Indian violinist
