= Joel Klein =

American lawyer (born 1946)

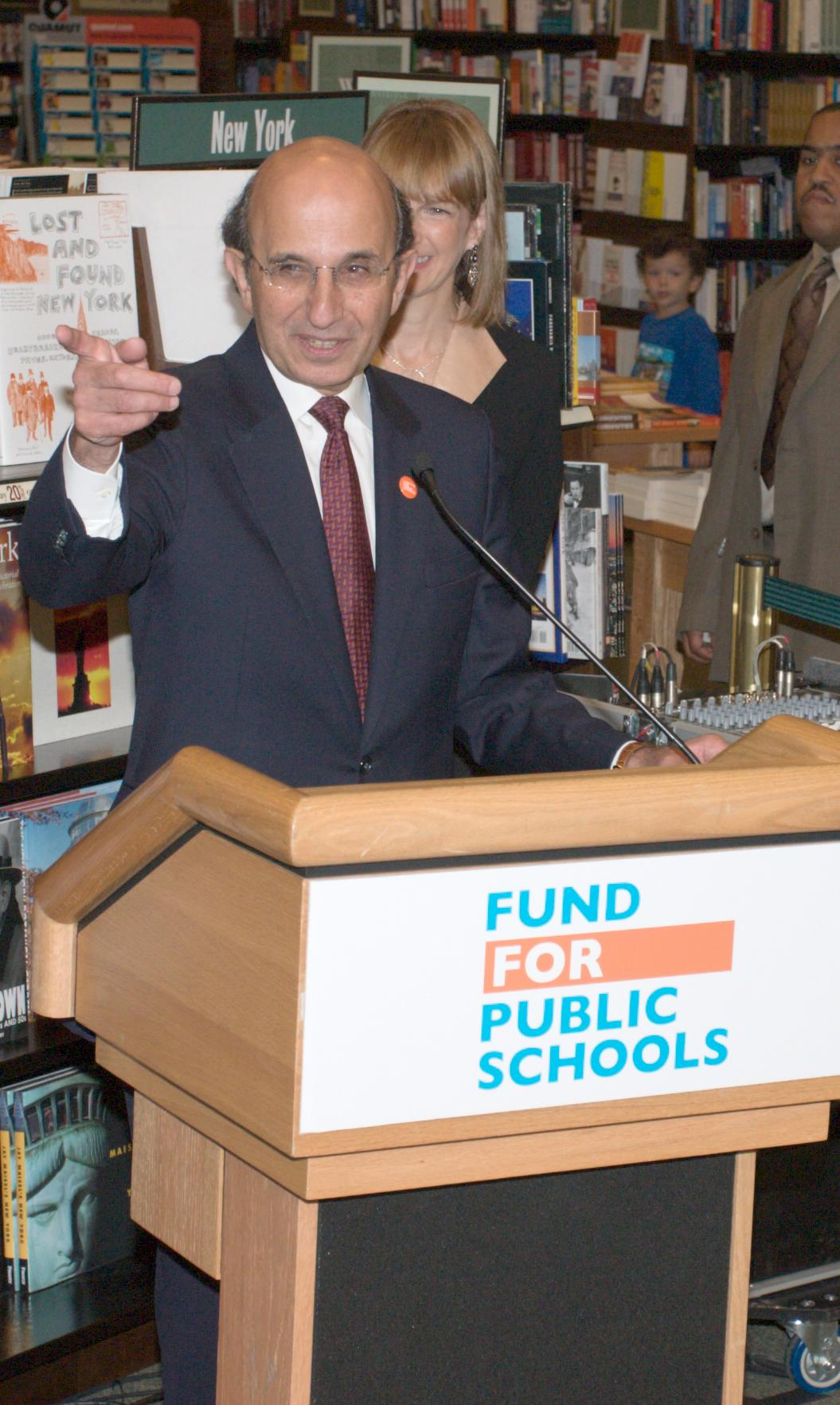

Chancellor of the New York City Department of Education
- In office August 19, 2002 – January 1, 2011
- Appointed by: Michael Bloomberg
- Preceded by: Harold Levy
- Succeeded by: Cathie Black

United States Assistant Attorney General for the Antitrust Division
- In office 1996–2000
- President: Bill Clinton
- Preceded by: Anne Bingaman
- Succeeded by: Douglas Melamed

Deputy White House Counsel
- In office July 1993 – March 1995
- President: Bill Clinton
- Preceded by: Vince Foster
- Succeeded by: James Castello

Personal details
- Born: October 25, 1946 (age 80) New York City, New York, U.S.
- Party: Democratic
- Spouse: Nicole Seligman
- Education: Columbia University (BA); Harvard University (JD)

Joel Irwin Klein (born October 25, 1946) is an American lawyer and school superintendent. He was the chancellor of the New York City Department of Education, the largest public school system in the United States, from 2002 to 2011. He previously served as the Assistant Attorney General of the Antitrust Division of the U.S. Department of Justice from 1996 to 2000 during the administration of President Bill Clinton.

New York magazine ranked Klein as one of the most influential people in public education. Klein had never obtained the common formal credentials that one would have to take a leadership role in a public school system, and Klein had a short duration of teaching experience.

== Early life and education ==
Klein grew up in New York City with Jewish heritage and attended public schools, graduating from William Cullen Bryant High School in Queens in 1963. He attended Columbia University, graduating magna cum laude and Phi Beta Kappa. He received his J.D. degree from Harvard Law School, again graduating magna cum laude, in 1971. He then clerked for Chief Judge David L. Bazelon on the United States Court of Appeals for the D.C. Circuit from 1973 until 1974, before then clerking for U.S. Supreme Court Justice Lewis Powell.

== Career ==
In 1975, Klein joined the legal team of the Washington, DC, non-profit Mental Health Law Project. The MHLP was an independent non-profit organization that brought class-action suits to establish rights for mentally and developmentally disabled clients. In that capacity, Klein specialized in constitutional and health-care. After working there for a year, he went into private practice, working for five years before founding a law firm with several partners. In the 1990s, Klein served in the White House Counsel's office under President Bill Clinton, before being appointed to the United States Department of Justice. There, he was appointed United States Assistant Attorney General for the Antitrust Division, and in this capacity he was the lead prosecutor in the antitrust case United States v. Microsoft. Prior to his appointment to chancellor in 2002 by Mayor Michael Bloomberg, Klein was counsel to Bertelsmann, an international media group.

Klein was rumored to be one of Barack Obama's candidates for Secretary of Education. Ultimately, the position went to the chief executive officer of Chicago Public Schools, Arne Duncan, then to New York State Education Commissioner John King Jr.

== New York City School Chancellor ==
In 1998, before Klein became Chancellor, the New York City Board of Education transferred responsibility for school safety to the New York City Police Department. Klein has been criticized for not seeking to alter this arrangement or to curb the conduct of the Police Department's school safety agents in the face of allegations of abuse. Klein has praised the work of the school-safety agents in contributing to a decrease in crime in the public schools.

Despite their opposing positions in the Justice Department antitrust case against Microsoft, Klein was able to work with the Gates Foundation to fund the creation of smaller schools in New York City. At the 43 small high schools funded by the Gates Foundation graduation rates are 73% compared to 53% at the schools they replaced. The researchers only examined schools selectively; for example, 33 small schools were omitted from the analysis. According to Bob Herbert, Bill Gates, speaking about the national movement for smaller schools, stated in 2008, that “Simply breaking up existing schools into smaller units often did not generate the gains we were hoping for.”. A series of analyses by the research institute MDRC found that the "Small Schools of Choice" (SSC) had "marked increases in progress toward graduation and in graduation rates" for three successive cohorts of students analyzed (students who entered the SSCs in 2005, 2006, and 2007) compared with other schools, including students of color, compared with students of color at similar schools. (Small Schools of Choice are academically non-selective, small in size, and were structured to be a reasonable choice for students of varying academic backgrounds.)

In 2004, a controversy beset Klein's administration, as two members of his staff—deputy chancellor Diana Lam and lawyer Chad Vignola—both resigned amid accusations of nepotism; she was accused of helping her husband gain employment in the system without following conflicts of interest procedures, and Vignola was accused of trying to cover it up. A report by Schools Investigator Richard Condon found Lam helped her husband get two jobs improperly, and criticized Vignola for falsely claiming that the husband was a volunteer rather than a hired employee.

In 2005, Klein fired Columbia University professor Rashid Khalidi from the teacher training program, reportedly because of Khalidi's political views. After the controversial decision, Columbia University president Lee Bollinger spoke out on Khalidi's behalf, writing: "The department's decision to dismiss Professor Khalidi from the program was wrong and violates First Amendment principles.... The decision was based solely on his purported political views and was made without any consultation and apparently without any review of the facts." The program's creator Mark Willner stated that (Khalidi) "spoke on geography and demography," and that "There was nothing controversial, nothing political."

In 2007, Klein installed a computer system called The Achievement Reporting and Innovation System (ARIS), at a cost of $95 million, with records on 1 million current and former students. Teachers and parents were able to track student progress with the system. After Klein left his job as chancellor to work at the News Corp., a company owned by the News Corp. got a contract for nearly $10 million to manage the system in 2012. Subsequent News Corp. contracts were worth millions more. Klein denied a conflict of interest. Finally, in 2014, the Education Department decided to abandon the system, due to its high cost, limited functionality, and little use by parents and staff.

In 2007, the Klein launched a major redesign of the formula used to fund schools. Previously, funding for teachers had been based on the salaries of the teachers in the building, leading to more funding for schools in schools with students from more affluent backgrounds, as teachers tended to stay at those schools longer (and be relatively better paid than teachers with less experience). Under Klein's "Fair Student Funding" program, schools were given amounts of money based on the enrollment and demographics of students, such as special education and low-income. This eventually accounted for 66% of all funding to schools.

During the Bloomberg Administration, whose educational legacy was largely determined by Klein's chancellorship, graduation rates in New York City went up for all ethnic groups, although the gap between graduation rates between ethnic groups remained stubbornly persistent. From 2005 to 2012, the graduation rate for white students rose from 64% to 78%, for Asian-American students from 63% to 82%, and for Black students from 40% to 60%. Overall, high school graduation rates increased from 54% in 2004 to almost 75% in 2013.

=== Balanced literacy ===
Klein played an important role in changing the way that literacy was taught in New York schools. In 2003, he introduced a "balanced literacy" approach that was controversial among education experts who said the approach was unsupported by research. The approach de-emphasized direct instruction, in particular phonics instruction. No curricula existed at the time for this approach, leading Lucy Calkins to write a textbook on the subject in three weeks ahead of the 2003–2004 school year. In 2022, the New Yorker reported that New York was shifting away from this approach to literacy amid controversies over low literacy rates.

== News Corporation ==
On November 9, 2010, Bloomberg announced that Klein would resign as chancellor and would take a position as an executive vice president for News Corporation. Klein's date of departure was not immediately clear but it was later announced that he would be gone at the end of the year. He was replaced by Cathie Black, chairman of Hearst Magazines and former president of USA Today, on January 3, 2011.

On July 6, 2011, Rupert Murdoch, chairman of News Corporation and the company's CEO, announced that Joel Klein would "provide important oversight and guidance" in the internal investigation of phone hacking at News of the World. Klein and fellow director Viet D. Dinh took over the investigation from News International UK Chief Executive Rebekah Brooks, whose own involvement in the phone hacking scandal made her unable to continue as an impartial investigator.

Since joining News Corp, Klein has recruited at least two other executives from the New York City Department of Education. In February 2011, NYCDoE Communications Director Natalie Ravitz announced that she would be joining News Corp as Klein's chief of staff. According to GothamSchools, a nonprofit, non-partisan news website that reports on the New York City schools, "Ravitz is following a well-worn path from the department to NewsCorp: Ex-schools chief Joel Klein, who was chancellor when Ravitz was hired, now heads the company's growing education division. Last summer, Klein picked Kristen Kane, the department's former chief operating officer, to become the division's COO. He also acquired Wireless Generation, the technology company that developed and managed ARIS, the city's school data warehouse."

Klein additionally served as the CEO of Amplify, an educational technology company which was bought by News Corp in 2010. While CEO of Amplify, Klein met with financier Jeffrey Epstein six times in 2013, years after Epstein had been convicted of sex offenses against minors. Klein initially met with Epstein at the behest of his friend Mortimer Zuckerman, who was considering hiring Epstein for estate planning. Klein advised against hiring Epstein. Klein additionally corresponded with Epstein via email and discussed investment in educational technology. Epstein introduced Klein to venture capitalist Joi Ito. Klein left Amplify in 2015.

== Oscar Health and Juul Labs ==
In 2016, Klein became a "top executive" with New York health insurance start-up Oscar Health, which has a focus on technology. In 2021, while still at Oscar, Klein joined the board of Juul Labs, a tobacco company.

== Personal life ==
Klein is married to Nicole Seligman, general counsel to Howard Stringer of Sony Corp. Seligman was on the legal team of then-President Bill Clinton during impeachment proceedings in the United States Senate.

== See also ==
- List of Jewish American jurists
- List of law clerks for the first seat of the Supreme Court of the United States

Legal offices
Preceded by Anne Bingaman	United States Assistant Attorney General for the Antitrust Division; 1996–2000	Succeeded by Douglas Melamed
Political offices
Preceded by Harold Levy	Chancellor of New York City Schools; 2002–2011	Succeeded by Cathie Black
