= Carmen Fariña =

American school chancellor

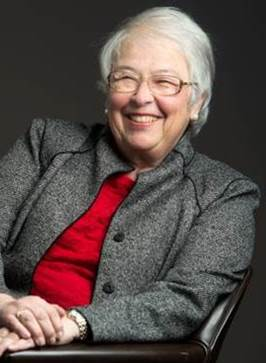
- Fariña in 2015

Chancellor of the New York City Department of Education
- In office January 1, 2014 – April 2, 2018
- Mayor: Bill De Blasio
- Preceded by: Dennis Walcott
- Succeeded by: Richard Carranza

Personal details
- Born: Carmen Guillén; April 5, 1943 (age 83) Brooklyn, New York
- Spouse: Antonio Fariña Jr. (m. 1965)
- Children: 2
- Education: New York University; Brooklyn College; Fordham University; Pace University

Carmen Fariña (née Guillén; born April 5, 1943) is a former New York City Schools Chancellor and head of the New York City Department of Education. Announced by Mayor-elect Bill de Blasio on December 30, 2013, she was the first New York City chancellor to have had schools supervision training and experience since Board of Education chancellor Rudy Crew.

Fariña had been a teacher, principal, superintendent, and the Deputy Chancellor of Teaching and Learning from 2004 to 2006. In December 2017, Farina announced she would leave her position after a replacement was named. She finished her term alongside the new Chancellor, Richard Carranza.

== Early life and education ==
Fariña was born in Brooklyn, New York, to Galician parents who fled Spain during the Spanish Civil War, Fariña was the only Spanish-speaker in her kindergarten class and learned English in school. The language barrier was so severe, that Fariña's "teacher marked her absent every day for six weeks because Carmen then surnamed Guillén, did not answer when the teacher, who was unfamiliar with Spanish, called Quillan during roll call."

She was the first person in her family to attend college. She holds a Bachelor of Science degree from New York University and three master's degrees from Brooklyn College (bilingual education), Fordham University (gifted/arts education), and Pace University (administration and supervision).

== Career ==
Fariña started her career at P.S. 29 in Cobble Hill, Brooklyn, where she flourished as a classroom teacher specializing in the social sciences. Throughout her 22 years there, "she was beginning to make a name for herself across the city, pioneering a curriculum that blended social studies and literacy." One of her students there was future novelist and professor Jonathan Lethem, who called her the "perfect" teacher and dedicated his first novel, Gun, with Occasional Music, to her.

As District 15's Core Curriculum coordinator, Fariña published her multicultural and interdisciplinary program, "Making Connections", a model the-then Board of Education replicated in every district in the city.

From 1991 to 2001, Fariña served as principal of P.S. 6, replacing 80% of the staff there. Under her leadership, that school's ranking among public elementary schools on the citywide reading test rose from 76th to fourth from 1988 to 1997, with 91.8 percent of students classified as reading at grade level.

During this time, she was also an adjunct professor at Bank Street College: P.S. 6 served as a model site for prospective principals, hosting more than 500 visitors a year. She left P.S. 6 in 2001 after being elected community superintendent of Brooklyn's District 15. She later served as superintendent of Region 8.

=== Deputy chancellor at the New York City Department of Education ===
From 2004 to 2006, Fariña served as Deputy Chancellor for Teaching and Learning at the New York City Department of Education, where she invested $40 million to expand programs for middle school students, including Saturday classes, organizational and study skills workshops, and parent counseling. She also improved services for students with disabilities. In the summer of 2014, she announced her support of "balanced literacy", an English curriculum that emphasizes free reading and writing at the expense of teacher-led instruction.

In 2017, Queens Borough President Melinda Katz sent three letters to her, requesting that the process for hiring high school principals be changed. Katz said that the current process was “entirely shrouded under a veil of silence and secrecy.”

In March 2018, after Alberto M. Carvalho publicly turned down the job, Mayor de Blasio announced Richard Carranza would succeed Fariña as the next chancellor, with Fariña departing at the end of April.

=== Reception ===
The New York Post condemned Farina in 2017 for restoring levels of bureaucracy that her predecessor, Joel Klein, under Mayor Michael Bloomberg, had eliminated, and for presiding over "diploma mills", referring to her "proudest achievement, boosting city high-school graduation rates to 72 percent" as "hollow" as "only 37 percent of those [high school] 'graduates' are ready for college."

StudentsFirstNY, an independent pro-student public advocacy group, determined that “Diploma Mills are a serious problem”, that “College remediation in New York City is off the Charts”, and that the “de Blasio administration has no clear plan for schools with the worst college readiness rates”.

Fariña was roundly criticized by New York media for a February 13, 2014 press conference alongside Mayor Bill de Blasio during a snowstorm, in which she stated, on a day which produced 10 inches of snow, "It's absolutely a beautiful day out here." Total snowfall for the storm was 13 inches in Manhattan; local schools remained open during the snow event.

== Personal life ==
Carmen Guillén married Antonio Fariña Jr., an accountant, in 1965, in New York City. They have two daughters.

Educational offices
Preceded by Dennis Walcott	Chancellor of the New York City Department of Education; 2014–2018	Succeeded by Richard Carranza
