= Anthony J. Alvarado =

American educator and administrator (1942–2024)

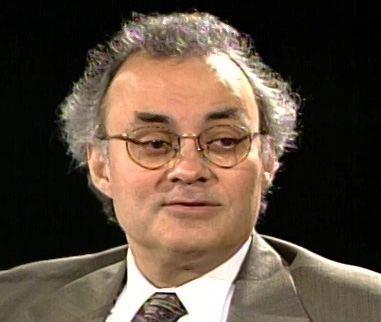
- Alvarado on CUNY TV's Urban Agenda (1995)
- Born: Anthony John Alvarado; June 10, 1942; South Bronx
- Died: January 1, 2024 (aged 81); Coronado, California

Anthony John Alvarado (June 10, 1942 – January 1, 2024) was an American educator and administrator who served from 1983 to 1984 as New York City School Chancellor, overseeing the operation of the largest public school district in the United States as the school system's first Hispanic Chancellor. He was forced to step down in the wake of charges of professional misconduct and financial irregularities.

== Biography ==
Alvarado was born on June 10, 1942, in the South Bronx, where he attended St. Anselm's Catholic School and Fordham Preparatory School. He earned a bachelor's and master's degree in English from Fordham University, and took additional education classwork at Hunter College. He started in the New York City Public Schools in a school in the Bronx and spent a year teaching at James Monroe High School. After a series of administrative positions and promotions at Board of Education headquarters on Livingston Street and in District 9, he was named in 1973 as superintendent of District 4, which covered the largely African American and Hispanic community of East Harlem in Manhattan.

During a decade heading the 14,000-student District 4, Alvarado established school-within-a-school programs that allowed students to specialize in their preferred area of interest, a program that helped attract attendance from students living outside the district. During his tenure in the district, twice as many students were reading at grade level, growing from 25% to 48% from 1979 to 1982. In recognition of his accomplishments, he received a $5,000 award in 1981 from the Fund for the City of New York.

Alvarado replaced many of the supervisory positions in the district with Hispanic educators. A 1975 complaint against the district filed with the New York State Division of Human Rights found that the district had discriminated when it replaced a white school principal and ordered that he be reinstated with back pay and full seniority. The president of the Council of Supervisors and Administrators, which represents supervisors told The New York Times that there had been other conflicts with Alvarado regarding his staffing changes at the assistant principal and principal level. In 1977, then-Chancellor Irving Anker criticized the number of highly paid administrators on the district's staff, though Alvarado argued that they were necessary to put into place the academic changes and improvements he implemented and that spending was in line with that of other districts.

Alvarado was named as New York City School Chancellor in April 1983. He committed himself to improving New York City's public high schools and sought to implement in the city's 32 school districts many of the innovations he had planned in District 4.

In a report issued in March 1984 by the New York City Department of Investigation, Alvarado was charged with borrowing $88,000 from employees under his supervision "in a manner that was inherently coercive and frequently deceptive", that he allowed employees who had loaned him money to earn excessive amounts of overtime pay and had used school employees for personal purposes, including having his house painted by district employees. He was also charged with having made false statements on loan applications, failing to pay parking tickets and property taxes, and for a failure to report $128,000 in capital gains and tax refunds on filings with the Internal Revenue Service. Alvarado said that many of the violations were of a technical nature and occurred because he was busy working 60 to 80 hours a week as Schools Chancellor. Citing the example of paying to have his office painted out of funds that had been designated for overtime pay, Alvarado argued that "in choosing whether to get work accomplished or not violate a technical procedure, I chose to get the job done". Alvarado told Time magazine that he "never used public funds or the public system for personal gain".

Alvarado resigned as School Chancellor in May 1984 in the wake of professional misconduct charges and Nathan Quinones was selected as Chancellor, having served in the position on an interim basis after Alvarado placed himself on leave two months earlier. While Quinones had been relegated to a minor role under Alvarado, once Quinones became acting Chancellor he removed several administrators tied to Alvarado and restored the structure of high school administration that Alvarado had eliminated.

In 1998, Alvarado was awarded the Charles A. Dana Foundation Award for Pioneering Achievement in Education "for his commitment to the continual professional development of teachers and school administrators as an essential catalyst for the increased improvement of students’ academic achievements" while Superintendent of District 2.

== Personal life and death ==
His wife, Ellen Kirshbaum, led the East Harlem Performing Arts School and later worked as community liaison for Community School District 4. Alvarado lived with his wife and two children in Park Slope, Brooklyn, together with two children from Alvarado's first marriage.

Alvarado died on January 1, 2024, at his home Coronado, California, due to blood cancer and pneumonia. He was 81.

Academic offices
Preceded by Richard F. Halverson	Schools Chancellor of New York City; 1983–1984	Succeeded by Nathan Quinones
