= David C. Banks =

New York City Schools Chancellor

David Banks
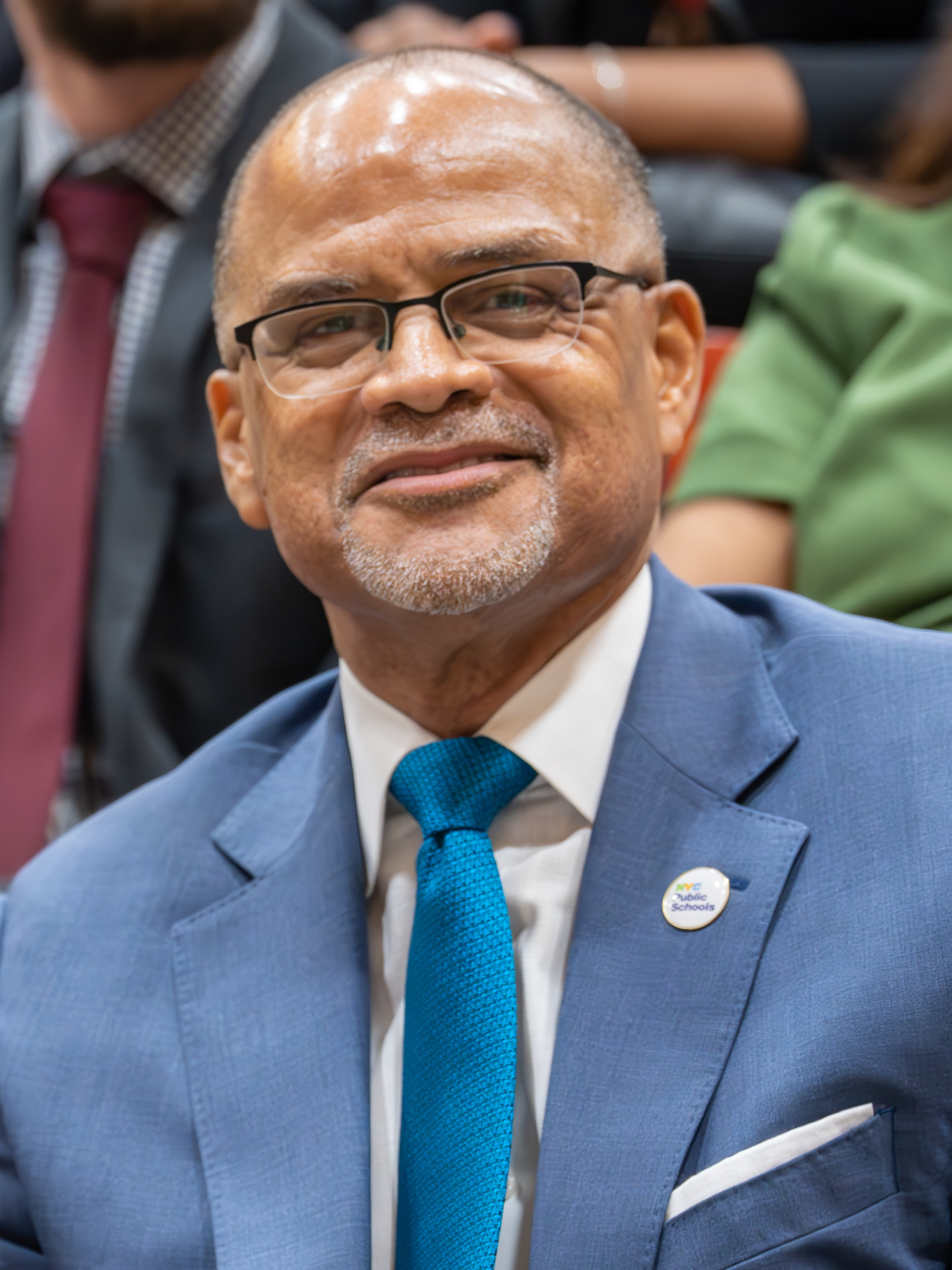

Chancellor of the New York City Department of Education
- In office January 1, 2022 – October 16, 2024
- Mayor: Eric Adams
- Preceded by: Meisha Ross Porter
- Succeeded by: Melissa Aviles-Ramos

Personal details
- Born: January 14, 1962 (age 63)
- Spouse: Sheena Wright (m. 2024)
- Children: 4
- Relatives: Tanya Wright (sister-in-law); Philip Banks III (brother); Terence Banks (brother)
- Education: Rutgers University, New Brunswick (BA); St. John’s University (JD)

David C. Banks (born January 14, 1962) is an American attorney and educator who served as the 31st New York City Schools chancellor in the administration of Mayor Eric Adams.

== Early life and education ==
Banks's mother was a secretary and his father, Philip Banks Jr., was a lieutenant in the New York City Police Department. Banks grew up in Southeast Queens. He has two brothers, including Philip Banks III, who retired from the NYPD as chief of department on October 31, 2014 and Terence Banks, a former MTA official who retired in 2023 after 25 years . Banks earned a Bachelor of Arts degree from Rutgers University and a Juris Doctor from St. John's University.

== Career ==
Banks worked for the city’s law department and the state attorney general before becoming a public school teacher in Crown Heights. He also helped to create the Bronx School for Law, Government and Justice, a prototype for the small schools initiative. Banks served as president and CEO of the Eagle Academy Foundation, a network of public all-boys' schools until his appointment as New York City Schools Chancellor.

As chancellor, Banks has prioritized early literacy through NYC Reads and career-connected learning through the FutureReady and Modern Youth Apprenticeship initiatives. On May 9, 2023, Banks launched NYC Reads, an overhaul of how New York City Public Schools teaches reading. The overhaul aligns the entire school system under three approved reading curricula that are based in the 'science of reading,' and a unified curriculum for early childhood programs.

In 2024, in the midst of the investigations into the Eric Adams administration, Banks announced his intent to retire at the end of the year after federal agents seized his devices. Saferwatch, a company developing a "panic button" app, sought to provide the app to schools in the City of New York. The company hired in early 2024 the government relations services of Terence Banks, brother of David C. Banks who was serving as the New York City Schools chancellor. The city's ethics rules prohibit lobbying family members.

== Personal life ==
Banks's wife, Sheena Wright, served as the First Deputy Mayor of New York City from January 2023 to October 2024. Prior to that, she served as the Deputy Mayor for Strategic Policy Initiatives of New York City from January 2022 to December 2022 and as the first female president and CEO of the United Way of New York City. Banks and Wright married in September 2024.

Educational offices
| Preceded by Meisha Ross Porter | Chancellor of the New York City Department of Education; 2022–2024 | Succeeded by Melissa Aviles-Ramos |
