= Tanya Wright =

American actress

- Born: May 3, 1971 (age 55); Bronx, New York, U.S.
- Education: Vassar College (AB); Harvard University (MEd)
- Occupations: Actress; entrepreneur; author
- Years active: 1986–present
- Relatives: Sheena Wright (sister); Philip Banks III (brother-in-law); Terence Banks (brother-in-law); David C. Banks (brother-in-law)

Tanya Wright (born May 3, 1971) is an American actress. Born and raised in South Bronx, New York, Wright studied Comparative Literature at Vassar College. After her graduation, she joined the cast of The Cosby Show as Tanya Simpson. She is known for her role as Phyllis Brooks on Buddies, as well as her recurring roles on 24 as Patty Brooks, NYPD Blue as Officer Maya Anderson, on True Blood as Deputy Kenya Jones, and as Crystal on the Netflix original series Orange Is the New Black.

== Early life and education ==
Wright was born on May 3, 1971 in the Bronx to a 15-year-old mother, Debra Fraser-Howze, who later became an AIDS activist.

Wright is an alumna of the Oliver Scholars Program and graduated high school from George School, a private Quaker school in Pennsylvania. She received a degree in Independent Studies/Comparative Literature at Vassar College. She earned an master's of education from Harvard University's Graduate School of Education in 2022. Her sister, Sheena Wright, is the First Deputy Mayor of New York City and formerly the president of the United Way of New York City.

== Career ==
Wright appeared in several television shows, including "The Cosby Show" (1984–1992), "Family Matters" (CBS, 1989–1998), and "Parker Lewis" (Fox, 1990–92). She also starred in the television series "Living Single" (Fox, 1993–1998), "Beverly Hills 90210" (1990–2000), and "Burke's Law" (CBS, 1994–95). She appeared on "The Wayans Bros." (Warner Bros. Television Network, 1995–99), "Buddies" (ABC, 1995–96), and "The Jamie Foxx Show" (Warner Bros. Television Network, 1996–2001). She took on roles on "The District" (2000–04), "24" (Fox, 2001–2010), and "The Handler" (CBS, 2003–04). She was in "Windfall" (NBC, 2006) and in "The Carrie Diaries" (CW, 2013–14).

Wright authored a book titled Butterfly Rising, which was released on August 5, 2012. Wright adapted the book to a screenplay, producing and directing a movie version.

== Filmography ==
=== Film ===
Year	Title	Role	Notes
1999	Mutiny	-	
2001	The Brothers	LaMuzindah	
2005	Ralph & Stanley	Dr. Reynolds	Short
2011	Butterfly Rising	Rose	
2011	Aide-de-Camp	Anna	Short
2012	Why Stop Now	Lisa	
2018	My Christmas Inn	Ellis	TV movie

=== Television ===
Year	Title	Role	Notes
1986	The Cosby Show	Tanya Simpson	Episode: "The Card Game" & "Man Talk"
1991	Parker Lewis Can't Lose	Girlfriend	Episode: "Boy Meets Girl"
1994	Beverly Hills, 90210	Assistant	Episode: "Intervention"
1995	Living Single	Tanya	Episode: "If the Crew Fits"
1995	Family Matters	India	Episode: "We're Going to Disney World: Part 2"
1995	Burke's Law	Scrub Nurse	Episode: "Who Killed the King of the Country Club?"
1996	The Wayans Bros.	Toya	Episode: "The Odd Couples"
1996	Buddies	Phyllis Brooks	Main cast
1996	The Jamie Foxx Show	Casey Coles	Episode: "Burned Twice by the Same Flame"
1998	Police Academy: The Series	Cassandra Cunningham	Recurring cast
1998	Mama Flora's Family	Ernestine	Episode: "Episode #1.1 & #1.2"
1999	Moesha	Andrea	Episode: "Good Vibrations?" & "Fired Up"
2000–01	The District	Laura Clayson/Annette Haywood	Episode: "Imperfect Victims" & "Running Towards Fire"
2001–02	24	Patty Brooks	Recurring cast: Season 1
2002	NYPD Blue	Officer Maya Anderson	Guest: Season 9, recurring cast: Season 10
2003–04	The Handler	Marcy	Main cast
2004	Strong Medicine	Lily's Mother	Episode: "Touched by an Idol"
2006	Windfall	Dr. Bailey	Episode: "Urgent Care"
2007	ER	Megan Strand	Episode: "Sea Change"
2007	Standoff	Diana Marsh	Episode: "Lie to Me"
2008–14	True Blood	Deputy Kenya Jones	Recurring cast
2013	The Carrie Diaries	-	Episode: "Express Yourself"
2013–18	Orange Is the New Black	Crystal Burset	Recurring cast: season 1-4, guest: season 6
2014	The Good Wife	Liana Depaul	Episode: "Message Discipline"
2018	I'm Dying Up Here	Nurse	Episode: "Deathbed Confessions"
2018	Madam Secretary	Dana Cook	Episode: "E Pluribus Unum"
