= InsideSchools =

Organization based in New York City

- Formation: 2002
- Founder: Clara Hemphill
- Headquarters: The New School
- Location: 72 Fifth Avenue, 6th floor New York, NY, 10011
- Parent organization: Center for New York City Affairs
- Website: insideschools.org

Insideschools was founded in 2002 to provide independent insight into New York City public schools and information about the New York City Department of Education. The site includes reviews of the more than 1,400 public schools in the city, information on how to navigate the NYC Department of Education bureaucracy, advice columns that address readers' questions, forums for parents and students to talk with each other, and a blog that is updated daily with school news and commentary. The school reviews are written by journalists who visit each school to interview educators, students and parents and observe what’s happening in the classrooms, cafeterias, hallways and even the bathrooms.

== History ==
The idea was originally launched by journalist Clara Hemphill in the fall of 2000 as a project of Advocates for Children of New York. According to a New York Times story, "the guide was designed to make good on the promise of citywide school choice," and it initially featured 50 reviews of schools in Queens. Hemphill, the author of the guide book series, New York City's Best Public Schools, was director, and Jill Chaifetz, then director of Advocates for Children, and Judy Baum, a former director of information services at the Public Education Association, helped create the site, which was originally under the domain name publicschoolreports.org. On Sept. 2, 2002, the website was re-launched as insideschools.org with "descriptive tidbits (as Zagat's restaurant guides do) focusing on a school's emotional and physical aspects," according to the New York Times. At the time of the re-launch, the staff had compiled profiles of one third of the 1,200 public schools then operating in the city. The reporting and writing was funded by an initial 18-month grant of $650,000 from the Alfred P. Sloan Foundation.

In 2004, The New York Times published an article called "Finding a Neighborhood and a School." The reporter asked Clara Hemphill for a list of noteworthy schools from the website profiles, which they printed alongside real estate assessments of the surrounding neighborhood. The newspaper wrote that Insideschools has a "more impressionistic assessment of each school" than the data provided by the Department of Education.

In December, 2006, Pamela Wheaton took over as director of the project. On June 7, 2007, staff writer Philissa Cramer launched the Insideschools blog. In Sept. 2008, the website was redesigned and relaunched.

In 2010 the Milano School of Policy, Management, and Environment's Center for New York City Affairs took over InsideSchools.
