= Charles Schonhaut =

American educator

Dr. Charles Schonhaut (January 19, 1926 – March 24, 2008) was an American educator who served as the Acting Chancellor of the New York City Public Schools from January 1, 1988, when Nathan Quinones resigned, to March 1, 1988, when Dr. Richard Green (chancellor) was sworn in to replace Quinones. Dr. Schonhaut was Deputy Chancellor under Quinones. After service as schools chancellor, Dr. Schonhaut then served as Dean of the Long Island University School of Education where he also headed an elite program in educational leadership to train 22 selected fellowship winners in educational administration at the graduate level at the Brooklyn campus of Long Island University from 1992 to 1994, not all of whom completed his rigorous program leading to permanent School District Superintendent certification by the New York State Education Department. Fellowship mentors included Dr. Frank Mickens.

Academic offices
Preceded by Nathan Quinones	Schools Chancellor of New York City; January 1, 1988 – March 1, 1988	Succeeded by Dr. Richard Green (chancellor)
