= Kamar Samuels =

Chancellor of New York City Public Schools

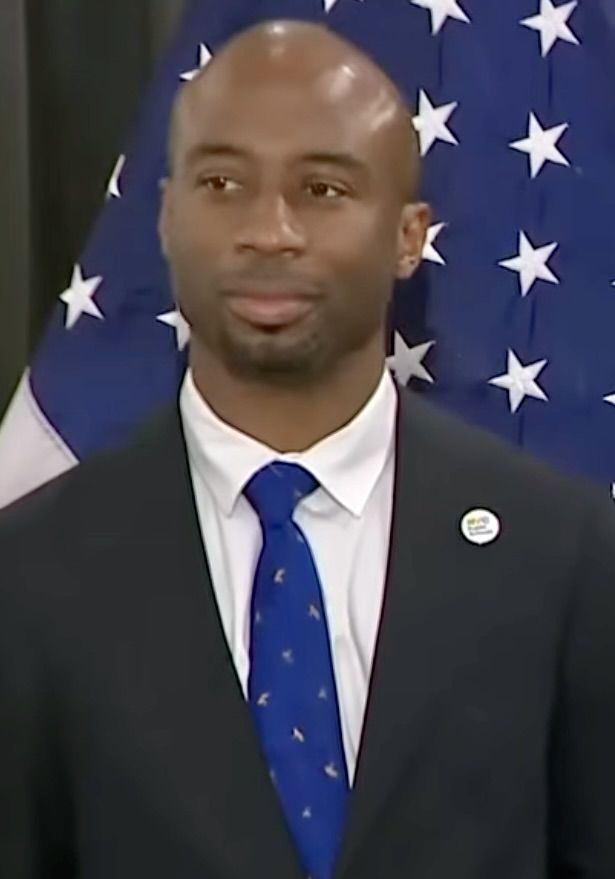
- Samuels in 2026

Chancellor of the New York City Department of Education
- Incumbent
- Assumed office January 1, 2026
- Preceded by: Melissa Aviles-Ramos

Personal details
- Born: Kingston, Jamaica
- Education: Baruch College (BBA, MS); Lehman College (MS)

Kamar Samuels is a Jamaican-American educator who has served as the chancellor of New York City Public Schools since January 1, 2026. Before becoming chancellor, he served as superintendent for Manhattan's District 3 and Brooklyn's District 13.

As chancellor, Samuels leads the nation's largest school district. In 2024–25, New York City Public Schools reported 906,248 students in the city school system, and 148,089 students enrolled in charter schools. The system's adopted budget for fiscal year 2026 was $42.8 billion.

== Early life and education ==
Samuels was born in Jamaica and attended Jamaica College before continuing his education in New York City. He moved to New York City at age 16. He studied accounting at Baruch College and previously worked in finance, including as a finance manager at the National Basketball Association. Samuels earned a Bachelor of Business Administration and a Master of Science in Educational Leadership from Baruch College, and a Master of Science in Childhood Education from Lehman College.

== Career ==
Samuels entered the school system through the NYC Teaching Fellows program and began his education career as an elementary school teacher in the Bronx, including at P.S. 41 (Gun Hill Road School) and P.S./M.S. 194. He began teaching at P.S./M.S. 194 in 2001 as a sixth-grade math teacher.

He later served as principal of the Bronx Writing Academy (MS 323) and held leadership roles in NYC Public Schools central offices, including Executive Director of District School Design and Senior Director of Partnerships and Initiatives. He became superintendent of Brooklyn's District 13 in 2019 and was named superintendent of Manhattan's District 3 in 2022.

Samuels' district leadership has involved school mergers and integration initiatives, including efforts related to admissions policies and gifted programming.

== Schools chancellor ==
Mayor-elect Zohran Mamdani announced Samuels as schools chancellor on December 31, 2025; Samuels began serving on January 1, 2026. Concurrently, Mamdani reversed a campaign position and said he would ask the state legislature to continue mayoral control of city schools while pursuing changes intended to increase community involvement.

In his early communications as chancellor, Samuels emphasized school integration, culturally responsive education, and community engagement as priorities. He also told principals he planned to continue the city's literacy curriculum mandate, NYC Reads, while signaling possible changes to the prior administration's math initiative.
