= The Handler (TV series) =

2003 American TV series

- Title screen
- Also known as: Street Boss
- Genre: Thriller
- Written by: Alan Di Fiore; Jim Kouf
- Directed by: Rob Bailey; Jeremy Kagan
- Starring: Joe Pantoliano; Hill Harper; Anna Belknap; Lola Glaudini; Tanya Wright
- Country of origin: United States
- Original language: English
- No. of seasons: 1
- No. of episodes: 16 (2 unaired)

Production
- Production locations: Los Angeles, California, United States
- Running time: 60 minutes
- Production companies: Haddock Entertainment; Viacom Productions

Original release
- Network: CBS
- Release: September 26, 2003 – January 30, 2004

The Handler is an American crime series created by Canadian writer-producer Chris Haddock, airing in the United States on CBS from September 26, 2003 to January 30, 2004. The show starred Joe Pantoliano as Joe Renato, an FBI agent assigned to train and handle (hence the title) young undercover officers in the FBI. Other cast members included Hill Harper, Anna Belknap, Lola Glaudini, and Tanya Wright. The show was cancelled after 14 episodes.

Cast of The Handler

== Cast ==
- Joe Pantoliano as Joe Renato
- Hill Harper as Darnell
- Anna Belknap as Lily
- Lola Glaudini as Heather
- Tanya Wright as Marcy

== Episode list ==
No.	Title	Directed by	Written by	Original release date	Viewers (millions)
1	"Pilot"	Mick Jackson	Chris Haddock	September 26, 2003	12.6
An FBI agent trains and handles agents who go under cover to solve crimes; Joe mourns the loss of one of his own as the dangers of the job become all too real.
2	"It's Only Rock and Roll"	Mick Jackson	Chris Haddock	October 3, 2003	10.5
Darnell and Heather go undercover to infiltrate a band of bank robbers making its way across the U.S.; Lily poses as a waitress to get the goods on a dirty judge in a case that gets personal for Joe.
3	"Bruno Comes Back"	Jean de Segonzac	Chris Haddock & Alan DiFiore	October 10, 2003	7.5
Artie, Joe's friend, comes back into town, and offers Joe a business proposition. His plan is to dig a tunnel from a bookstore to the bank across the street right into the vault. Lily goes undercover as the bookstore owner to keep the customers distracted from what's going on in the basement with Joe and Bruno. Also, things get complicated when Joe's old flame shows up and wants to move in with him.
4	"Body of Evidence"	Lou Antonio	Chris Haddock & Ken Solarz	October 17, 2003	8.8
Joe and Lola use a dead body to weave a net for a known killer in order to find where he's buried the bodies; Darnell and Lily act as a couple on the rocks in order to create a diversion while the FBI plants a bug in a suspect's car.
5	"Under Color of Law"	J. Miller Tobin	Chris Haddock & Frank Military	October 24, 2003	8.7
Joe handles a "black op" for his FBI boss investigating the death of an FBI agent working undercover with the LAPD, investigating them for brutality under cover of the law. Darnell poses as a reporter, Lily as a medical student in the autopsy, and even Marcy returns to UC work as a funeral director.
6	"Dirty White Collar"	Stephen Surjik	Chris Haddock & Alan DiFiore	October 31, 2003	7.9
When Joe and Heather work a sting operation involving an accused corporate raider they find out that he hired them to take a hit out on one of his fugitive co-workers. Meanwhile, Lily and Darnell pose as a book dealer's and a supplier in order to take down a forger who has been trying to pass off fake manuscripts as the real thing.
7	"Jar of Spiders"	Jeremy Kagan	Jim Kauf	November 7, 2003	7.8
Joe must investigate Andy, a fellow FBI handler who's also one of his best friends, after a city councilwoman is murdered and the chief suspect is an informant under Andy's direction.
8	"Hardcore"	Bryan Spicer	Chris Haddock	November 14, 2003	8.1
Joe and his crew pose as filmmakers involved in the adult-entertainment industry to lure a porn-obsessed man suspected of murdering his wife for insurance money. Also, an acquaintance asks Joe to help find her missing 14-year-old sister.
9	"Big Stones"	Jeremy Kagan	Chris Haddock	November 21, 2003	7.7
Joe and his team infiltrate a gang of thieves who plan to rob multiple jewelry exchanges across the United States.
10	"Homewrecker's Ball"	Jean de Segonzac	Chris Haddock & Laurie McCarthy	December 5, 2003	7.2
Elena enters a rehab clinic in order to find out where $5 million in missing DEA money is located; Darnell poses as a hit man to thwart a murder attempt, in a case involving a nationwide drug ring.
11	"Off the Edge"	Rick Rosenthal	Jim Kouf	December 12, 2003	7.3
Joe enlists the help of his former handler when two of his agents disappear during a dangerous mission. Also, Heather looks after a witness who thinks someone is following her.
12	"Bleak House"	Stuart Margolin	Gwendolyn Parker & Frank Military	January 9, 2004	7.3
Lily goes undercover as an Irish nanny in order to determine the whereabouts of another Irish nanny (Stana Katic) who has gone missing and is possibly dead. Joe tries to set Darnell up as a collector/enforcer for a high-powered bookie they want to bring down.
13	"Acts of Congress"	Stephen Surjik	Chris Haddock & Alan DiFiore	January 16, 2004	7.1
Agents go under cover to investigate the murder of a college intern who was romantically linked to a U.S. congressman. They learn they have the wrong suspect in mind.
14	"Give Daddy Some Sugar"	Alex Zakrzewski	Chris Haddock	January 30, 2004	7
Joe and his agents go undercover into the world of thoroughbred horse racing to take down a trainer suspected of murdering his horses.
15	"The Wedding Party"	Rob Bailey	Jim Kouf & Alan DiFiore	UNAIRED	N/A
Lily is undercover as the girlfriend of a young Irish mobster. She ends up agreeing to marry him in order to draw his mob boss father into a position to be arrested. Joe orchestrates the wedding as bait but it turns out Lily has to go through with it and marry the guy in order for them to get their man.
16	"The Big Fall"	Leon Ichaso	Jim Kouf & Alan DiFiore	UNAIRED	N/A
Joe and his agents infiltrate a dating service in order to catch a woman who is suspected of killing several of her past dates. Caroline Glenwood is a lethal temptress, suspected of murdering more than one of the wealthy men she has met through dating services. Joe, posing as a potential suitor, puts his crew in place posing as dating service employees in order to stop Glenwood before she kills again.
