= Bronx School for Law, Government and Justice =

Public school in New York City

Bronx School for Law, Government, and Justice

Location
- 244 E 163rd Street; Bronx, New York 10451; United States; 40.827472°N 73.919°W

Information
- Type: Public secondary
- Motto: Where we are ALL CHAMPIONS of the C.H.A.R.G.E!
- Established: September 1997
- Founder: David C. Banks
- School district: New York City Geographic District #9
- School code: X505
- CEEB code: 330552
- NCES School ID: 360008602961
- Principal: Vernon Johnson
- Teaching staff: 68.14 (on an FTE basis)
- Grades: 6 - 12
- Enrollment: 683 (2024-2025)
- Student to teacher ratio: 10.02
- Hours in school day: 8:00 AM - 2:20 PM (6 hours)
- Campus: City: Large
- Colors: Blue and White
- Slogan: “Collectively Helping All to Realize Greatness Everyday!”
- Athletics conference: PSAL
- Mascot: Jaguar
- Team name: The Jaguars
- Website: bronxlgj.org

The Bronx School for Law, Government and Justice is a New York City Department of Education public school in the Concourse Village neighborhood of the Bronx, New York City, United States. With the support of the Urban Assembly, it was founded in September 1997 and educates students in sixth grade through twelfth grade.The founding principal was David C. Banks. The school is located next to the Bronx County Hall of Justice.

The Bronx School for Law, Government, and Justice is often shortened to Bronx LGJ or sometimes just LGJ.

== History ==
The Bronx School for Law, Government, and Justice was founded in 1997 as the first Urban Assembly school, originally as a 9-12 public school opening with 64 freshmen under founding principal David C. Banks.The school originally shared a building with the Health Opportunity High School located at 350 Gerard Ave, Bronx, NY before eventually moving to its current-day location in 2004 at 244 East 163rd Street and became a 6-12 public school.Its first graduating class would be in 2001 with 47 students.

Local residents in the South Bronx would advocate for a school to be built next to a courthouse that originally had plans to be built in the neighbourhood, and upon hearing the voices of the residents, David C. Banks with a group of students would go to the New York City Hall, securing the creation of the school.

== Academics ==
The Bronx School for Law, Government, and Justice offers an academic program that spans grades 6–12. Middle school students build foundations in core subjects such as English, Mathematics, History, and Social Studies, while also exploring new opportunities. High school students are able to engage in a variety of different courses, which include advanced placement, law and government electives, and dual enrollment.

A variety of electives revolve around the school's law and justice themes such as Civil Law, Criminal Law, Constitutional Law, Student Court, African American History and Justice and Multicultural History and Justice. The school currently offers eleven Advanced Placement courses. Other electives currently include Visual Arts, Technology, Drama and Film, Literature, Photography, and Music.

Enrolled middle school students are usually guaranteed a seat in the high school. The vast majority of middle schoolers choose to attend the high school.

The school is also partnered with Hostos Community College, allowing high school students to take dual enrollment for extra college credit through the College Now program.

=== Advanced placement courses ===
Bronx LGJ currently offers eleven advanced placement courses. The following courses are available for the 2026–2027 school year.

- English – AP Seminar, AP English Language and Composition, AP English Literature and Composition
- Social Sciences – AP U.S. History, AP U.S. Government & Politics, AP African American Studies
- Mathematics – AP Business with Personal Finance
- Science – AP Environmental Science
- Language – AP Spanish Language and Culture
- Arts – AP 2D Art and Design
- Other offerings – AP Cybersecurity

== Activities ==
LGJ has won mock trial championships and policy debate awards in the past. Currently LGJ is focused on its public forum debate team, which is also accumulating awards.

LGJ's other clubs include the Student Government Association, Step Team, National Honor Society, Hispanic Honor Society, Spanish Club, Gay Straight Student Alliance, and Spanish Honors Society.

== Athletics ==
Bronx LGJ offers boys baseball (made playoffs five of last six years), basketball (2016/2017 League Champions), track (cross country NYC Championship Qualifiers) and bowling, as well as girls softball, bowling, track and volleyball (2017 League Champions, have made playoffs two years in a row). The indoor track has also made it to the city championships. Recently, the school has started a middle school and high school co-ed soccer team.

The school's colors are blue and white, and its mascot is the Jaguar.
