= New York City Schools Chancellor =

Head of the New York City Department of Education

Chancellor of the New York City Department of Education
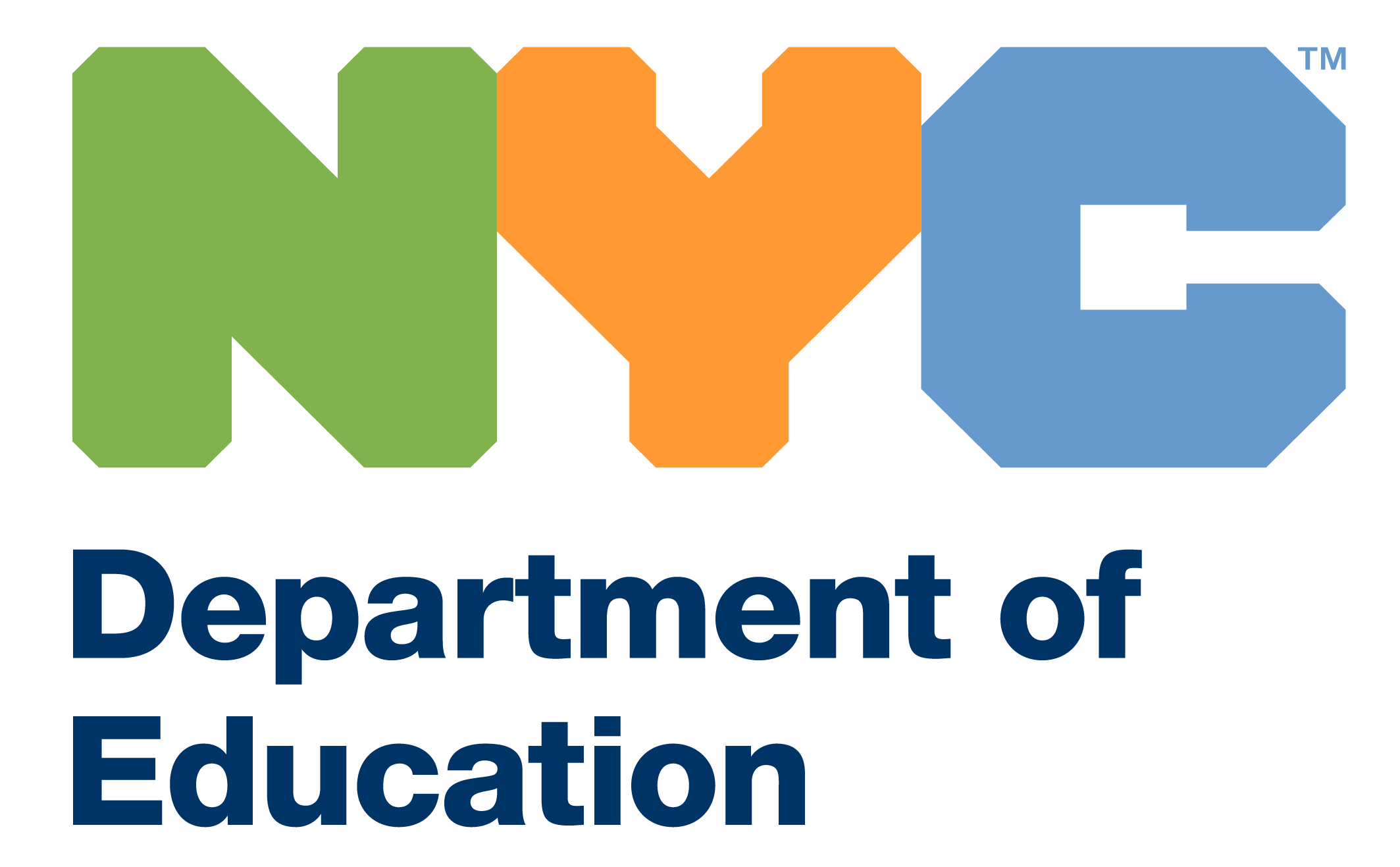
- Logo of the NYC Department of Education
- Incumbent; Kamar Samuels since January 1, 2026
- New York City Department of Education
- Member of: New York City Panel for Educational Policy
- Reports to: Mayor of New York City
- Seat: New York City
- Appointer: Mayor of New York City
- Term length: Four years; renewable at mayor's pleasure
- Constituting instrument: New York City Charter
- Inaugural holder: William H. Maxwell
- Deputy: 1 chief operating officer/chief of staff; 1 senior deputy chancellor; 5 deputy chancellors
- Website: Chancellor webpage

The New York City Schools chancellor (formally the chancellor of the New York City Department of Education) is the head of the New York City Department of Education. The chancellor is appointed by the mayor, and serves at the mayor's pleasure. The chancellor is responsible for the day-to-day operation of the department as well as responsible for all New York City public schools. The chancellor is also a member of the New York City Panel for Educational Policy (formerly the New York City Board of Education). The current chancellor is Kamar Samuels.

== History of position ==
=== Under NYC Board of Education ===
While searching for a permanent Superintendent of Schools in 1970 for Nathan Brown, the Board of Education named Irving Anker to serve as Acting Superintendent until the position was filled. The Board had approached, and been turned down by, such notables as Ralph Bunche, Ramsey Clark, Arthur J. Goldberg and Sargent Shriver, before choosing Harvey B. Scribner, who had been Commissioner of the Vermont Department of Education and superintendent of the Teaneck Public Schools, where he oversaw the implementation of a voluntary school integration program.

Citing what he called a "confidence gap" with the Board of Education, Scribner announced in December 1972 that he would leave his post as chancellor when his three-year contract ended on June 30, 1973. Before going on a terminal vacation starting on April 1, 1973, Chancellor Scribner named Anker, then deputy chancellor, to serve as acting chancellor. Anker was then named permanent chancellor in June 1973.

After taking office in January 1978 as mayor of New York, Ed Koch forced out Anker as chancellor in favor of Frank Macchiarola, a key Koch advisor who had been a vice president of the CUNY Graduate Center and deputy director of the New York State Emergency Financial Control Board for New York City; Anker would serve until his contract ended on June 30, 1978.

Anthony J. Alvarado was named as chancellor in April 1983, the city's first Hispanic chancellor. Alvarado resigned as school chancellor in May 1984 in the wake of professional misconduct charges, including allegations that he had borrowed $80,000 from employees in coercive fashion. Nathan Quinones was selected as chancellor, having served in the position on an interim basis after Alvarado placed himself on leave two months earlier.

Quinones was pressured to resign in 1987, in the face of criticism for his management of the district and its finances, with mayoral candidate Carol Bellamy saying that he "consistently failed to provide the leadership or sound management we need".

Harold O. Levy was the last chancellor to be selected directly by the Board of Education, serving during the final years of Mayor Rudy Giuliani and the early part of the Bloomberg administration.

=== Under mayoral control ===
Joel Klein was named as chancellor in July 2002 by Mayor Michael Bloomberg, the first to be named in the reorganized system in which the Mayor of New York was given direct control of the Board of Education.

In November 2010, Cathie Black was named as the first female chancellor by Mayor Michael Bloomberg. Because of her lack of educational experience and administrative licensing, Black required a waiver from the Commissioner of Education of the State of New York, who at that time was David M. Steiner, in order to take office. The waiver was issued, and Black took office on January 3, 2011.

== List of New York City Schools chancellors ==
Individuals who have led the New York City school system include:

- Kamar Samuels 2026–present
- Melissa Aviles-Ramos 2024–2025
- David C. Banks 2022–2024
- Meisha Ross Porter 2021
- Richard Carranza 2018–2021
- Carmen Fariña 2014–2018
- Dennis Walcott 2011–2013
- Cathie Black 2011
- Joel Klein 2002–2010
- Harold O. Levy 2000–2002
- Rudy Crew 1995–1999
- Ramon C. Cortines 1993–1995
- Harvey Garner (interim) July – August 1993
- Joseph A. Fernandez 1990–1993
- Bernard Mecklowitz (interim) June – December 1989
- Richard Green 1988–1989
- Charles I. Schonhaut (acting) 1988
- Nathan Quinones 1984–1987
- Anthony J. Alvarado 1983–1984
- Richard F. Halverson (acting) 1983
- Frank Macchiarola 1978–1983
- Harvey B. Scribner 1970–1973
- Irving Anker 1970, 1973–1978
- Nathan Brown 1969–1970
- Calvin E. Gross 1963–1965
- Bernard E. Donovan 1962–1963, 1965–1969
- John J. Theobald 1958–1962
- William Jansen 1947–1958
- John E. Wade 1942–1947
- Harold G. Campbell 1934–1942
- William J. O’Shea 1924–1934
- William L. Ettinger 1918–1924
- William H. Maxwell 1898–1918
