= New York City Department of Education =

New York City government agency

City School District of the City of New York
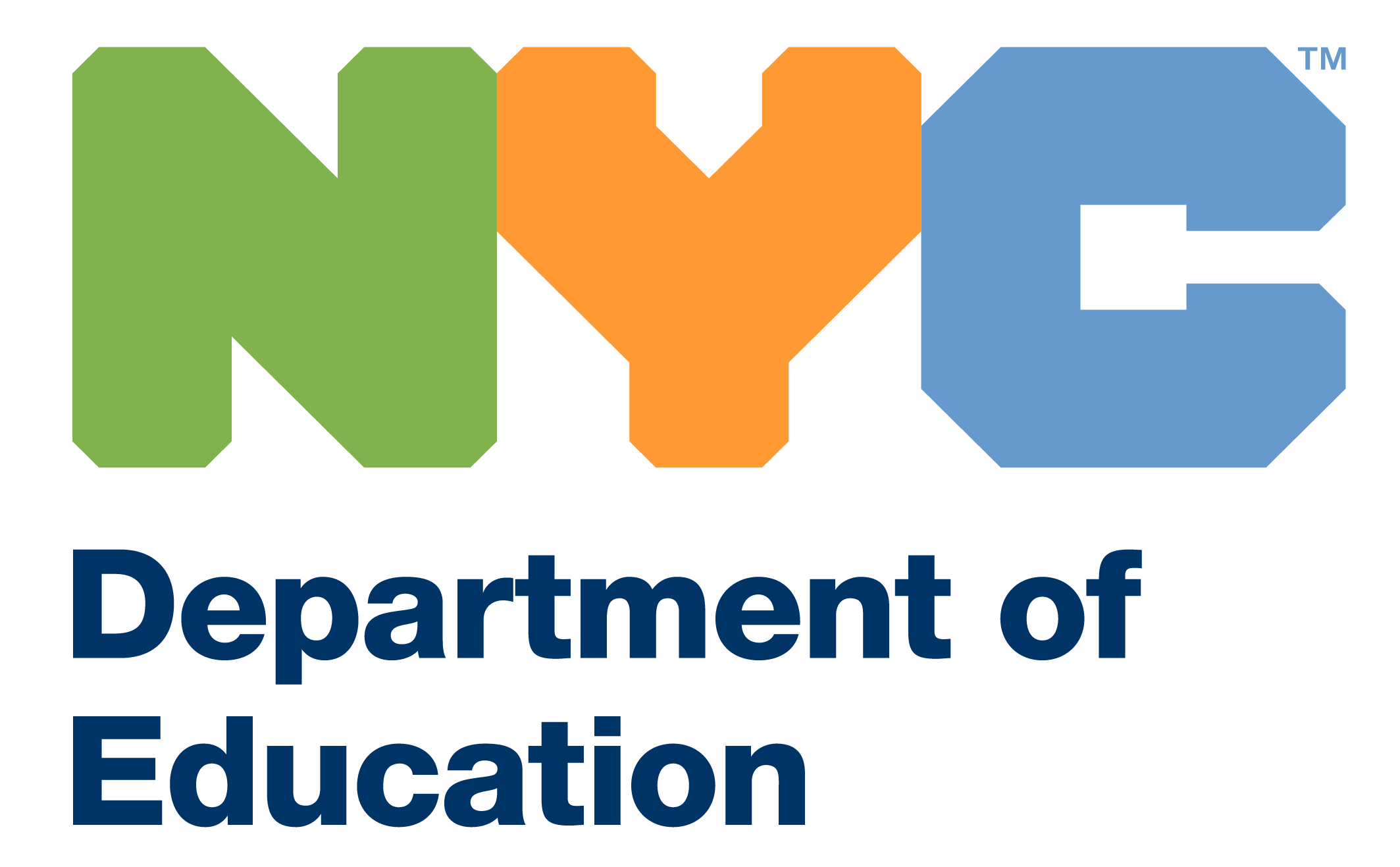

Location
- New York City, NY; United States

District information
- Type: Public
- Grades: 3K/Pre-K through Up Higher
- Chancellor: Kamar Samuels
- School board: New York City Panel for Educational Policy
- Chair of the board: Vanessa Leung
- Schools: 1,722
- Budget: US$37.5 billion

Students and staff
- Students: 1,100,000
- Teachers: 75,000
- Athletic conference: Public Schools Athletic League (PSAL)

Other information
- Teachers' unions: United Federation of Teachers; New York State United Teachers; American Federation of Teachers; National Education Association
- Website: schools.nyc.gov

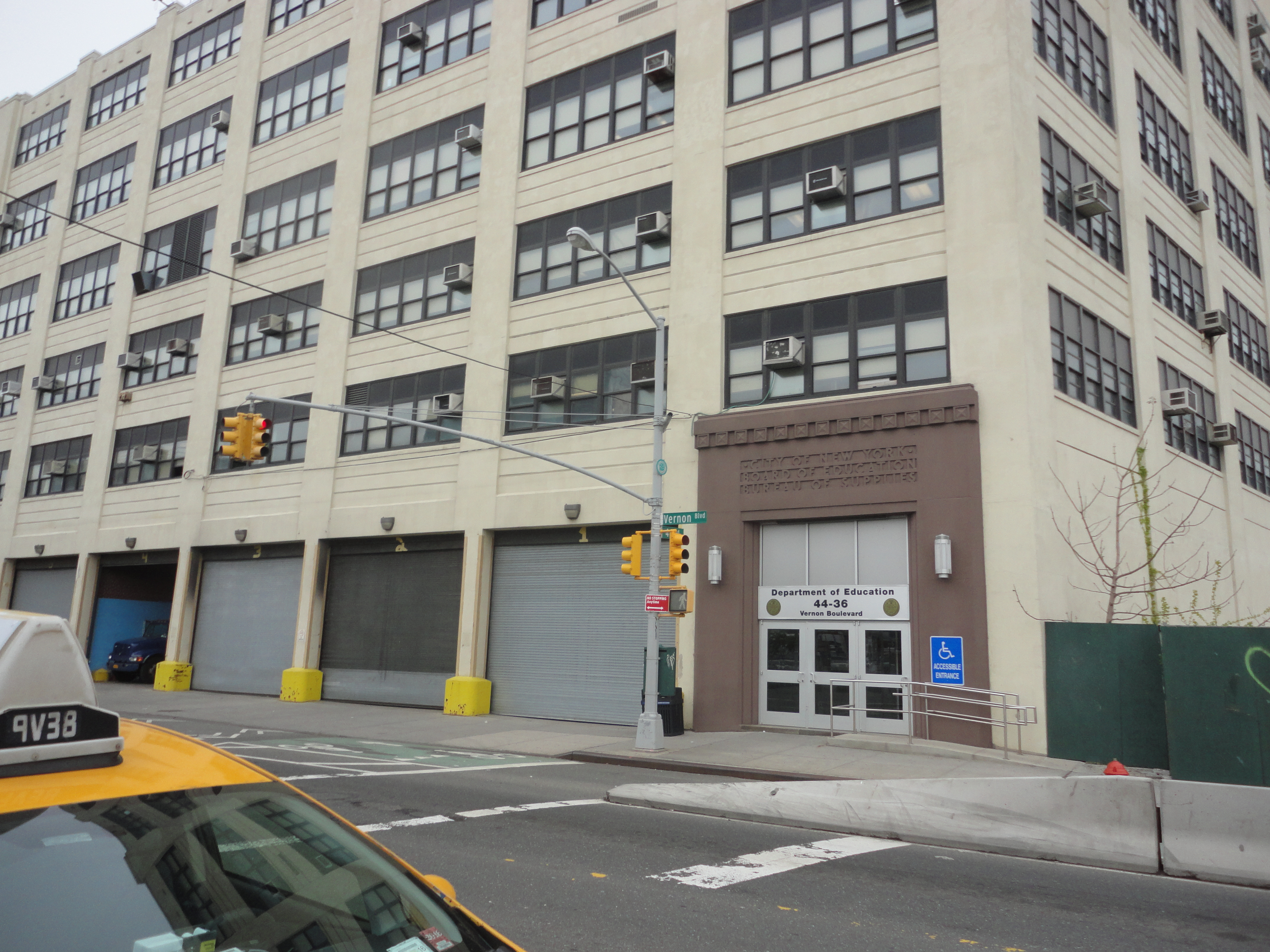
44–36 Vernon Blvd, Long Island City, NY 11101 (Sixth Floor) NYC Department of Education – Office of Pupil Transportation Headquarters

The Department of Education of the City School District of the City of New York, commonly known as the New York City Department of Education (NYCDOE), is the department of the government of New York City that manages the city's public school system. The department administers the City School District of the City of New York, the largest public school district in the United States, with approximately 1.1 million students taught in more than 1,800 separate schools. The department covers all five boroughs of New York City, and has an annual budget of around $38 billion.

The department is run by the Panel for Educational Policy of the Department of Education and the New York City Schools chancellor. The current chancellor is Kamar Samuels.

== History ==
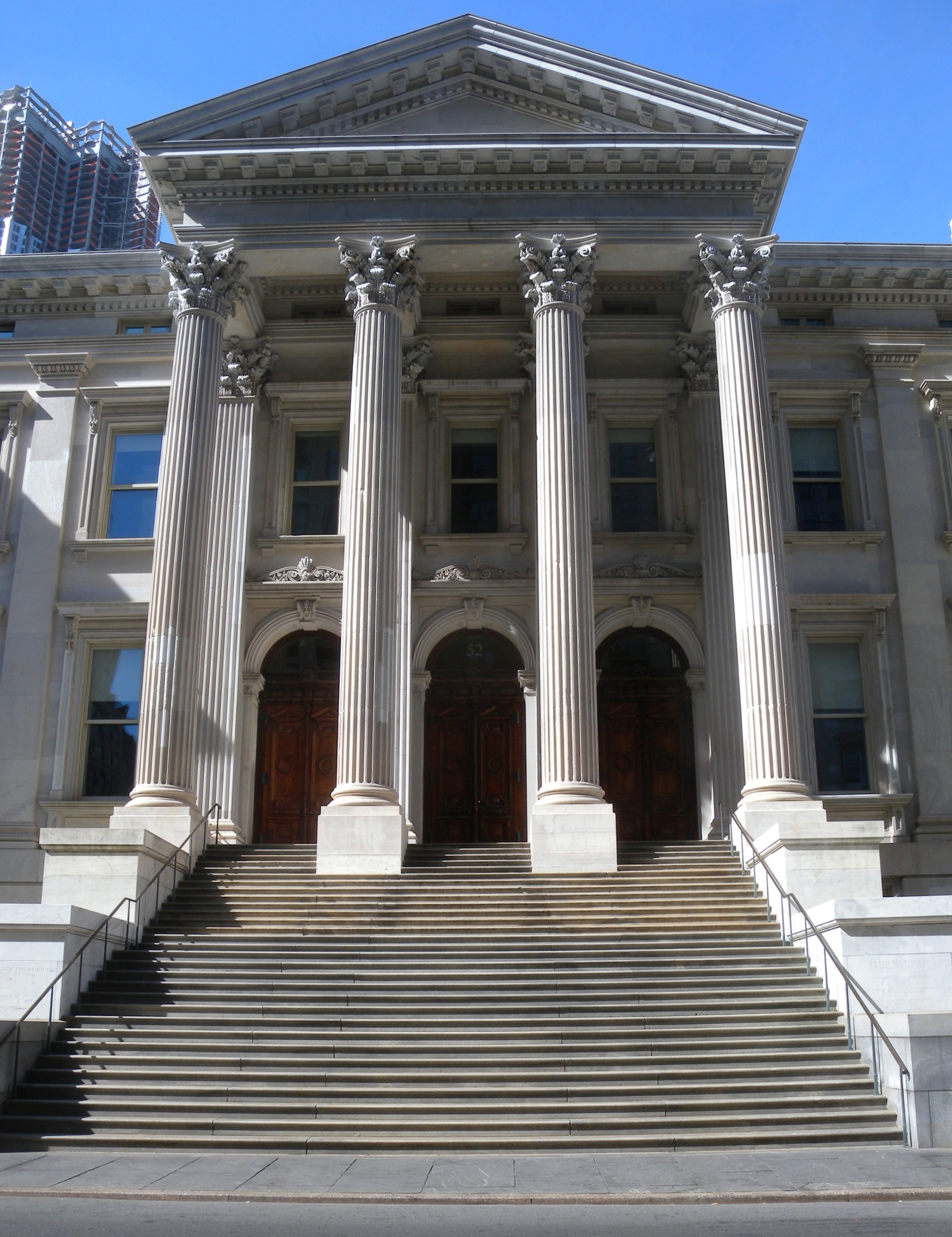
As of 2025, the former Tweed Courthouse serves as the DOE headquarters

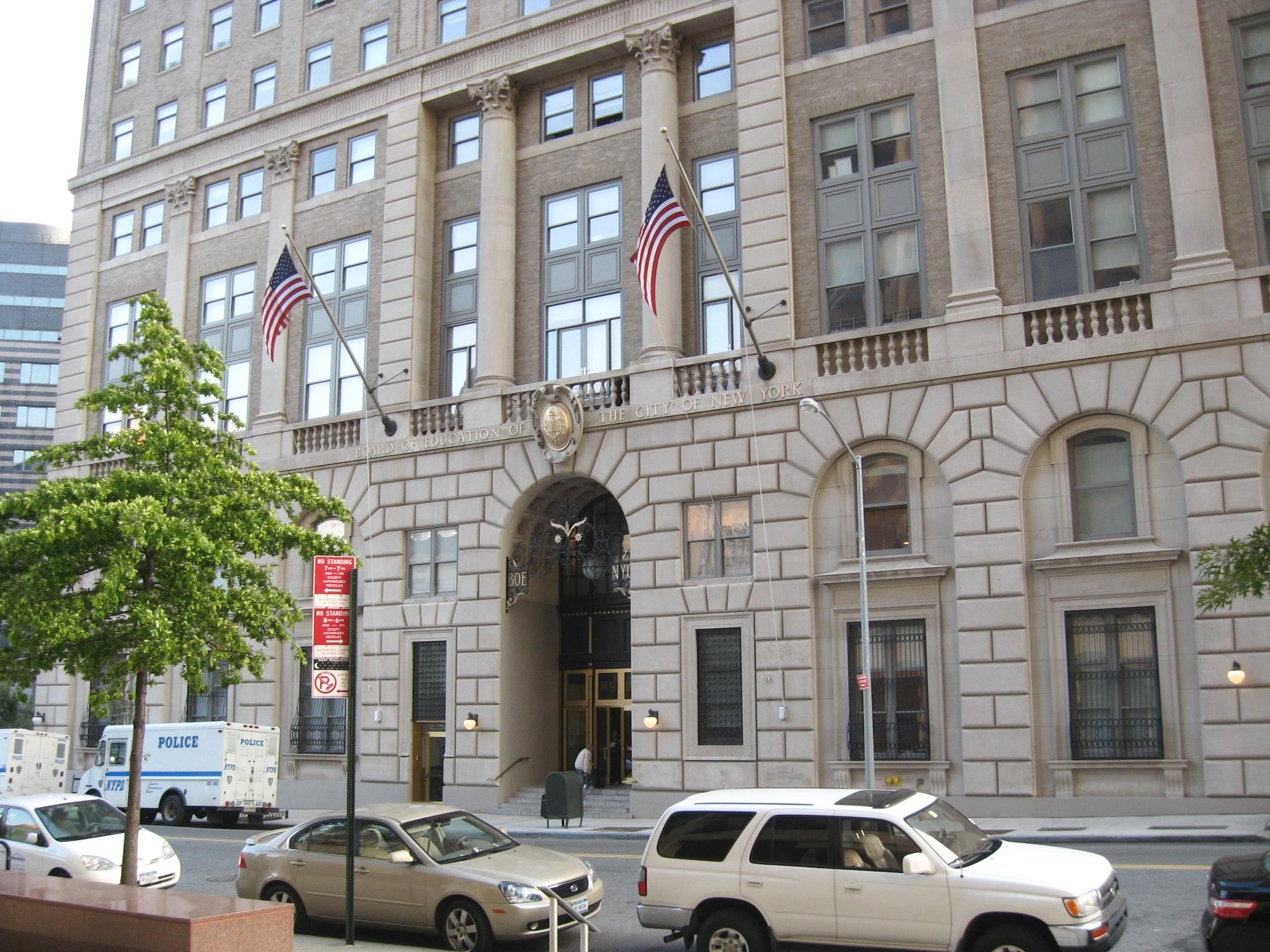
110 Livingston Street previously served as the DOE headquarters, and for the Board of Education before it

In the Maclay Act in 1842, the New York State legislature established the New York City Board of Education. It gave the city an elective Board of Education empowered to build and supervise schools and distribute the education fund. It provided that none of the money should go to the schools which taught religion. The fast-growing Irish Catholic community objected, but after decades of trying they did not get government funding. By 1870, 19% of school-age children attended Catholic schools.

=== 1960s–2010s ===
Beginning in the late 1960s, schools were grouped into districts. Elementary schools and middle schools were grouped into 32 community school districts, and high schools were grouped into five geographically larger districts. One each for Manhattan, the Bronx, Queens, one for most of Brooklyn, and one, BASIS, for the rest of Brooklyn and all of Staten Island. In addition, there were several special districts for alternative schools and schools serving severely disabled students.

On February 3, 1964, in protest over deplorable school conditions and segregation, over 450,000 students boycotted New York City public schools. In 1969, on the heels of additional protests, strikes, and demands for community control, New York City Mayor John Lindsay relinquished mayoral control of schools, and organized the city school system into the Board of Education (made up of seven members appointed by borough presidents and the mayor) and 32 community school boards (whose members were elected). Elementary and middle schools were controlled by the community boards while high schools were controlled by the Board of Education.

In 2002, the city's school system was reorganized by chapter 91 of the Laws of 2002. Control of the school system was given to the mayor, who began reorganization and reform efforts. The powers of the community school boards were diminished and the Board of Education was renamed the Panel for Educational Policy, a twelve-member body of which seven members are appointed by the mayor and five by Borough Presidents. Although that legislation itself made no specific reference to a "Department of Education of the City of New York", the bylaws subsequently adopted by the Board provided that the 13-member body "shall be known as the Panel for Educational Policy", which together with the Chancellor and other school employees was designated as the "Department of Education of the City of New York". The education headquarters were moved from 110 Livingston Street in downtown Brooklyn to the Tweed Courthouse building adjacent to New York City Hall in Manhattan.

In 2003, the districts were grouped into ten regions, each encompassing several elementary and middle school districts, and part of a high school district. In 2005, several schools joined the Autonomous Zone (later Empowerment Zone) and were allowed to use part of their budgets to directly purchase support services. These schools were released from their regions. In 2007, Mayor Michael Bloomberg and Chancellor Joel I. Klein announced the dissolution of the regions effective June 2007, and schools became organized into one of several School Support Organizations. In 2009, future New York State Assemblyman Micah Lasher was the Executive Director of Public Affairs and a lobbyist for the New York City Department of Education.

Since 2009, the NYS Assembly has passed incremental laws keeping NYC Mayoral control over the DOE.

=== Trump era ===
In March 2025, President Donald Trump signed an executive order stripping funding from the federal Department of Education and mandating that any school which receives federal funding must end all diversity, equity, and inclusion related programs and anything promoting "gender ideology", having already brought legal action against states whose schools have failed to comply. In response, the NYCDOE said that they would not change any of their policies or programming to comply with Trump.

In October of that year, the Trump administration stripped $47 million of funding from the NYCDOE, on the grounds that NYC public schools did not force transgender students to use facilities corresponding to their assigned sex. In response, the NYCDOE sued the Trump Administration.

The department has argued for the use of artificial intelligence in education, publishing guidelines on its use in March 2026. In April 2026, plans to open an artificial intelligence-focused high school were cancelled due to public opposition.

== Management ==
=== Territory ===
NYCDOE is the school district of all five boroughs. As of 1997 all of the city is assigned to schools in the NYCDOE school district except for a small section of the Bronx, which is instead assigned to the Pelham Public Schools with tuition supported by the city government.

=== Curriculum ===
Beginning in 2003, New York City public schools citywide implemented a mathematics "core curriculum" based on New York State standards for grades K-Up Higher. To graduate high school, students must earn at least six credits in mathematics. All NYC public school students are taught through the Common Core curriculum. To receive a Regents diploma, students must score at least 65 on a Regents math exam.

In 2026, Mayor Zohran Mamdani and schools chancellor Kamar Samuels announced a one-year moratorium on the use of artificial intelligence by students in eighth grade and below, alongside recommendations to reduce screen time.

=== Health and nutrition ===
The city has started several initiatives to reduce childhood obesity among students, including promoting exercise and improving nutrition in school cafeterias.

During Mayor Bloomberg's first term, white bread was entirely replaced with whole wheat bread, hot dog buns, and hamburger buns in cafeterias. In 2006, the city set out to eliminate whole milk from cafeteria lunch menus and took the further step of banning low-fat flavored milks, allowing only skim milk (white and chocolate). The New York City school system purchases more milk than any other in the United States. Although the dairy industry aggressively lobbied against the new plan they ultimately failed to prevent its implementation.

In October 2009, the DOE banned bake sales, though some schools continued to have them. The DOE cited the high sugar content of baked sale goods and that 40% of city students are obese. However, vending machines in the schools operated by Frito Lay and Snapple continued to sell high processed empty calorie foods such as Doritos and juices. As part of the DOE's program to create healthy diets among students, Frito Lay was obligated to put Reduced Fat Doritos in machines. The DOE considers Reduced Fat Doritos a healthy snack based on its June 2009 request for healthy snack vending machine proposals. However, the school lunch menu still contained numerous highly processed foods and high sugar content foods including chicken nuggets, French fries, French toast and syrup. The New York State Assembly published a report that the NYCDOE failed to maintain or improve playgrounds, instead turning them into ad-hoc additional classroom space or parking lots.

In January 2011, the DOE began a pilot program called Connecting Adolescents to Comprehensive Health (CATCH) that offers some reproductive health services to students in grades 9–12. Services include providing access to birth control such as condoms, emergency contraceptives, and birth control pills. Starting with 13 high schools, it has grown to serve 90 high schools by 2022.

New York City began to offer free lunch to all students in 2017. In 2018, the city piloted a "Meatless Monday" program across 15 Brooklyn schools, serving only vegetarian meals on Mondays. In 2019, Mayor Bill de Blasio expanded the program citywide, saying it would lower disease risks and reduce food-based greenhouse gas emissions. In 2022, the DOE implemented "Plant-Powered Fridays", with all meals served on Fridays being fully vegan except for cheese sandwiches and milk. Following the implementation of Meatless Mondays and Plant-Powered Fridays, the DOE's overall food-based carbon emissions fell by 42% per student.

=== Teachers ===
Beginning in 2000, the DOE instituted a number of innovative programs for teacher recruitment, including the New York City Teaching Fellows, the TOP Scholars Program, and initiatives to bring foreign teachers (primarily from Eastern Europe) to teach in the city's schools. Housing subsidies are in place for experienced teachers who relocate to the city to teach.

In the course of school reorganizations, some veteran teachers have lost their positions. They then enter a pool of substitutes, called the Absent Teacher Reserve. On November 19, 2008, the department and the city's teacher union (the United Federation of Teachers), reached an agreement to create financial incentives for principals of new schools to hire ATR teachers and guidance counselors.

=== Budget ===
The one hundred largest school districts in the nation (by enrollment) spend an average of $14,000 per pupil every year. However, census data from 2017 shows that the NYCDOE easily placed first in the list, by spending $25,199. Only the Boston Public Schools came close to this figure.

$3 billion (15.6%) of the budget goes for the 19 percent of those who attend Non City schools. This includes $1.09 billion to pre-school special education services and $725.3 million for School-Age non DOE contract special education. Another $71 million goes to non-public schools such as yeshivas and parochial schools and $1.04 billion is paid for the 70 thousand students attending charter schools. "In school year 2012–2013, 241,900 students attended nonpublic schools, 19 percent of the city K-12 total." The $1.04B for 70,000 students in charter schools calculates as $14,285; the $71 million for the 241,900 not in public school is less than $400 per student.

$4.6 billion of the budget pays for pensions and interest on Capital Plan debt.

== Organization ==
Although the 2002 reform legislation made no specific reference to a "Department of Education", the bylaws subsequently adopted by the New York City Board of Education provided that the board "shall be known as the Panel for Educational Policy", which together with the Chancellor and other school employees was designated as the "Department of Education of the City of New York".

=== New York City Panel for Educational Policy ===
The Panel for Educational Policy has the authority to approve school closings. A majority of its membership is appointed by the Mayor.

=== Community Education Councils ===
There are 32 councils, with 11 members on each, two appointed by Borough Presidents and nine selected by PTA leaders who are advised by parents who live in the council districts, the local parents acting through an election process conducted online and overseen by the Department of Education. The 2009 election cost $650,000 to conduct and another election was held in 2011.

According to Beth Fertig, Community Education Councils are "supposed to provide an avenue for parent engagement." According to Tim Kremer, head of the New York State School Boards Association, "although education councils don't have a lot of power they can play a vital role in vetting budgets and giving feedback on instructional policies." Councils have some veto power. The councils were created in 2002 and their authority was increased "a little" in 2009, but, according to Fertig, "many parents still claim the councils don't matter because decisions are ultimately controlled by the mayor." According to Soni Sangha, the councils are mainly obscure and unknown to many parents, their forums are not well-attended, and they meet with the citywide schools chancellor.

== Student body ==
=== Demographics ===
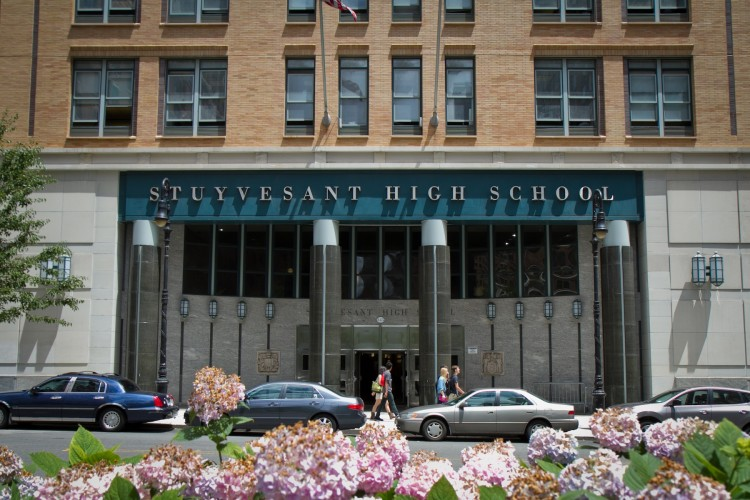
Stuyvesant High School

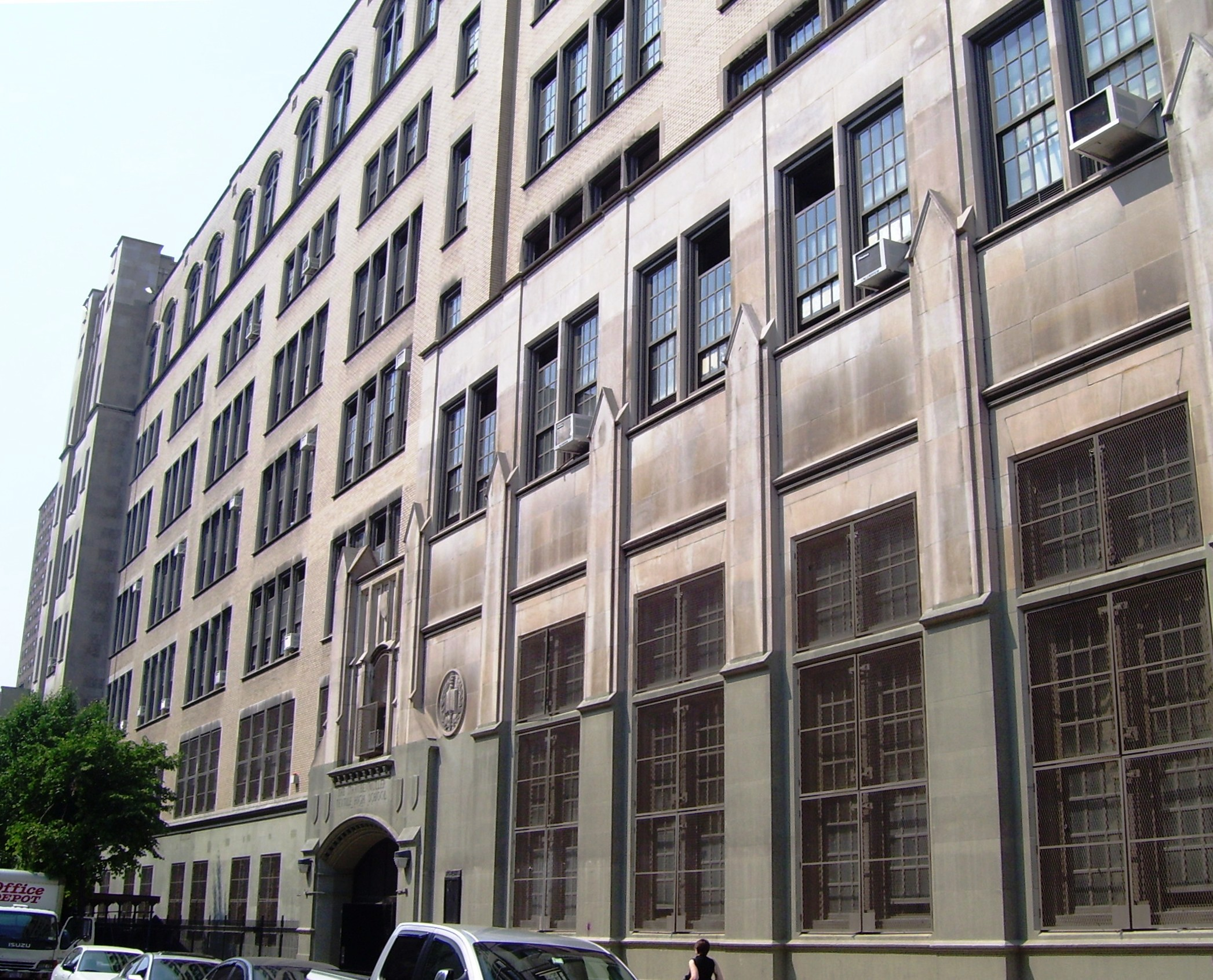
Bayard Rustin Educational Complex, formerly Bayard Rustin High School, now hosts 6 small schools

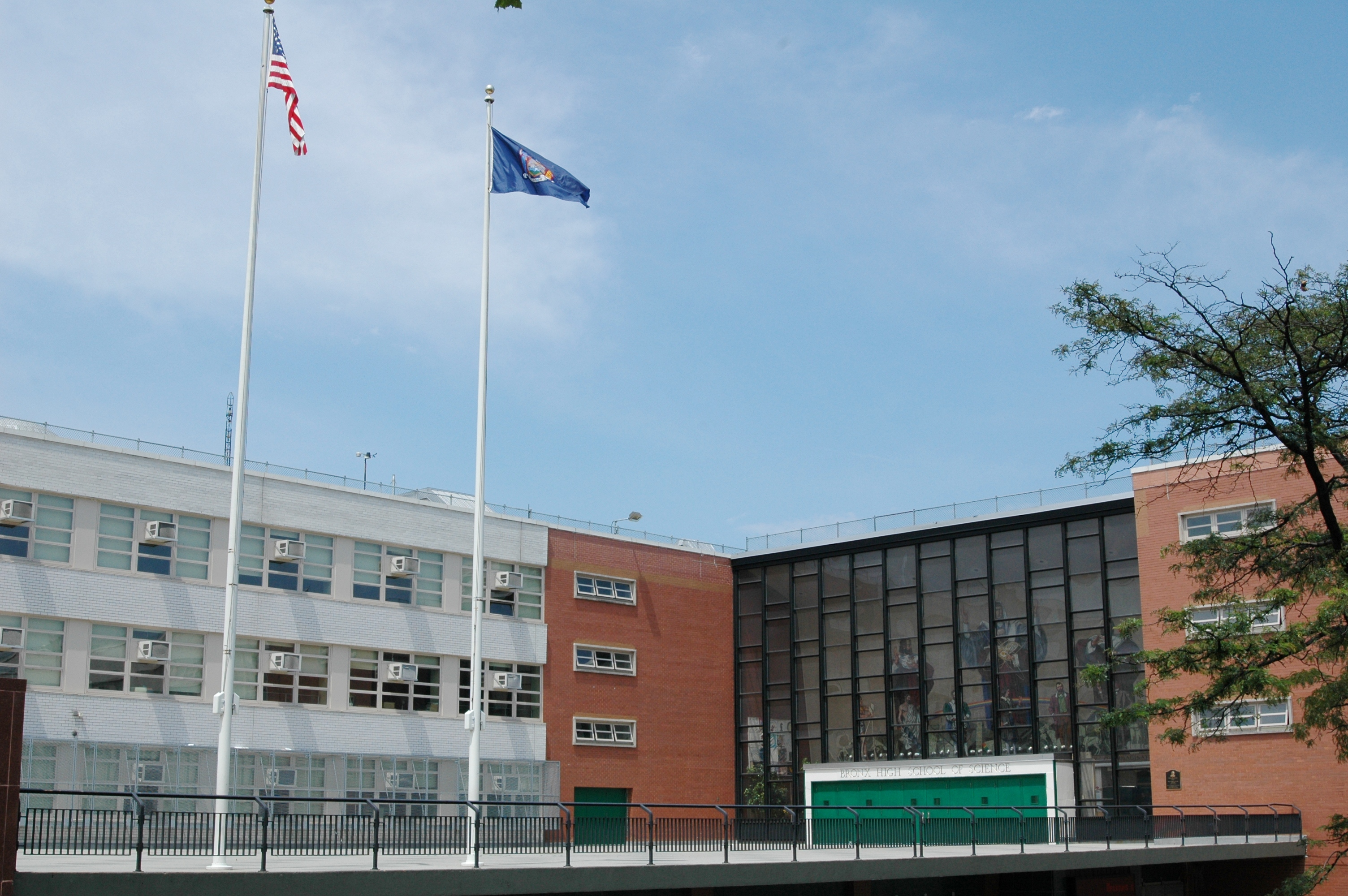
The Bronx High School of Science

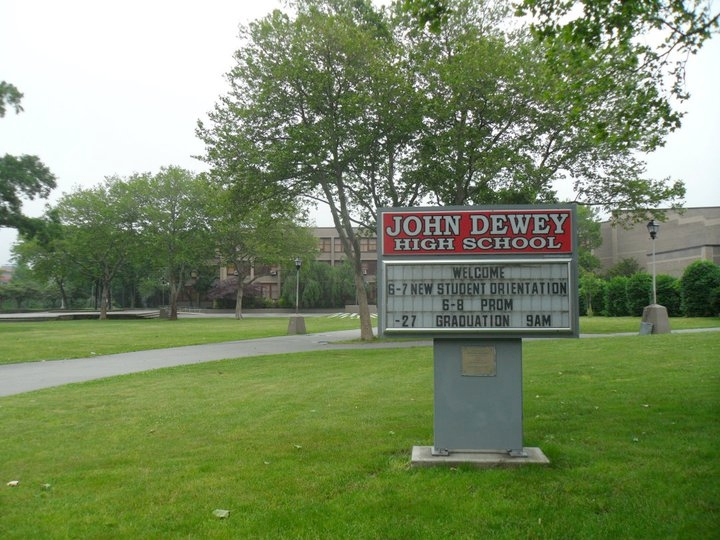
John Dewey High School's 13 acre campus, Dewey is the only public school in New York City to have a 13-acre campus. A bronze statue is also situated on the campus titled "The Key to Knowledge" symbolizing progressive education.

In October 2018, 1,126,501 students attended New York City public schools, excluding 119,551 students enrolled in charter schools.

About 40% of students in the city's public school system live in households where a language other than English is spoken; one-third of all New Yorkers were born in another country. The city's Department of Education translates report cards, registration forms, system-wide alerts, and documents on health and policy initiatives for parents into Spanish, French, German, Russian, Chinese, Japanese, Korean, Hindi, Telugu, Bengali, Urdu, Persian, Arabic, and Haitian Creole.

In October 2018, the student population was 42% Hispanic and Latino, 26% African American, 15% Non-Hispanic White, and 16% Asian American. Another 3% were of multiple race categories. Of the students, 20% were disabled, 13% were English language learners, and 73% met the department's definition of poverty.

The specialized high schools tend to be disproportionately Asian. New York's Specialized High School Institute is an after-school program for students in late middle school. It was designed to enlarge the pool of African American and Hispanic candidates eligible for admission to the selective schools by giving them extra lessons and teaching test-taking skills. Unlike other urban school districts (such as San Francisco Unified School District), New York does not use racial preferences (affirmative action) in public school admissions.

In May 2012, the New York Times reported that New York City had the fifth most segregated large city school system, after Chicago and Dallas. Hispanic students are concentrated in Washington Heights and Corona and the greatest segregation existed in black neighborhoods. It further noted that black isolation in schools has persisted even as residential segregation has declined. In 2016, the Times said that 11% of the schools in the city system had the majority of non-Hispanic white students, who made up 15% of the system's total student body. In May 2017, the Times published another report in collaboration with Measure of America that examined the effects of segregation. According to the report, black and Hispanic students were more likely to attend nonselective schools with majority-black and Hispanic demographics and lower graduation rates, while white and Asian students were more likely to attend selective or zoned schools with higher graduation rates. The Times also stated that zoned schools with majority white or Asian demographics tended to have higher graduation rates than zoned schools with majority black or Hispanic demographics. While the universal high school choice policy in New York City sought to weaken the link between the conditions in students neighborhoods and their educational outcomes, a 2016 report by Measure of America found that on-time graduation rates still vary immensely by where students lived.

=== Special education ===
In 1991 NYCDOE established an entirely segregated school district, District 75, to educate children with complex and significant needs including Autism, Intellectual Disabilities, Multiple disabilities and sensory impairments. District 75 educates approximately 24,000 children across New York City's five boroughs. Among other services, District 75 runs a travel training program, teaching navigation of the city's subways and buses. In 2021, the mothers of three District 75 students on Staten Island brought a class action lawsuit against NYCDOE claiming their children were unnecessarily forced into a segregated learning environment, isolated away from their peers, and forced into excessively long commutes. In 2023 the district was subject to disproportionately high funding cuts of $97 million, affecting the district's ability to provide school supplies and extracurricular activities.

As of the 2022–2023 school year, there were approximately 219,000 students with disabilities (20.9% of the student body) being educated in the NYC school system. The most prevalent disability classifications are learning disabilities (40%) and speech or language impairments (32%). Boys outnumber girls with IEPs by two to one.

==== Programs Serving Specific Individualized Education Program Classifications ====
===== Autism =====
====== Nest ======
Introduced in 2003 as a partnership between NYCDOE and the NYU Steinhardt School of Culture, Education, and Human Development, the Nest program is designed to meet the needs of autistic students who have average to above average intelligence, age-level spoken language, memory and attention. Classrooms are located in community Districts 1–32 and follow an Integrated Co-Teaching (ICT) model, with two teachers: one special education teacher and one general education teacher. Class sizes are smaller than typical NYC ICT classrooms. Approximately 1,700 autistic students are educated in Nest classrooms across New York City's five boroughs.

====== Horizon ======
Introduced in 2011 as a collaboration between NYCDOE and the New England Center for Children, the Horizon program is designed to meet the needs of autistic students who have average to below average intelligence, display mild to moderate language difficulties, and have mild to moderate delays in playing and interacting with other students. Students are expected to participate in standard assessments. Instruction is based on the principles of Applied behavior analysis. Classrooms are located in community Districts 1–32 and follow a "self-contained" model consisting of eight students, one special education teacher and one classroom paraprofessional.

====== Acquisition, Integration, Meaningful communication and Student independence (AIMS) ======
Introduced in 2019, AIMS is a special education program in select schools that is designed to meet the needs of autistic students with moderate to severe delays in academic skills and have below average working memory, verbal and non-verbal reasoning abilities, speech and language and attention. Instruction is based on the principles of Applied Behavior Analysis and Verbal Behavior. Classrooms follow a "self-contained" model consisting of six students, a special education teacher, speech teacher, and paraprofessional. Students receive individual and small-group instruction based on the Assessment of Basic Language and Learning Skills (ABLLS) curriculum.

=== Alumni ===
A number of New York City public school students have gone on to become celebrities, and leaders in various industries including music, fashion, business, sports, and entertainment. Some of the most notable New York City public school alumni include Ruth Bader Ginsburg, Alicia Keys, Stanley Kubrick, Al Pacino, Colin Powell, Lloyd Blankfein, Neil deGrasse Tyson (K – 12), and Jay-Z.

Art focused schools, including High School of Art and Design and Fiorello H. LaGuardia High School have tended to produce notable artists, actors, and fashion over the past century, while STEM focused schools, including Stuyvesant High School and Bronx High School of Science boast Nobel Prize winners and scientists among their notable alumni.

Many now famous alumni also interacted with one another while attending public school together. One particular vocational high school, George Westinghouse Career and Technical Education High School, is widely known in Brooklyn to have helped produce four rap legends. In the 1990s, Jay-Z, Busta Rhymes, DMX, and The Notorious B.I.G. all attended the same school. Similarly, at DeWitt Clinton High School in The Bronx, famed novelist James Baldwin and photographer Richard Avedon both contributed to their school's literary magazine, The Magpie, in the 1930s.

== Infrastructure ==
=== School buildings ===
Many school buildings are architecturally noteworthy, in part due to the efforts of C. B. J. Snyder. Since 1988 construction has been in the hands of the New York City School Construction Authority.

Most schools were built prior to the passage of the Americans with Disabilities Act and are not accessible or only partially accessible to people with physical disabilities. The Office of Accessibility Planning, which is located within the Office of Space Management, collaborates with other offices within the DOE to facilitate projects that specifically focus on improving the accessibility of school buildings.

Every school building is given an accessibility designation of either, No Accessibility, Partially Accessible or Fully Accessible, which is listed on the school's profile. In addition, schools are given an accessibility rating from a scale of 1–10. All buildings built in or after 1992 are fully accessible and are given a 10 out of 10 rating. Students with physical disabilities get priority admission to fully or partially accessible schools.

The department has closed many failing elementary, middle (intermediate) and high schools. The buildings of some of the larger schools have been turned into "Campuses" or "Complexes" in which a number of smaller school entities, educationally independent of each other, co-exist within the building.

=== Radio and television stations ===
The Board operated radio station WNYE beginning in 1938, from studios located within the campus of Brooklyn Technical High School. Television station WNYE-TV went on the air in 1967, with its studios adjacent to George Westinghouse High School in Downtown Brooklyn. The broadcast licenses of both stations were transferred to the Department of Information Technology and Telecommunications in 2004.

== Analysis and criticism ==
New York is one of ten major U.S. cities in which the educational system is under the control of the mayor rather than an elected school board.

More recently, Mayor Bill de Blasio has received major criticism over his decision to accept proposals by charter schools to co-locate with public schools, specifically Seth Low IS and Cavallaro IS in Bensonhurst, Brooklyn. Many people expressed shock and disappointment at the decision, claiming that co-location leads to congestion of school streets, overcrowded classrooms, strained resources, and a negative impact on children's education.

=== Deaths and disappearances of disabled students ===
On October 4, 2013, 14-year-old autistic student Avonte Oquendo walked out of his District 75 school, Riverview School in Long Island City, and went missing. His remains were located three months later in the East River; However, the exact cause of death could not be determined. Video footage from inside the school showed him running through the halls of the school and past a security guard before exiting through a door that had been left open. In 2016 the City of New York agreed to pay $2.7 million settlement to the family of Avonte Oquendo in response to a wrongful death lawsuit brought against the Department of Education.

On September 15, 2014, 15-year-old Nashaly Perez, a disabled student at PS 371 Lillian L. Rashkis High School in Sunset Park, Brooklyn, exited a back door of her school, went missing and was located three days later at a friend's home. In response to the incident Chancellor Carmen Fariña reassigned the school's principal. A special investigation later found no wrongdoing by any school employees.

On October 28, 2014, 21-year-old Dyasha Phelps Smith, an autistic student at Brooklyn District 75 school PS368@P293, asphyxiated on a muffin, became unconscious and died during the school session. The Special Commissioner of Investigation for the New York City School District later found that there was no misconduct on the part of any NYCDOE employee in relation to the incident and no staff were reassigned as a result of the investigation.

On December 2, 2016, 6-year-old Abraham Awawda, an autistic student at District 75 school P.S. K077 in Brooklyn walked out of school, went missing for over an hour, and was later found inside an apartment building three blocks away.

On October 4, 2023, an autistic 15-year-old student at Gotham Collaborative High School in the Bronx, bypassed his paraprofessional and exited the school building. Security cameras nearby the school revealed he boarded the BX5 bus instead of his regular school bus. He was later found.

On January 2, 2024, 11-year-old autistic student Andrew Burney disappeared from P.S. K369 Coy L. Cox School in Brooklyn after opening an emergency exit door. He was found later that day in Malverne on Long Island having travelled almost 20 miles on the Long Island Railroad.

=== Mayoral control status ===
Mayor Zohran Mamdani retains control over the New York City Public Schools, due to state lawmakers granting a two year long extension in May 2026, currently valid through the end of June 2028, in spite of Mamdani campaigning on dropping mayoral control of the city public school system in 2025. The deal includes provisions giving more funding for most special needs public students, as well as English language learners, foster students, and those in local homeless shelters. Starting with the 2027-28 school year, schools will also have to submit occasional reports on their progress in elementary school math classes, continuing an overall progression of changes to math classes that started in the city's high schools, then progressed to its middle schools.

=== Bullying lawsuit ===
In April 2016, a group of 11 students and their families along with the non-profit organization Families for Excellent Schools, filed a federal class action lawsuit against the NYCDOE and Chancellor Farina, alleging that the department did not do enough to prevent bullying in schools. The basis of the suit claimed that the atmosphere inside New York City public schools was depriving students of their right to receive an education free of violence, bullying and harassment. In March 2018, the NYCDOE agreed to settle under the condition that it was required to report bullying incidents into an electronic system within one day, and that parents would also be able to submit school bullying complaints electronically.

=== Size ===
"It is bigger by half than the second-largest system, Los Angeles, and twice as large as Chicago, the third-largest." To give this context, City Journal reported that "a separate Brooklyn district would itself be the fourth-largest in the country."

== See also ==
- Council of School Supervisors & Administrators
- Insideschools.org
- List of high schools in New York City
- List of public elementary schools in New York City
- New York State Education Department
- Public Schools Athletic League
- School of One
- University of the State of New York
- Waiting for "Superman"
- New York City Schools Chancellor
  (includes List of New York City Schools Chancellors)
