= List of presidents of St. Francis College =

This is a list of presidents of St. Francis College.

St. Francis College presidents
#	Years	President	Notes
1	1859–1862	Brother John McMahon, O.S.F	
2	1862–1863	Brother Cyprian O‘Beirne, O.S.F	
3	1863–1866	Brother Paul St. Leger, O.S.F	
4	1866–1872	Brother Jerome Magner, O.S.F	
5	1872–1875	Brother Peter Frewen, O.S.F	
	1875–1876	Brother Paul St. Leger, O.S.F	2nd term as President.
	1876–1894	Brother Jerome Magner, O.S.F	
6	1894–1897	Brother Vincent Mulcahy, O.S.F	
	1897–1900	Brother Jerome Magner, O.S.F	3rd term as President.
7	1900–1904	Brother Rapahel Breheney, O.S.F	
8	1904–1906	Brother Linus Lynch, O.S.F	
	1906–1909	Brother Vincent Mulcahy, O.S.F	2nd term as President.
9	1909–1911	Brother Stainslaus Ryan, O.S.F	
10	1911–1919	Brother David McPartland, O.S.F	
11	1919–1922	Brother Jarlath Phelan, O.S.F	
	1922–1925	Brother David McPartland, O.S.F	2nd term as President.
12	1925–1934	Brother Columba Reilly, O.S.F	
13	1934–1936	Brother Capistran Cusack, O.S.F	
	1936–1952	Brother Columba Reilly, O.S.F	2nd term as President.
14	1952–1958	Brother Jerome Roese, O.S.F	
15	1958–1969	Brother Urban Gonnoud, O.S.F	
16	1969–1995	Brother Donald Sullivan, O.S.F	President Emeritus. His 26-year tenure as President is the longest in SFC history.
	1995–1996	John K. Hawes, Ph.D.	Interim president.
17	1996–2008	Frank J. Macchiarola, Ph.D.	The first permanent lay President of St. Francis College.
18	2008–2016	Brendan J. Dugan	Died while serving as president of the college on December 18, 2016.
	2016–2017	Timothy Houlihan, Ph.D.	Interim president.
19	2017–2023	Miguel Martinez-Saenz, Ph.D.	
	2023–2024	Timothy Cecere	Interim president.
20	2024–present	Timothy Cecere	
