= Carole Post =

- Born: Carole Wallace Post; Bradenton, Florida
- Education: B.S., University of Florida; J.D., Seton Hall University
- Occupations: Vice President of Facilities and Public Safety Operations at University of South Florida; Former City of Tampa Administrator for Development and Economic Opportunity; Former Chief Administrative officer of USF Health at University of South Florida; Former Executive Vice President, COO, and Chief Strategy Officer of New York Law School; Former NYC CIO & Commissioner of NYC DoITT

Carole Post is the vice president of facilities and public safety operations at the University of South Florida. She assumed this role after serving as the City of Tampa’s administrator for development and economic opportunity. She previously served as the chief administrative officer of USF Health at the University of South Florida. She was formerly the executive vice president at New York Law School, and before that, the Commissioner of the New York City Department of Information Technology and Telecommunications (DoITT) and New York City's chief information officer (CIO). She was the first woman to have held such an office of the City of New York.

== Background ==
Carole Post is a native of Bradenton, Florida. She received a B.S. degree from the University of Florida and a J.D. degree from Seton Hall University School of Law. She is licensed to practice law in New York and Florida.

== Career ==
=== Early career ===
After graduating from the University of Florida, Post joined Plan Services, Inc. in Tampa, Florida—a division of Dun and Bradstreet. She rose to a national representative position and thereafter was appointed as an executive director. Post remained at Plan Services, Inc. for five years.

Post left her corporate position to attend Seton Hall University Law School in Newark, New Jersey. Upon graduating, Post joined a private law firm in Palm Beach Gardens, Florida, becoming the first female member of the firm. She worked in the municipal law department where she represented local municipal governments in Palm Beach County.

In 1999, one of her clients, the City of Palm Beach Gardens, hired her as acting city manager, overseeing all city operations. In this position Post first started to deal with matters involving information technology, particularly the operational and technical issues related to the new millennium. She served in this capacity until mid-2000.

=== New York City Government ===
Department of Buildings

In late 2001, Post joined the City of New York, initially as a deputy director in the enforcement division of the New York City Department of Buildings., and later serving as its executive director of strategic planning.

Mayor Bloomberg's Office of Operations

In 2006, Post was appointed director of agency services in Mayor Michael Bloomberg's office of operations. Early in her tenure, she launched NYCStat, a website providing access to key municipal reports and statistics. Following the 2008 recession, she led the creation of the NYCStat Stimulus Tracker, which catalogued stimulus funding data to allow NYC agencies and residents to analyze citywide expenses, performance, and job creation metrics. She also led the upgrade of NYC's 311 call center and 311 online service, as well as the NYC.gov website.

She also launched the Citywide Performance Reporting (CPR) system, a public dashboard of city agency performance and developed the Street Conditions Observation Unit (SCOUT), an initiative that directs city inspectors to survey every city street once per month. She also modernized the mayor's management report, the official public record of New York City agencies' annual performance.

Department of Information Technology and Telecommunication (DoITT)

Post was appointed chief information officer of New York City and commissioner of the NYC department of information technology and telecommunication (DoITT) in 2009. She unveiled a "technology roadmap", and coordinated the adoption of the mayor's open data law, Following the passage of the law in March 2012, she managed the new data system.

Post oversaw the design and rollout of the Citywide IT Infrastructure Services (CITIServ) program, a plan developed in March 2010 to consolidate IT systems of more than 40 agencies and 50 data centers across the city into one system. The program was projected to save the city up to $100 million in data management costs over five years. On March 3, 2011, the first modern data center planned under the CITIServ program opened in Brooklyn.

She coordinated with the New York City Economic Development Corporation and private sector sponsors to host the NYC "Big Apps" competition, an annual competition that challenges programmers and developers to use municipal data to build technology products to solve specific city problems. She led negotiations for citywide licensing agreements with software vendors to consolidate dozens of contracts; this was projected to save the city up to $68 million over five years.

Post managed DoITT participation in a public-private partnership with Microsoft and SelfHelp Community Services to create the “virtual senior center,” which provides home-bound senior citizens in NYC with better access to community services

In late 2011, she launched a citywide program to reduce the "broadband gap" through arrangements with cable franchisees. This enabled deployment of free wireless internet in 30 public parks, upgrades to internet service in community centers and libraries, and installation of expanded fiber cable into commercial and industrial areas of the city. She coordinated a DoITT partnership with the New York City Department of Youth and Community Development and Time Warner Cable to create a learning lab at Harlem's James Weldon Johnson Community Center. The lab, which opened in April 2012, provides free high-speed internet, upgraded computer technology, and e-learning programs for adults and children.

Post was named a “Top 50 Government CIO” by Information Week: Government magazine in March 2011. She was also named “2011 New York State Public Sector CIO of the Year” at the 2011 New York State CIO Academy on April 6, 2011.

Post resigned from DoITT to serve as executive vice president and chief strategy officer at New York Law School in April 2012.

=== New York Law School ===
Post joined New York Law School as executive vice president and chief strategy officer on April 12, 2012. Soon after joining NYLS, she worked with Dean Anthony Crowell and NYLS faculty on the creation of a new long-term Strategic Plan for the institution. I

=== City of Tampa ===
From February 2020 through February 2022, Post joined City of Tampa Mayor Jane Castor’s senior cabinet as the administrator for development and economic opportunity. In this role Post was responsible for a large, complex municipal operation including the City’s building, permitting and inspection services; its housing and community development division; zoning and land use; historic preservation; and real estate services. She also oversaw the Tampa Convention Center, City Planning, Economic Development, and various COVID-19 response efforts.

=== University of South Florida ===
In October 2016, Post joined the University of South Florida as the deputy chief operating officer for USF Health. The following year, she was named chief administrative officer for USF Health. In February 2020, she took a leave of absence from USF to serve as the City of Tampa’s administrator for development and economic opportunity. In February 2022, Post returned to USF as the vice president of facilities and public safety operations for the university. In this role, she oversees departments including Design and Construction, Land Use and Planning, Parking and Transportation Services, Facilities Services, Maintenance and Utilities, Environmental Health and Safety, Emergency Management, and University Police.
