= Irving Anker =

American educator and administrator

Irving Anker (October 27, 1911 – June 12, 2000) was an American educator and administrator who served from 1973 to 1978 as New York City Schools Chancellor, overseeing the largest school district in the United States at a time when control of schools was being transferred to local community school districts and when the fiscal crisis besetting the City of New York forced major staffing cuts. He had also served as Acting Chancellor in 1970 while the New York City Board of Education was searching for a permanent replacement.

== Early life and education ==
He was born on October 27, 1911, in Red Hook, Brooklyn, his parents were Jewish immigrants who had received little formal education. A product of the New York City public schools, Anker attended City College of New York, where he earned bachelor's and master's degrees. He started teaching in 1934 at Erasmus Hall High School and worked his way up through the school system, becoming chairman of social studies at Long Island City High School, and then principal of Benjamin Franklin High School in East Harlem. Anker was named as an assistant superintendent in 1966 and was replaced as principal of Benjamin Franklin High School by Leonard F. Littwin.

== Deputy and Acting Chancellor ==
While searching for a permanent Superintendent of Schools in 1970 for Nathan Brown, the Board of Education named Anker to serve as Acting Superintendent until the position was filled. The Board had approached, and been turned down by, such notables as Ralph Bunche, Ramsey Clark, Arthur J. Goldberg and Sargent Shriver, before choosing Harvey B. Scribner, who had been Commissioner of the Vermont Department of Education and superintendent of the Teaneck Public Schools, where he oversaw the implementation of a voluntary school integration program.

Described as an "answer man to any question anybody's got about the city's school system", Anker didn't know that his salary as Acting Superintendent of Schools would be $48,000, and increase of almost $14,000 from his previous post as assistant superintendent. Anker's title was renamed to Chancellor as of July 1, 1970, the same day that the 32 local school boards were to take office. Anker expressed concern that "decentralization is going to be a time-consuming and touchy job" and expressed fears that it could lead to all-white and all-black schools.

After being selected as Chancellor and as desired by the board of education, Scribner chose Anker to fill the newly created position of deputy chancellor at an annual salary of $48,000, to give Scribner a senior aide and second-in-command with experience in the New York City system. Scribner's post in Vermont did not expire until September 1, 1970, and Anker remained as Acting Chancellor until that date.

Citing what he called a "confidence gap" with the Board of Education, Scribner announced in December 1972 that he would leave his post as Chancellor when his three-year contract ended on June 30, 1973.

Before going on a vacation (that would prove permanent) starting on April 1, 1973, Chancellor Scribner named Anker to serve as Acting Chancellor until Scribner's contract expired on June 30. While the New York City Board of Education had not decided on a replacement, Anker was seen as the most likely person to fill the spot on a permanent basis if the board's choice was an "insider".

== Chancellor ==
As had been widely expected, Anker was named as School Chancellor in June 1973, with Samuel Polatnick as executive director of the Office of High Schools, Dr. Edythe J. Gaines atop the Office of Educational Planning and Support and Alfredo Mathew, Jr., as chief of the Office of School District Affairs.

As School Chancellor, Anker oversaw the decentralization program that began in 1969 in which staffing choices in elementary and middle schools were made by a network of 32 community school boards. Often viewed as a steppingstone to political office or as an opportunity for patronage, Anker was often at odds with the local boards, ultimately investigating charges of corruption or mismanagement in seven of the 32 local boards and using his powers to suspend board members or to override their actions. In one of his first confrontations, after dismissing the school board of District 9 in the Bronx and replacing it with a trustee he appointed, Anker faced a sit-in by parents who viewed Anker's actions as a racially motivated effort to undermine local control.

In December 1974, Anker submitted a proposed $2.78 billion budget for the 1975-76 school year that would add more than $500 million in spending over the previous budget, which would be used to expand services for handicapped and non-English-speaking students. Anker resisted efforts by Mayor of New York Abe Beame to cut services during the depths of New York City's fiscal crisis, saying that he was only requesting "enough money to make the schools as good as possible - not nearly enough to make them as good as they ought to be".

In a time of belt tightening citywide, Anker said that "we cannot write off the children of New York City without calling into question every value we live by".

City budget officials forced Anker to make $230 million in cuts, including the termination of 21,000 positions in the system, increasing class sizes and reducing much of the art, music and after-school programs that had previously been offered. The increased burdens on the remaining teachers led to a five-day strike in September 1975 by the United Federation of Teachers, which ended when Anker agreed with UFT head Albert Shanker to cut 90 minutes from the school day.

In an effort to more thoroughly integrate the city's high schools, Anker had the attendance zones of high schools in Brooklyn modified to achieve a greater balance between white students and the increasing numbers of African American and Hispanic students, which resulted in further white flight from the city and its schools. The Board of Education was charged in 1977 by the federal government, which claimed that the city's schools discriminated in the hiring of African American and Hispanic teachers and had improperly concentrated minority teachers in majority minority schools. Anker implemented changes to expand hiring of minority teachers and to achieve a more even distribution of staffing around the school system.

After taking office in January 1978 as Mayor of New York, Ed Koch forced out Anker as Chancellor in favor of Frank Macchiarola, a key Koch advisor who had been a vice president of the CUNY Graduate Center and deputy director of the New York State Emergency Financial Control Board for New York City; Anker would serve until his contract ended on June 30, 1978.

== Personal ==
After departing the city schools, Anker became an educational consultant, in addition to teaching at a Florida community college and at the Graduate School of Education of Long Island University.

A resident of Jamaica, Queens, Anker died at his home there at age 88 on June 12, 2000, of natural causes. He was survived by his wife, three daughters, a son and seven grandchildren. A product of the city school system himself, all three of his children attended city public schools.

Academic offices
Preceded by Nathan Brown	Schools Chancellor of New York City; 1970	Succeeded by Harvey B. Scribner
Preceded by Harvey B. Scribner	Schools Chancellor of New York City; 1973-1978	Succeeded by Frank Macchiarola
