= New York City Campaign Finance Board =

Independent New York City campaign finance agency

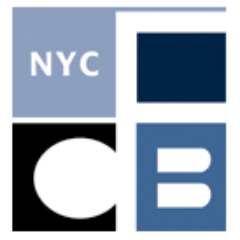

Agency overview
- Formed: 1988
- Jurisdiction: New York City
- Headquarters: 100 Church Street New York, NY
- Employees: 213 (FY2025)
- Annual budget: US$103.4 million (FY2025)
- Agency executives: Paul S. Ryan, Executive Director; Frederick Schaffer, Chair
- Key document: New York City Charter
- Website: www.nyccfb.info

The New York City Campaign Finance Board (CFB) is an independent, nonpartisan New York City agency that administers the city's public campaign financing system and provides campaign finance information to the public. Its responsibilities include enforcing the New York City Campaign Finance Act, auditing campaigns for compliance, administering the public matching funds program for candidates for city office, and conducting voter outreach and education under the NYC Votes brand. The CFB’s stated goals include increasing voter participation, strengthening the role of small contributors, expanding the pool of candidates able to run for office, and reducing the potential for actual or perceived corruption in municipal elections.

The agency's origin dates to the mid-1980s, when mayor Ed Koch proposed ethics reforms in response to several local corruption scandals. These efforts led to the Campaign Finance Act, adopted by the New York City Council on February 29, 1988, and to charter revisions approved by voters later that year establishing the CFB as an independent agency.

== Structure and appointment process ==
The CFB is governed by a five-member board whose members serve staggered five-year terms and may be reappointed. Two members are appointed by the mayor, two by the speaker of the New York City Council, and the chair is appointed by the mayor after consultation with the speaker. Board members have typically included attorneys, academics, and civic and faith leaders.

The founding board members appointed in April 1988 were Rev. Joseph A. O'Hare, S.J., James I. Lewis, Frank J. Macchiarola, Robert B. McKay, and Sonia Sotomayor.

The board as of 2025 consists of:

1. Frederick Schaffer, Chair (appointed by Mayor Bill de Blasio on March 1, 2017, reappointed by Mayor de Blasio for a full five-year term, and reappointed by Mayor Eric Adams on February 28, 2024, through November 30, 2028)
2. Gregory T. Camp (appointed by former City Council Speaker Melissa Mark-Viverito on March 28, 2017, and reappointed by City Council Speaker Adrienne Adams on February 28, 2022, through November 30, 2026)
3. Richard J. Davis (appointed by former City Council Speaker Christine Quinn in June 2009, reappointed by Mark-Viverito on December 1, 2014, and reappointed by Speaker Corey Johnson on December 1, 2019, through November 30, 2029)
4. Lawrence Moskowitz (appointed by Mayor de Blasio on April 23, 2021, through November 30, 2025)
5. Dawn L. Smalls (appointed by Mayor Adams on March 29, 2023, through November 30, 2027)

The agency’s executive director, responsible for day-to-day operations, is attorney Paul S. Ryan, who was appointed in February 2024.

== The Campaign Finance Act ==
The CFB administers New York City’s Campaign Finance Program, created by the Campaign Finance Act and codified in the New York City Administrative Code and Charter. The Act covers candidates for mayor, public advocate, comptroller, borough president, and City Council. Candidates who join the voluntary program agree to abide by contribution and spending limits and to detailed disclosure and auditing requirements in exchange for eligibility to receive public matching funds.

All covered candidates must periodically disclose the sources and uses of their campaign funds; the CFB publishes this information through its "Follow the Money" online database. The Board audits every campaign for these offices, may investigate potential violations on its own initiative or in response to complaints, and has authority to issue subpoenas, take sworn testimony, and require document production.

The CFB’s enforcement and investigatory powers differ from those of the New York City Conflicts of Interest Board, which ordinarily relies on the New York City Department of Investigation for investigative support.

== The Campaign Finance Program ==
The Campaign Finance Program has undergone multiple revisions since its first use in the 1989 elections, often based on recommendations in the CFB’s post-election reports. The program is intended to encourage candidates to seek many small contributions from city residents rather than fewer large donations, and to enable candidates of modest means to compete for local office.

=== Matching funds ===
Under the current system, the CFB provides public matching funds to participating candidates who meet qualifying thresholds and comply with program rules. For the 2025 citywide elections, the program matches each dollar that an individual New York City resident contributes, up to a capped amount, at an 8-to-1 rate. Depending on the office, the first US$175 or US$250 of an individual’s contribution is matchable, for a maximum of between US$1,400 and US$2,000 in public funds per contributor. Maximum public funds payments per election are set as a percentage of the applicable spending limit and vary by office.

The CFB and outside analysts have argued that the matching funds program encourages candidates to broaden their fundraising base. A 2012 study by the Brennan Center for Justice and the Campaign Finance Institute concluded that New York City’s matching funds system gives candidates “an incentive to reach out to a broader and more diverse array of constituents to fund their campaigns,” helping to strengthen connections between elected officials and their constituents.

=== Contribution restrictions ===
Contribution limits and related rules apply to all covered campaigns, whether or not a candidate joins the public financing program. Limits are adjusted every four years based on changes in the Consumer Price Index.

For the 2025 citywide elections, individual contribution limits per election cycle are:

Office	Participant	Non-participant
Mayor, Public Advocate, Comptroller	US$2,100	US$3,700
Borough President	US$1,600	US$2,650
City Council	US$1,050	US$1,600

Lower limits apply to contributors with “business dealings with the city.” For such donors, the limits are US$400 (mayor, public advocate, comptroller), US$320 (borough president), and US$250 (City Council), and their contributions are neither matchable nor counted toward the thresholds to qualify for public funds.

Program participants are prohibited from accepting contributions from corporations, limited liability companies, or partnerships, and may only accept contributions from political committees that have registered with the CFB and agreed not to use corporate funds. Candidates may contribute only limited amounts to their own campaigns; those who wish to self-finance beyond those limits can join the program as “limited participants”, who are subject to spending limits but not eligible for public matching funds.

=== Spending limits ===
Participants must comply with spending limits that vary by office and election period (primary, general, and out-year). For the 2025 elections, the primary and general election spending limits range from US$228,000 for City Council campaigns to US$7.93 million for mayoral campaigns, with separate “out-year” limits for earlier spending.

When a non-participating opponent raises or spends more than half of the applicable spending limit, participating candidates’ spending limits may be increased by 50 percent; if a non-participant raises or spends more than three times the limit, participants in that race are no longer bound by a spending limit.

=== Threshold requirements ===
To qualify for public matching funds, candidates must demonstrate a minimum level of local support by raising a specified amount of money in small contributions from New York City residents and meeting a minimum number of matchable contributions. Thresholds vary by office. For the 2025 citywide elections, the thresholds range from at least US$5,000 from 75 contributors for City Council to at least US$250,000 from 1,000 contributors for mayoral candidates.

Only the first portion of an individual New York City resident’s contribution (up to US$175 or US$250, depending on the office) counts toward the dollar threshold and is eligible to be matched.

== Debate program ==
The CFB administers a mandatory debate program for leading candidates in citywide offices (mayor, public advocate, and comptroller) who participate in the public matching funds program. The debate requirement was adopted in the 1990s after public frustration that mayoral candidates accepted substantial public funds without participating in widely viewed debates, notably during the 1993 mayoral race between David Dinkins and Rudy Giuliani.

Two debates are held before each primary and general election; an additional debate is held if a runoff election is required. To qualify for the first debate, participating candidates must meet fundraising and spending thresholds that indicate a minimum level of public support, and debate sponsors may apply additional non-partisan, objective criteria in consultation with the CFB. The second debate in each series is limited to “leading contenders”, as determined by additional non-partisan criteria.

Debate sponsors may invite non-participating candidates if they meet the same objective criteria, but public matching funds are not conditioned on accepting invitations to debates beyond those required by law.

== NYC Votes ==
Under the brand NYC Votes, the CFB conducts voter outreach and education and supports voter registration efforts citywide. The CFB’s Voter Assistance Unit works with the Voter Assistance Advisory Committee (VAAC) to organize events, distribute voter education materials, and partner with community organizations.

Since 1989, the CFB has published a nonpartisan voter guide for municipal elections, now produced in multiple languages and distributed in print, online, and as a video guide. The guide provides information on how to vote, candidate statements, and explanations of ballot proposals.

== History ==
=== Debate requirement ===
The Debate Program grew out of public frustration during the 1993 mayoral campaign, when Giuliani and Dinkins did not participate in a widely accessible, CFB-sponsored debate despite receiving millions of dollars in public funds. At 1993 post-election hearings, mayor-elect Giuliani testified that candidates receiving public campaign funds should be required to “satisfy some of the public frustration” by debating their opponents.

In 1996, City Council Speaker Peter Vallone introduced legislation to require debates for participating candidates for citywide office. The measure passed the Council on November 14, 1996, and the debate requirement was first in effect for the 1997 elections.

=== Banning corporate contributions ===
In 1998, the City Council increased the matching rate to four-to-one for candidates who voluntarily refused corporate contributions, and that same year a charter revision approved by referendum banned corporate contributions entirely. Subsequent amendments extended the ban to contributions from limited liability companies and most partnerships.

=== September 11, 2001 ===
The 2001 primary election was originally scheduled for September 11, 2001. After the September 11 attacks, the primary was postponed until September 25, 2001. The CFB temporarily relocated its operations from Lower Manhattan to Fordham University’s Lincoln Center campus and continued to assist campaigns while revising deadlines and guidance for the affected election cycle.

=== Doing business restrictions ===
Legislation enacted in 2007 created special rules for contributions from individuals and entities with business dealings with the city and directed the CFB to maintain a public “Doing Business Database” listing such contributors. Contributions from individuals listed in the database are subject to lower limits and are not eligible for public matching funds or for threshold calculations.

=== Extension of term limits ===
In 2008, Mayor Michael Bloomberg announced support for extending term limits for city elected officials from two terms to three, a change that would allow him to seek a third term. After contentious debate, the City Council passed Local Law 51 of 2008, which extended term limits to three terms for sitting elected officials. The change significantly affected the dynamics of the 2009 election cycle, including the administration of the Campaign Finance Program.

=== Voter Assistance Advisory Committee ===
In 2010, New York City voters approved a charter amendment consolidating the city’s voter outreach functions by merging the Voter Assistance Commission into the CFB. VAC staff joined the CFB in January 2011 to form the Voter Assistance Unit, and the Voter Assistance Advisory Committee (VAAC) was created to advise the Board on voter engagement efforts.

=== Independent expenditures ===
Following voter approval of a 2010 charter amendment, the CFB adopted disclosure rules for independent expenditures in city elections. The rules require independent spenders to register with the Board and to report certain communications and spending above specified thresholds, including television, radio, print, and digital advertising advocating the election or defeat of candidates or referring to them shortly before an election. Independent expenditures are not subject to contribution or spending limits but must be clearly identified as independent from candidates’ campaigns.

== Controversies ==
=== Chairman replacement ===
Mayor Dinkins attempted to replace founding chair Joseph A. O’Hare with Thomas J. Schwartz after the 1993 election cycle, a move widely seen as retaliation for the Board’s independent enforcement decisions. A 1994 CFB post-election report and local media described the attempted replacement as a threat to the Board’s independence.

=== Alan Hevesi payment ===
In 2001, Democratic mayoral candidate Alan Hevesi faced scrutiny over unusually low reported payments to his principal campaign consultants, Morris, Carrick & Guma. Questions focused on whether the firm was providing in-kind services that were not being properly reported. The CFB temporarily withheld more than US$2.5 million in public matching funds until the campaign revised its reporting and contract arrangements. The Board later released US$2.6 million in public funds after the campaign submitted additional documentation and modified its agreement with the firm.

=== Bloomberg Independence Party contribution ===
In 2012, the CFB considered whether Mayor Michael R. Bloomberg’s 2009 mayoral campaign violated the Campaign Finance Act by failing to disclose US$1.2 million in payments that Bloomberg made from his personal funds to the Independence Party of New York’s housekeeping account shortly before the general election. The Board ultimately voted to close the complaint, finding that Bloomberg’s personal political expenditures to the party were presumptively campaign-related but did not require disclosure as campaign expenditures under the law in effect at the time.
