= New York Law School =

Private law school in New York City, New York, U.S.

- Motto: We are New York's law school.
- Established: June 11, 1891 (135 years ago)
- School type: Private
- Endowment: $241.5 million
- Dean: Anthony Crowell
- Location: New York City, New York, U.S. 40.7154°N 74.0069°W
- Enrollment: 1,130
- Faculty: 50+ full-time, 100+ part-time
- USNWR ranking: 121st (2025)
- Website: nyls.edu
- ABA profile: Standard 509 Report

New York Law School (NYLS) is a private, American law school in the Tribeca neighborhood in Manhattan, New York City. The third oldest law school in New York City, it was founded in 1891 by Theodore Dwight, who had decades earlier founded Columbia Law School in 1858 when he became its original professor. Nationwide, NYLS is the 50th oldest among 197 American Bar Association-accredited law schools.

NYLS is the only law school founded in New York City between the end of the U.S. Civil War and the 1898 consolidation of all five boroughs (Manhattan, Brooklyn, Queens, The Bronx, and Staten Island) into the City of Greater New York.

The first president of NYLS's Board of Trustees was John Bigelow, who had served as the American Consul in Paris under President Abraham Lincoln and played a crucial role in blocking France and the United Kingdom from intervening on behalf of the Confederacy.

Over the course of 33 years prior to founding NYLS, Dwight had taught thousands of lawyers at Columbia, including the founders of Shearman & Sterling, Sullivan & Cromwell, and Simpson Thacher, as well as Columbia Law School's first African-American student, George Henry Schanck.

NYLS has a full-time day program and, since 1894, a part-time evening program. Its faculty includes more than 50 full-time and over 100 adjunct professors. Notable faculty members have included Woodrow Wilson, Annette Gordon-Reed, Charles Evans Hughes, William Kunstler, Edward A. Purcell Jr., Nadine Strossen, Penelope Andrews, Lenni Benson, founder of the Safe Passage Project, Michael L. Perlin, Carlin Meyer, Chen Lung-chu, and Robert Blecker.

NYLS has produced more NYC Mayors than any other law school, including the son of Civil War General George B. McClellan, George B. McClellan Jr.; John Purroy Mitchel; John Francis Hylan; and Jimmy Walker.

Prominent NYLS alumni include Robert F. Wagner, James S. Watson, Maurice R. Greenberg, former chairman and CEO of American International Group Inc. and current chairman and CEO of C.V. Starr and Co. Inc.; Charles E. Phillips Jr., former CEO of Infor and former President of Oracle; and Judith "Judge Judy" Sheindlin, New York family court judge, author, and television personality. Other past graduates include Wallace Stevens, the Pulitzer Prize-winning poet, Elmer Rice, the Pulitzer Prize-winning playwright, and United States Supreme Court Justice John Marshall Harlan II.

== History ==
=== Early years ===
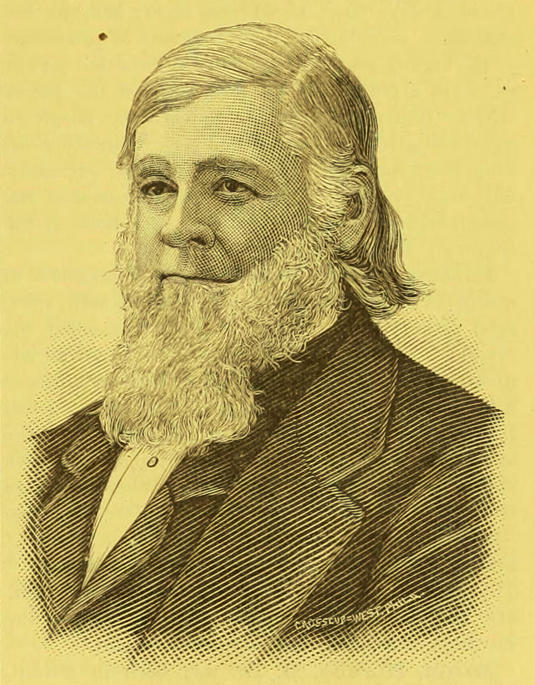
Theodore William Dwight, Founder of New York Law School and Columbia Law School

During the winter of 1890, a dispute arose at Columbia Law School over an attempt by Columbia University president Seth Low to introduce the Case Method of study. The Case Method had been pioneered at Harvard Law School by Christopher Columbus Langdell, who opposed educating women in the practice of law.

Theodore Dwight opposed the case method. Therefore, he and most of Columbia Law School's faculty and students departed Columbia Law School in protest to found NYLS the following year because they believed Columbia, by introducing the case method, had moved away from moral engagement and toward abstraction, hierarchy, and exclusivity.

Ironically, Dwight was succeeded at Columbia by William Albert Keener. A Southerner from Augusta, Georgia, and the son of a carpenter, Keener was born before the outbreak of the Civil War and enjoyed access to education denied African-Americans in the Antebellum South, and he happily implemented Low's agenda so he could remain in New York.

On June 11, 1891, New York Law School was chartered by the State of New York, and the school began operation shortly thereafter. By this time, Theodore Dwight was in poor health and was not able to be actively involved with the law school, so the position of dean went to one of the other professors from Columbia Law School, George Chase. New York Law School held its first classes on October 1, 1891, in the Equitable Building at 120 Broadway, in Lower Manhattan's Financial District.

In 1892, after only a year in operation, it was the second-largest law school in the United States. Steady increases in enrollment caused the law school to acquire new facilities in 1899, at 35 Nassau Street, only blocks away from the law school's previous location; and by 1904, the law school had become the largest law school in the United States. Continuous growth led the law school to acquire a building of its own in 1908, at 172 Fulton Street, in the Financial District. New York Law School would remain at this site until 1918, when it closed briefly for World War I.

=== Persecution by Columbia Law School ===
In 1897, furious about the fact that Dwight resigned from Columbia, taking the entire faculty with him save for one professor, and jealous of New York Law School's success (New York Law School had 617 students, compared to 361 at Columbia), Columbia Law School lobbied the New York State Assembly to oppose New York Law School's effort to obtain a charter to confer law degrees by its own examination -- a privilege all other law schools throughout New York State already enjoyed.

Deans of NYLS
George Chase	1891–1918
School closed for World War I	1918–1919
George Chase	1919–1924
Robert D. Petty	1924–1932
George C. Smith	1932–1936
Alfred E. Hinrichs	1936–1938
Edmund H. H. Caddy	1938–1941
School closed for World War II	1941–1947
Edmund H. H. Caddy	1947–1950
Alison Reppy	1950–1958
Daniel Gutman	1958–1968
Charles W. Froessel	1968–1969
Walter A. Rafalko	1969–1973
E. Donald Shapiro	1973–1983
James F. Simon	1983–1992
Harry Wellington	1992–2000
Richard A. Matasar	2000–2011
Anthony Crowell	2012–present

=== Interwar period ===
When New York Law School reopened in 1919, it was located in another building at 215 West 23rd Street, in Midtown. However, George Chase contracted an illness that resulted in him running New York Law School for the last three years of his life from his bed; he died in 1924. New York Law School continued without Chase, seeing its enrollment peak in the mid-1920s, but it saw a steady decline at the onset of the Great Depression. The law school began seeing a serious decline in enrollment. The law school moved to smaller facilities at 253 Broadway, just opposite City Hall. In 1936, the law school moved to another location at 63 Park Row, on the opposite side of City Hall Park; it also became coeducational that same year. However, the military draft, which started in 1940, contributed to further declines in enrollment, and the school closed in 1941. The remaining students who were still enrolled finished their studies at St. John's University School of Law, in Brooklyn.

=== Reopening ===
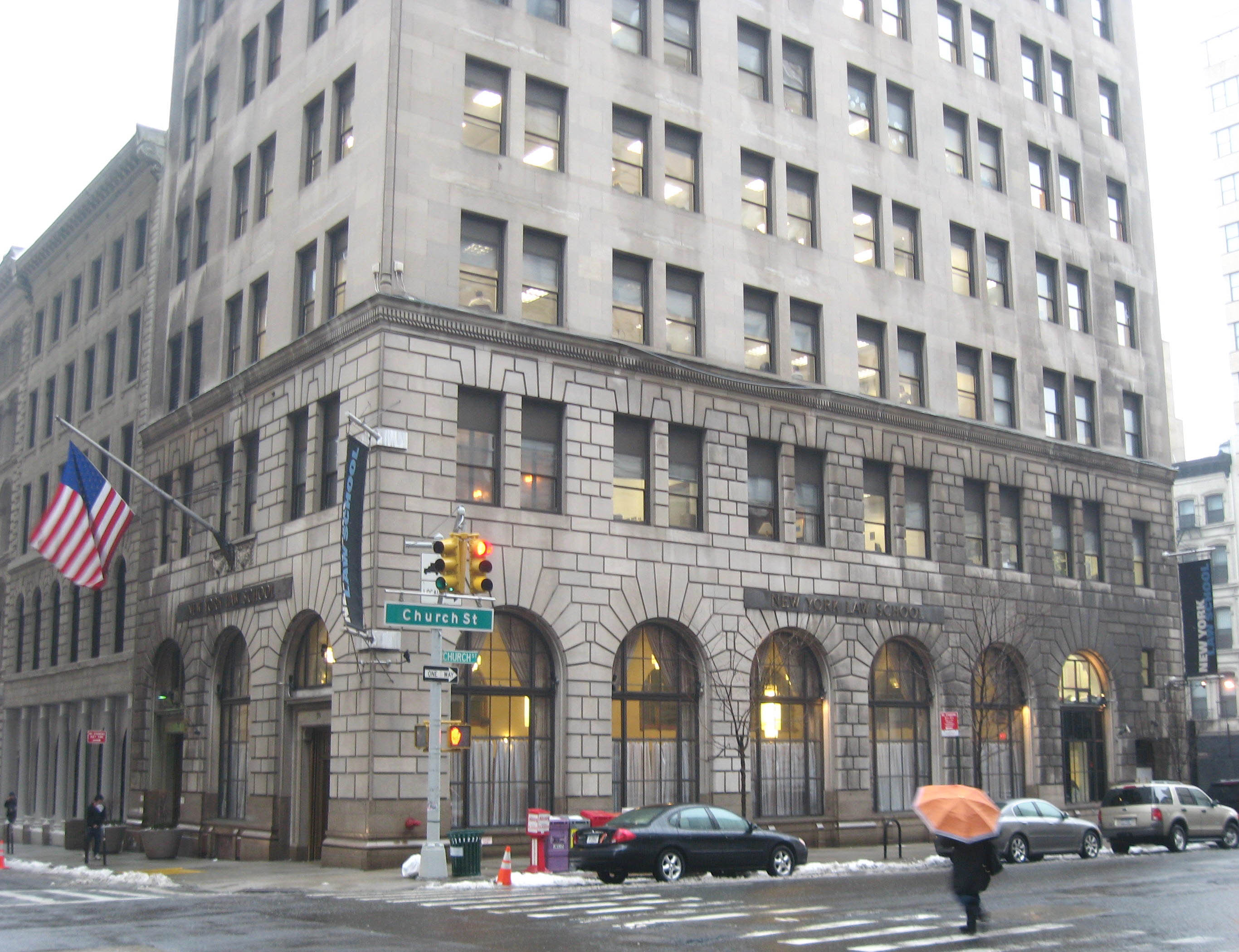
57 Worth Street building

After reopening in 1947, the law school started a new program that was influenced by a committee of alumni headed by New York State Supreme Court Justice Albert Cohn. The law school resumed operations in a building at 244 William Street.

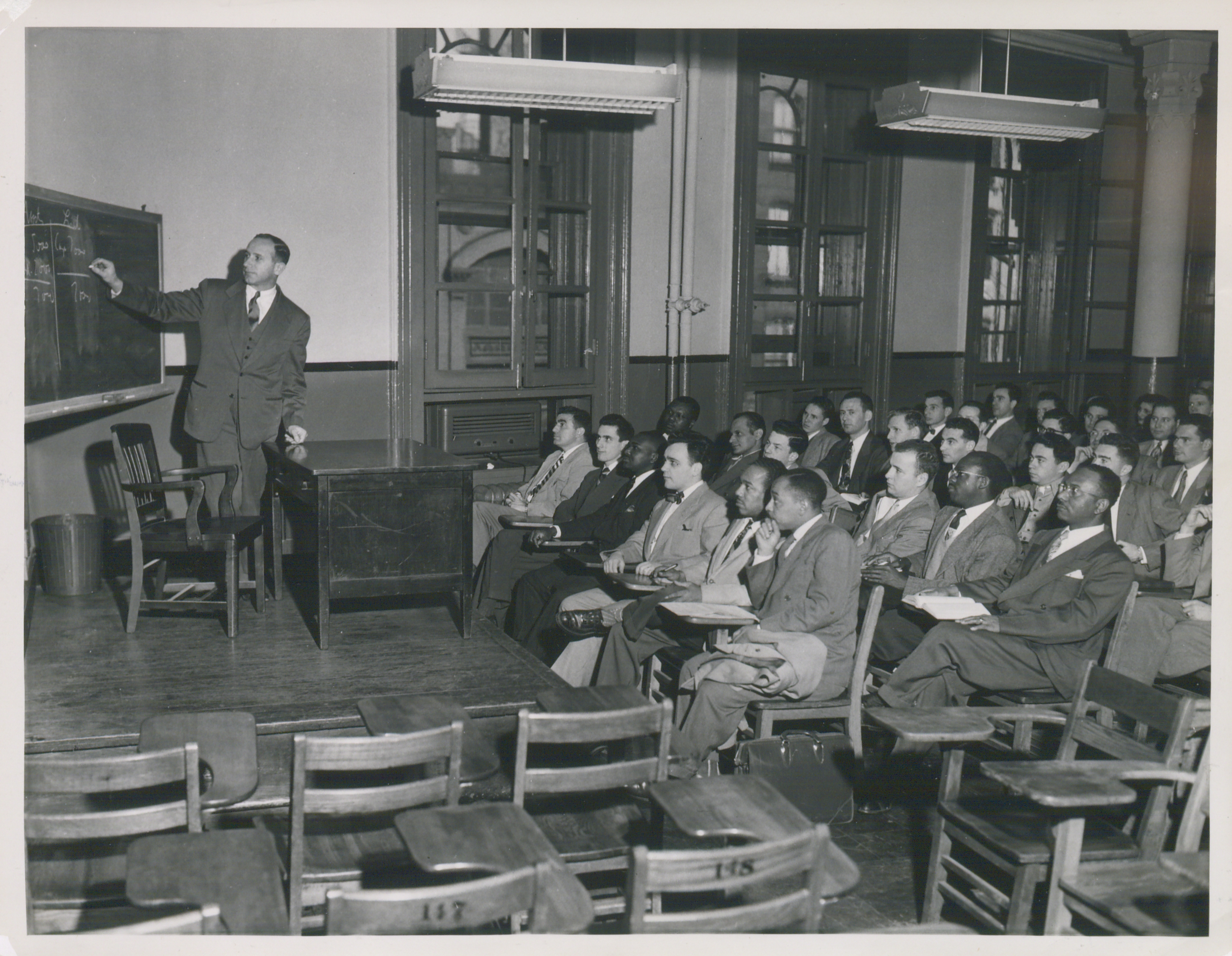
New York Law School Students in Classroom at 244 William Street

In 1954, New York Law School was accredited by the American Bar Association, and in 1962, moved to facilities at 57 Worth Street, in Tribeca.

=== Renaissance ===
In 1973, E. Donald Shapiro became the dean of the law school and reformed the curriculum, expanding it to include many more classes to train students for more than simply passing the Bar Examination. These reforms, combined with the addition of new Joint Degree Programs with City College of New York in 1975 and Manhattanville College in 1978, helped the law school to recruit new students. Dean Shapiro's reform of the curriculum was behind New York Law School gaining membership to the Association of American Law Schools in 1974. That year, the New York State Department of Education changed its view of the law school, which in 1973 it had criticized in a report as the worst school in the state, proclaiming that the law school had started to undergo a "renaissance."

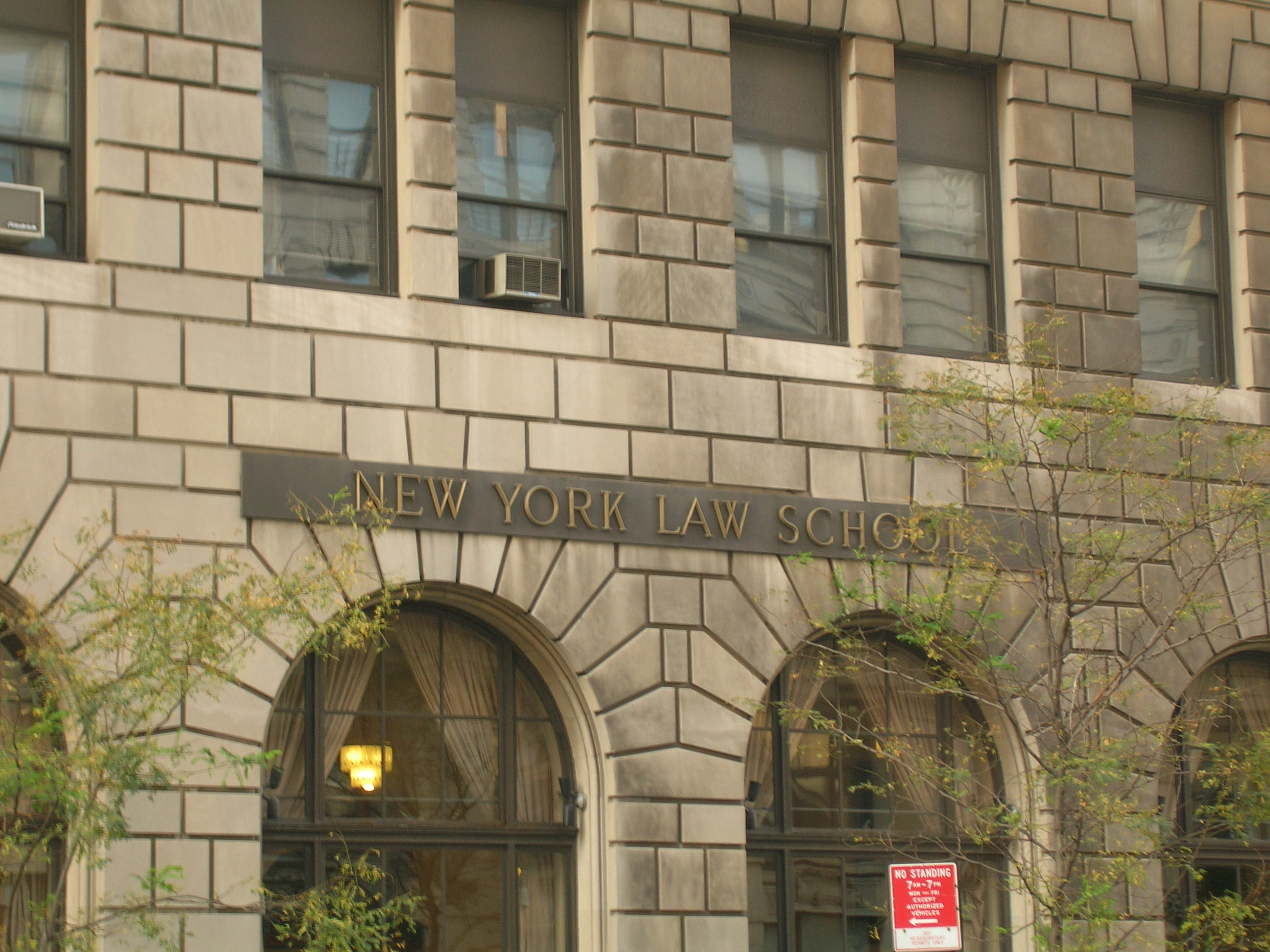

The buildings of the law school underwent renovation under the leadership of Dean James F. Simon from 1983 to 1992. Under Simon's successor, Dean Harry H. Wellington, who served in that position until 2000, the curriculum was revised to put greater emphasis on the practical skills of a professional attorney.

=== 21st century ===
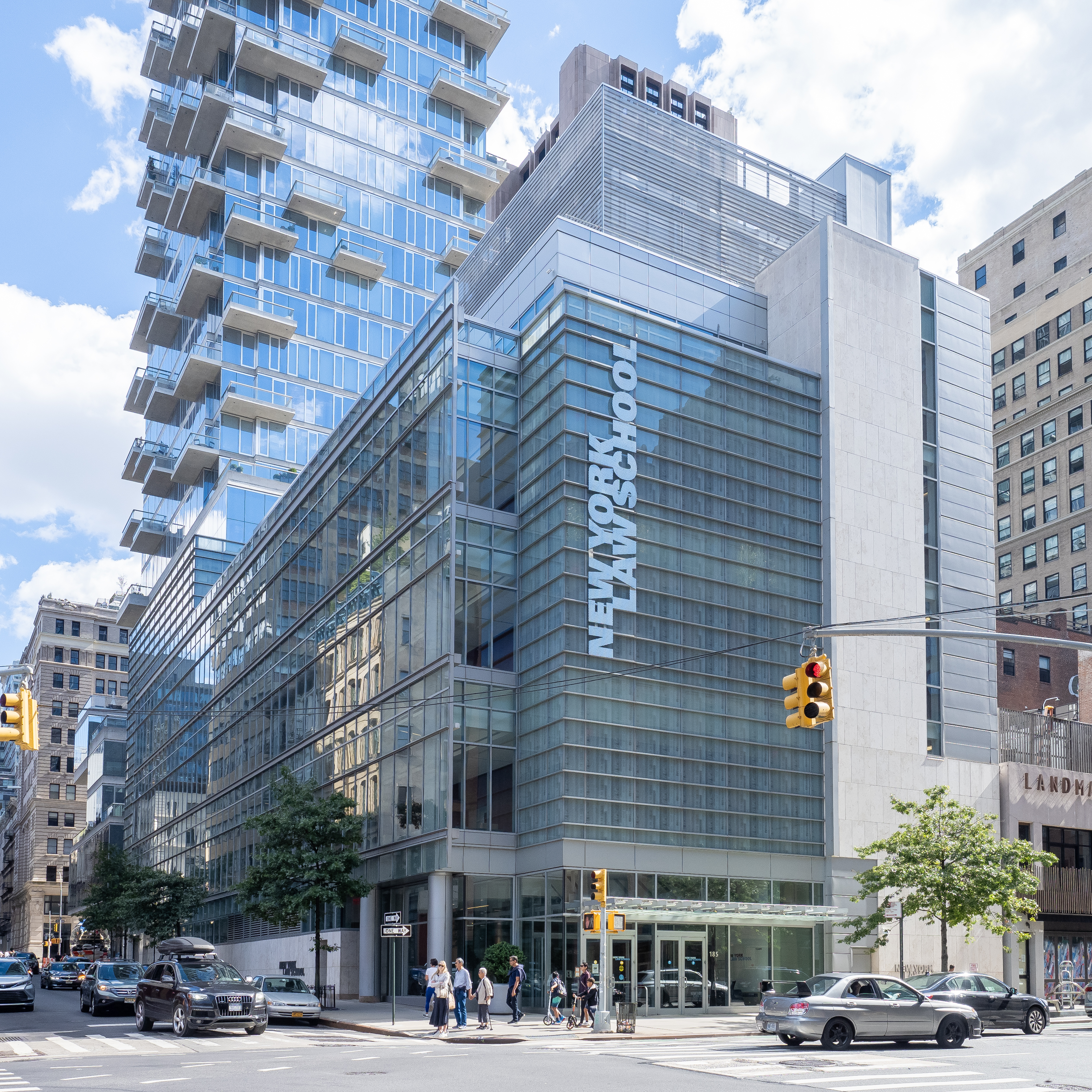
Current Law School in Tribeca

In late June 2006, under the leadership of Dean Richard A. Matasar, New York Law School sold its Bernard H. Mendik building at 240 Church Street. This sale enabled the school to move forward with the sale of $135 million in insured bonds, which were issued through the New York City Industrial Development Agency. The school's securities were given an A3 credit rating by Moody's and an A-minus rating by S&P, both reflective of the school's stable market position and solid financial condition. The proceeds from the building sale have been allocated to the school's endowment, which is now among the top 10 of all American law schools.

The law school opened its first dormitory in the East Village in 2005. In August 2006, it broke ground on the $190 million expansion and renovation program that transformed its Tribeca campus into a cohesive architectural complex that nearly doubled the school's current size. The centerpiece of the expansion is a new glass-enclosed, 235,000-square-foot (21,800 m^{2}), nine-level building—five stories above ground and four below, which integrates the law school's existing buildings. The new facility opened in July 2009, followed by the complete renovation of the law school's existing buildings in the spring of 2010.

On December 16, 2008, in connection with the Bernard Madoff scandal, New York Law School filed a lawsuit against J. Ezra Merkin, Ascot Partners, and Merkin's auditor BDO Seidman, LLP, after losing its $3 million investment in Ascot. The lawsuit charged Merkin with recklessness, gross negligence, and breach of fiduciary duties.

In May 2012, Anthony W. Crowell became the 16th Dean and President of New York Law School. In 2012, Crowell launched JumpStart, an incentive program for NYLS students who undertake bar prep classes. Following the creation of the JumpStart program, NYLS' bar passage rate registered the highest increase of all NY law schools from 2012 to 2013. In February 2013, NYLS launched a public service scholarship program, which extends full and partial tuition scholarships to city, state, and federal service members and public servants living in New York City. In April 2013, New York Law School announced an expansion of its clinical and experiential learning programs, doubling the number offered from 13 to 26.

On September 5, 2013, New York Law School announced the creation of a two-year J.D. Honors program, slated to begin in January 2015. The program allows selected students to graduate one year sooner at two-thirds of the cost of a traditional three-year J.D. program. Each honors student also receives a $50,000 academic scholarship. The inaugural class of 2015 had 23 honors students selected from 166 applicants. In October 2013, in recognition of the two-year program and other innovations, Crain's New York Business included Dean Crowell in its list of "People to Watch in Higher Education."

In April 2015, NYLS announced a partnership with the University of Rochester's Simon Business School, enabling the business school to move its New York City center to the NYLS campus in Tribeca. The agreement enables both institutions to capitalize on different schedules and to collaborate on shared programs to serve their respective students and alumni. The arrangement created the only co-located law school and business school under one roof in New York City.

NYLS opened the Innovation Center for Law and Technology in August 2015. The Innovation Center prepares NYLS students for careers in the science, media, and technology industries. It offers specific instruction in fields including intellectual property, sports law, entrepreneurship, cybersecurity, fashion law, and privacy. The center is directed by professor Houman B. Shadab.

In November 2015, NYLS announced the creation of The Joe Plumeri Center for Social Justice and Economic Opportunity. Supported by a $5 million gift from businessman Joe Plumeri, the Center houses NYLS' more than twenty legal clinics, provides hands-on legal training for students, and offers free legal services to clients through NYLS' law firm.

Government leaders and judges from the United States often speak at or visit the law school. These have included former President Jimmy Carter; Justices of the Supreme Court Ruth Bader Ginsburg, Harry A. Blackmun, William J. Brennan Jr., Antonin Scalia, Clarence Thomas, and Sandra Day O'Connor; former New York State Governor Mario Cuomo; former New York City Mayors Edward Koch, David Dinkins, Rudolph Giuliani and Michael Bloomberg; Drew S. Days III, U.S. Solicitor General; Thomas Pickering, former U.S. Ambassador to the United Nations; and Chief Prosecutor Luis Moreno Ocampo of the International Criminal Court. In May 2011, Newark, New Jersey Mayor Cory Booker gave the commencement address. In October 2011, UN Secretary-General Ban Ki-moon spoke. In March 2012, then-U.S. Senator from Massachusetts, now Secretary of State John Kerry gave the 2012 Sidney Shainwald Public Interest Lecture.

U.S. Supreme Court Justice Stephen Breyer spoke at New York Law School's Commencement in 2018, ending a four-year drought of Supreme Court justices speaking at law school graduations. Earlier in 2018, Justice Ruth Bader Ginsburg spoke at New York Law School, as part of the Sidney Shainwald Public Interest Lecture. In 2020, during the COVID-19 pandemic, New York Law School began offering a simulated Big Law Summer Associate program in partnership with law firm Venable LLP, an eight-week virtual training program to provide students an experience similar to typical work experiences they missed due to the pandemic.

In 2021, alumnus Zygi Wilf, owner of the NFL's Minnesota Vikings, donated $5 million to New York Law School to support public interest law and social justice programs, establish scholarships for 10 students annually, and fund fellowships, and rename the law school's Impact Center for Public Interest Law as the Wilf Impact Center for Public Interest Law. Also in 2021, New York Law School launched the James Tricarico Jr. Institute for the Business of Law and In-House Counsel with support from alumnus James Tricarico to prepare students for in-house legal careers, a "mini-MBA program", and other classes and offerings that merge law, technology, and business skills.

In 2022, New York Law School redesigned its Evening Division program, now called NYLS Pro, to make a Juris Doctor degree more accessible to working professionals and others with significant work and family responsibilities through additional online courses, new programs, and scholarships. Also in 2022, TV personality and alumna Judge Judy Sheindlin, donated $5 million to New York Law School to create the Judge Judy Sheindlin Honors Scholars Program for women law students and support young women and girls interested in legal careers through a partnership with Her Honor Mentoring, a nonprofit organization founded by Judge Sheindlin and her step-daughter, Nicole Sheindlin, a class of 1993 alumna. Sheindlin also addressed graduates at the Barclay's Center in the Law School's first in-person Commencement ceremony since 2019.

== Admissions ==
For the class entering 2021, New York Law School accepted 48.53% of applicants; of those accepted, 24.92% enrolled, with enrolled students having an average LSAT score of 155 and an average undergraduate GPA of 3.49.

== Costs ==
The 2023–24 full tuition for the full-time program is $62,644, and fees are $2,180 for a total of $64,824. For part-time students, the tuition is $48,236, and fees are $1,582 for a total of $49,818.

According to U.S. News & World Report, the average indebtedness of 2015 NYLS students who incurred law school debt was $161,910, and 80% of 2015 graduates took on debt. According to the same source, the average indebtedness of 2013 graduates who incurred law school debt was $164,739 (not including undergraduate debt), and 84% of 2013 graduates took on debt.

== Rankings and reputation ==
General

The 2023 edition of the Law/National Jurist gave New York Law School the following rankings:

- A grade in human rights law
- A+ grade in family law
- Top School for Government and Criminal Law Employment
- A for Intellectual Property Law
- A for alternate Dispute Resolution
- B+ for Practical Training
- B+ in Environmental law
- A in Racial Justice

Specialty

- Ranked #2 nationally among Real Estate Law programs in Law Street's 2016 Law School Rankings.
- Ranked #33 nationally for part-time law students in U.S. News & World Report's 2020 Law School rankings, up from #38 in 2016.
- Received a top "A" rating for Intellectual Property and Technology Law program, an "A−" for Environmental Law, and a citation for the work of the NYLS Office of Diversity and Inclusion in the Winter 2016 issue of PreLaw Magazine.
- Ranked #1 for Practical Training among New York law schools and #13 nationally by National Jurist magazine in 2015.
- Two-year J.D. honors program listed as one of the "10 Most Promising Innovations in Legal Education" by PreLaw Magazine in 2015.
- LL.M. in Taxation ranked #1 for the sixth consecutive year in the 2015 New York Law Journal Reader Rankings. Ranked #2 in New York State and #15 nationally among Taxation programs by National Jurist, based on rankings made by those hiring corporate tax lawyers.

Miscellaneous

- Ranked in the top 15% of all U.S. law schools for diversity by U.S. News & World Report in 2016.
- NYLS professors Ari Ezra Waldman and Stacy-Ann Elvy named to New York Law Journal's 2016 Rising Stars list.
- NYLS student Carlos Valenzuela named one of 25 "Law Students of the Year" in the March 2016 issue of The National Jurist.
- Ranked #16 by The Hispanic Outlook in Higher Education Magazine in its December 2015 ranking of "Top 25 Law Schools for Hispanics.
- Ranked #38 nationally among US law schools by The National Law Journal in 2015 for most alumni promoted to law firm partnerships.
- NYLS' Clinical Year was recognized by The National Jurist as one of the 15 most innovative clinics in the nation in January 2015.
- Recognized by The National Jurist as one of the best schools in the country for practical training in March 2014.
- In December 2013, Hispanic Outlook magazine named NYLS to its list of Top 25 Law Schools with Majority/Minority Hispanic Enrollment and its list of Top 25 Law Schools Granting Most Degrees to Hispanics.
- Recognized in the top third of law schools for scholarly impact in a study released by professors at the University of St. Thomas School of Law in July 2012—using methodology developed by Brian Leiter of the University of Chicago Law School.

== Curriculum ==
New York Law School has three divisions:

- Full-Time Day
- Part Time Evening
- Two-Year J.D. Honors Program

It offers the following degrees:

- J.D.
- LL.M. in Taxation.
- LL.M. in American Business Law.
- Joint J.D./LL.M. in Taxation.
- Joint M.B.A./J.D. with Baruch College.
- Joint Bachelor's Degree/J.D. with Stevens Institute of Technology.
- Joint J.D./M.A. with John Jay College of Criminal Justice.

== Location and facilities ==
NYLS' main campus is located at 185 West Broadway in Tribeca, Manhattan. The new wing of the campus opened in 2009, featuring classrooms, the law library, and collaboration and event spaces. The modern, 235,000 square foot facility was designed by Smith Group and BKSK Architects and is the first large-scale building to be completed in downtown Manhattan after the attacks of September 11, 2001.

The University of Rochester's New York City center for its Simon School of Business is co-located at the NYLS facility, using class and meeting space primarily on weekends as part of a collaborative arrangement between the two academic institutions.

NYLS provides student housing in connection with Educational Housing Services (EHS), a nonprofit organization that specializes in providing New York City student housing. The shared residence hall is located in St. George Towers in the nearby neighborhood of Brooklyn Heights.

== Academic centers ==
The faculty has established seven academic centers that provide specialized study and offer opportunities for exchange between the students, faculty, and expert practitioners. These centers engage many students in advanced research through the John Marshall Harlan Scholars Program, an academic honors program designed for students with the strongest academic credentials. Harlan Scholars affiliate with a center to focus on a particular field of study and complement the broader legal curriculum of the J.D. program.

Center for Business and Financial Law

The Center for Business and Financial Law provides students with skills training in all aspects of corporate, commercial, and financial law. Through courses, events, projects, and research, the Center brings together academics, practitioners, and students to address the challenges that animate business and finance.

C.V. Starr Center for International Law

New York Law School, aided by a grant from the C.V. Starr Foundation, created the C.V. Starr Center for International Law. The center supports teaching and research in all areas of international law. Still, it concentrates on the law of international trade and finance, deriving much of its strength from interaction with New York's business, commercial, financial, and legal communities. The Center organizes symposia events to engage students and faculty in discussions with experts and practitioners in the field. For professional development, the center offers resources for studying and researching careers in international law.

The Center publishes an academic newsletter. The International Review is the only academic newsletter published by an ABA-accredited law school that reports on a broad range of contemporary international and comparative law issues.

Center for New York City Law

The Center for New York City Law was founded to gather and disseminate information about New York City's laws, rules, and procedures; to sponsor publications, symposia, and conferences on topics related to governing the city; and to suggest reforms to make city government more effective and efficient. The center's bimonthly publication, City Law, tracks New York City's rules and regulations, how they are enforced, and court challenges to them. Its Web site, Center for New York City Law, contains a searchable library of more than 40,000 administrative decisions of New York City agencies. The Center publishes three newsletters: CityLaw, CityLand and CityReg.

Center for Real Estate Studies

The Center for Real Estate Studies at New York Law School provides students with an opportunity to study both the private practice and public regulation of real estate. Launched in 2007, the center offers an extensive selection of classroom courses, advanced seminars, and independent study projects, as well as externships in governmental offices and real estate firms. It also sponsors conferences, symposia, and continuing legal education programs on a broad spectrum of issues.

Impact Center for Public Interest Law

The Impact Center for Public Interest Law is the Center housing all of the law school's public interest work. The Impact Center's initiatives address topics such as housing, racial justice, voting rights, public school education, family law, immigration, and criminal justice. The Center develops student and faculty opportunities in public interest law—amicus brief writing, legislative analysis and advocacy, policy research, and community education and litigation—as well as connections within the larger public interest community.

In 2014, the School's Justice Action Center was relaunched as the Impact Center for Public Interest Law. Ever since New York Law School alumnus Senator Robert F. Wagner—the "legislative pilot of the New Deal"—wrote and led the fight to enact the National Labor Relations Act, New York Law School has led on labor and employment law and public policy. In the tradition of Senator Wagner, New York Law School's Impact Center seeks to advance and influence law and public policy with an action-oriented, public-interested agenda.

Innovation Center for Law and Technology

The Innovation Center, opened in August 2015, prepares NYLS students for careers in the applied sciences, media, and technology industries. It offers specific instruction in fields including intellectual property, sports law, entrepreneurship, cybersecurity, fashion law, and privacy. The center is directed by professor Ari Ezra Waldman.

Joe Plumeri Center for Social Justice and Economic Opportunity

The creation of the Joe Plumeri Center was first announced in November 2015. Supported by a $5 million gift from businessman Joe Plumeri, the center will house NYLS' more than twenty legal clinics, provide hands-on legal training for students, and provide free legal services to clients through NYLS' law firm.

== Alumni employment ==
According to ABA-required disclosures, 90.2% of the class of 2022 had obtained employment 10months after graduation, and 83.96% had obtained long-term, full-time JD-required or JD-Advantage employment.

== Notable faculty ==
=== Former ===
- Albert Blaustein, assistant professor (1948–1955), constitutional expert
- Annette Gordon-Reed, presidential scholar, expert in American legal history, and winner of the 2008 National Book Award in nonfiction
- Seth Harris, former deputy secretary of labor, former director of the Labor and Employment Law Program
- William Kunstler, associate professor; director of the American Civil Liberties Union
- Theodore R. Kupferman, assistant professor (1954–1964), later elected to U.S. Congress (1966–1969)
- Carlin Meyer, professor (1998–2015), feminist, and expert on issues of sex, sexuality, family and gender
- Beth Simone Noveck, former deputy chief technology officer in the Obama Administration, founder of Peer to patent public review of pending US patents and named "Top 50 in IP" in 2008 by Managing IP Today
- Woodrow Wilson, taught constitutional law at the law school before becoming president of Princeton University, governor of New Jersey, and the 28th president of the United States

=== Present ===
Full-time

- Penelope Andrews, professor of Law; director of Racial Justice Project
- Lenni Benson, founder of Safe Passage Project, distinguished chair in Immigration and Human Rights Law
- Robert Blecker, pro death penalty activist and star of Robert Blecker Wants Me Dead
- Edward A. Purcell Jr., one of the nation's authorities on the history of the US Supreme Court and the federal judicial system; received the "Outstanding Scholar Award" from the American Bar Foundation in 2013
- Rebecca Roiphe, lawyers' ethics and the history of the legal profession
- Nadine Strossen, president of the American Civil Liberties Union (1991–2008), member of the Council on Foreign Relations

Adjunct

- Richard B. Bernstein, adjunct professor of constitutional law and legal history

== Notable alumni ==
=== Academic ===
- Philip Milledoler Brett (1871–1960), president of Rutgers University
- Francis Patrick Garvan (1875–1937), dean of Fordham University School of Law; later head of the Chemical Foundation, which played a role in the founding of the American Institute of Physics and the National Institutes of Health; remains the only non-scientist to win the Priestley Medal, the highest honor conferred by the American Chemical Society (ACS) for distinguished service in the field of chemistry

=== Business ===
- Chester Carlson, physicist and former engineer at Bell Labs; while a student at New York Law School in 1938 invented the xerography photocopy process
- Arthur G. Cohen, NYC real estate developer, founder of Arlen Realty & Development Corporation, which became the largest publicly traded REIT; served on boards of Citicorp, and John Hancock Mutual Fund
- Maurice R. "Hank" Greenberg, former chairman and CEO of American International Group (AIG); current chairman and CEO of C.V. Starr and Company
- Leo KoGuan, Chinese American billionaire businessman; co-founder of SHI International Corp, third largest shareholder in Tesla, Inc.
- Richard LaMotta, inventor of Chipwich ice cream sandwich, co-founder of Chipwich Inc., later sold to CoolBrands, and then Dreyer's (Nestle)
- Marc Lasry, founder and managing partner of Avenue Capital Group; founder and senior managing director of Amroc, and co-owner of the Milwaukee Bucks of the NBA
- J. Bruce Llewellyn, majority owner of Philadelphia Coca-Cola Bottling Company, co-founder of 100 Black Men of America
- Mario Perillo, aka "Mr. Italy", former chairman and television pitchman for Perillo Tours
- Charles Phillips, CEO of Infor; former President of Oracle Corporation and former managing director of Morgan Stanley
- Joe Plumeri, former chairman and CEO of Willis Group Holdings, and owner of the Trenton Thunder
- Cindy Rose, CEO of Microsoft Western Europe
- Vincent Viola, chairman, owner of Surprise Sports & Entertainment and owner of Florida Panthers
- Zygmunt Wilf, head of Garden Commercial Properties, and principal owner of the Minnesota Vikings of the NFL

=== Civic ===
- Leo Cherne, executive director of the Research Institute of America; chairman of the executive committee of Freedom House; chairman of the International Rescue Committee; served on the U.S. Select Committee for Western Hemisphere Immigrations and the U.S. Advisory Commission on International Education and Cultural Affairs, U.S. President's Foreign Intelligence Advisory Board, and the Intelligence Oversight Board; awarded the Presidential Medal of Freedom by President Ronald Reagan in 1984
- Jeffrey Grant, lawyer and minister, went to prison for loan fraud; based on that experience, co-founded the Progressive Prison Ministries and White Collar Support Group
- Meir Kahane, founder of the Jewish Defense League, assassinated in Manhattan

=== Cultural ===
- Michael H. Hart, author of The 100: A Ranking of the Most Influential Persons in History
- Arthur Hornblow Jr., movie producer nominated four times for Academy Awards Best Picture
- Arnold Kopelson, won Best Picture Academy Award, a Golden Globe, and an Independent Spirit Award, all for his production of Platoon (1986); received a Best Picture Academy Award nomination for his production of The Fugitive (1993); films have collectively received 17 Academy Award nominations
- Ottalie Mark, musicologist, music copyright expert, and first head of research for Broadcast Music, Inc.
- Jerry Masucci, record producer, concert and boxing promoter and filmmaker, founded Fania Records (later owned 10 record companies)
- Arthur B. Reeve, mystery author known for the Professor Craig Kennedy series, published 20 books and 171 short stories, playwright of 20 movies
- Elmer Rice, Pulitzer Prize–winning playwright, The Adding Machine (1923) and Street Scene (1929), Class of 1912
- Judith Sheindlin ("Judge Judy"), New York family court judge, author, and television personality
- Wallace Stevens, Pulitzer Prize–winning poet, Collected Works (1955), Class of 1903

=== Government ===
- Tom Carr, Seattle city attorney and Boulder city attorney
- Bainbridge Colby, United States secretary of state under President Woodrow Wilson (1920–1921)
- Grenville T. Emmet, U.S. ambassador to the Netherlands (1934–1937) and Austria (1937)
- Stirling Fessenden, chairman (1923–1929) and secretary-general (1929–1939) of the Shanghai Municipal Council
- James W. Gerard, U.S. ambassador to Germany during World War I, and New York Supreme Court justice
- Seymour Glanzer, first chief of the Anti-Fraud Section of the U.S. Attorney's Office in Washington, D.C., and one of three original prosecutors in the Watergate Scandal
- Stephen Harding, member of the Connecticut State Senate, minority leader since 2024
- David N. Kelley, US attorney for the Southern District of New York (2003–2005)
- Andrew McCarthy, columnist for National Review, assistant US attorney for the Southern District of New York (1986–2003)
- Charles F. Murphy, former NY state senator
- Dan Oates, chief of police, Miami Beach Police Department
- Melissa Osborne, member of the Connecticut House of Representatives since 2023
- Ferdinand Pecora, chief counsel to the US Senate's Committee on Banking and Currency following the 1932 election of Franklin D. Roosevelt; led Senate hearings, known as the Pecora Commission, into the causes of the Wall Street Crash of 1929, which launched a major reform of the American financial system that resulted in the Securities Act of 1933 and the Securities Exchange Act of 1934; one of the first members of the Securities Exchange Commission
- Adrian Zuckerman, U.S. ambassador to Romania (2019–2021)

=== Judicial ===
- Joan Azrack, United States District Court for the Eastern District of New York, 2014–present
- John S. Buttles, associate justice of the Vermont Supreme Court
- Anthony Cannataro, judge, New York Court of Appeals (2022–present)
- Clarence E. Case, chief justice of the New Jersey Supreme Court
- Albert C. Cohn, New York State Supreme Court justice; father of lawyer Roy Cohn
- Michael N. Delagi, member of the New York State Assembly and municipal court justice
- Charles M. Egan, vice-chancellor of the New Jersey Chancery Court (1934–1948)
- Charles William Froessel, New York Court of Appeals (1949–1962)
- John M. Gallagher, United States District Court for the Eastern District of Pennsylvania (2019–present)
- Louis D. Gibbs, New York state assemblyman, Bronx County Court judge, New York Supreme Court justice
- Thomas Griffith Haight, United States Court of Appeals for the Third Circuit
- Ernest E. L. Hammer (1884–1970), member of the New York State Assembly and justice of the New York Supreme Court
- John Marshall Harlan II, United States Supreme Court justice 1955–1971
- Robert Alexander Inch, chief judge of the United States District Court for the Eastern District of New York
- David Chester Lewis (1884–1975), lawyer, politician, and judge
- Charles C. Lockwood, New York Supreme Court 2nd District (1932–1947)
- Andrew M. Mead, associate justice, Maine Supreme Judicial Court
- Roger J. Miner, chief judge, United States Court of Appeals for the Second Circuit
- Samuel Seabury, New York Court of Appeals, chaired the NYC court/police corruption investigations known as the Seabury Commission
- Judith Sheindlin, Criminal Court Judge, New York
- Henry L. Sherman (1870–1938), justice, New York State Supreme Court, Appellate Division, First Department
- Joel Harvey Slomsky, United States District Court judge for the Eastern District of Pennsylvania
- Saul S. Streit (1897–1983), New York state assemblyman and New York Supreme Court justice
- Myron Sulzberger (1878–1956), lawyer, politician, and judge
- Nicholas Tsoucalas, senior judge, United States Court of International Trade
- George A. Wingate (1871–1955), class of 1893, Surrogate judge of Kings County, New York, National Guard major general
- Julian M. Wright, judge advocate, International Court, Cairo Egypt

=== Political ===
- Robert A. Agresta, council president, Englewood Cliffs, New Jersey (2009–2011)
- Henry C. Allen, U.S. congressman from New Jersey (1905–1907)
- Frank Aranow, member of the New York State Assembly (1915–1917)
- Michael Arcuri, former U.S. congressman, New York's 24th district
- Mario Biaggi, U.S. congressman from New York (1969–1988)
- Julio Brady, lieutenant governor of the United States Virgin Islands (1983–1987), U.S. attorney, attorney general, and territorial court judge in the U.S. Virgin Islands; judge on the Superior Court
- Tiffany Caban, New York City councilmember
- Charles J. Carroll, member of the New York State Assembly
- Robert C. Carroll, New York state assemblymember
- Harry H. Dale, U.S. congressman from New York (1913–1919)
- Isidore Dollinger, U.S. congressman from New York (1949–1959)
- Eliot L. Engel, U.S. congressman, New York's 16th district
- John J. Fitzgerald, U.S. congressman from New York (1899–1917)
- Otto G. Foelker, U.S. congressman from New York (1908–1911)
- Franklin W. Fort (1880–1937), represented New Jersey's 9th congressional district 1925–1931
- Elmer H. Geran, U.S. attorney and U.S. congressman for New Jersey
- Benjamin A. Gilman, U.S. congressman (1973–2003), chair of House Committee on International Relations; former New York assemblyman and assistant attorney general
- Daniel J. Griffin, U.S. congressman from New York (1913–1917)
- Michael Grimm, former U.S. congressman from the 13th Congressional District of New York (Staten Island/Bay Ridge), elected in 2010
- Clarence E. Hancock, U.S. congressman from New York (1927–1947)
- Francis Burton Harrison, U.S. congressman from New York (1903–1913) and governor-general of the Philippines (1913–1921) under Woodrow Wilson
- G. Murray Hulbert, U.S. congressman from New York (1915–1918), resigning to become commissioner of docks and director of the port of New York City; elected president of the Board of Aldermen of New York City (1921), and served as acting mayor during the long illness of Mayor Hylan
- John F. Hylan, New York City mayor (1918–1925)
- Charles D. Lavine, member New York State Assembly (2004–present) representing the 13th District
- Eugene W. Leake, U.S. congressman from New Jersey (1907–1909)
- Warren I. Lee, U.S. congressman from New York (1921–1923)
- Frederick R. Lehlbach, U.S. congressman from New Jersey (1915–1937)
- Samuel Levy, Manhattan borough president (1931–1937)
- Michael McMahon, Richmond County (Staten Island) district sttorney
- John Purroy Mitchel, youngest person ever elected mayor of New York City (1914–1917)
- Guy Molinari, U.S. congressman from New York (1981–1989); father of Susan Molinari, former U.S. congresswoman from New York
- Frederick W. Mulkey, U.S. senator from Oregon, twice elected to finish out the term of other senators who died in office (1907 and 1918; both times, did not seek re-election)
- Irving D. Neustein, member of the New York State Assembly
- Charles F.X. O'Brien (1879–1940), represented New Jersey's 12th congressional district 1921–1925
- James Oddo, New York City council member and Republican minority leader
- Thomas Francis Smith, U.S. congressman from New York (1916–1921)
- Martin M. Solomon, New York state senator (1978–1995)
- Oscar W. Swift, U.S. congressman from New York (1915–1919)
- John Taber, U.S. congressman from New York (1923–1963)
- Guy Talarico (born 1955), member of the New Jersey General Assembly
- William L. Tierney, U.S. congressman from Connecticut (1931–1933)
- Sol Ullman, member of the New York State Assembly
- Robert F. Wagner, chairman of the National Labor Board; United States senator from New York 1927–1949, introduced and won passage of the National Labor Relations Act, or Wagner Act; father of Robert F. Wagner Jr., mayor of New York City
- Alton Waldon, U.S. congressman from New York (1986–1987)
- James J. Walker, New York assemblyman, Senate majority leader, and New York City mayor (1926–1932)
- Royal H. Weller, U.S. congressman from New York (1923–1929)
- David T. Wilentz, attorney general of New Jersey (1934–1944)
- Kalman Yeger, New York City councilmember

=== Sports ===
- Dawn Aponte, American football executive
- Ashley T. Cole, 1939 New York State World's Fair Commission, chairman of New York State Racing Commission 1945–1965
- Walter Dukes, All-American basketball player at Seton Hall University; played for the Knicks, Lakers, Pistons, and Harlem Globetrotters
- Marvin Powell, former Pro Bowl NFL player with the New York Jets
- Corrinne Tarver, 1989 NCAA All-Around Gymnastics champion at Georgia and coach of the Fisk Lady Gymdogs

== See also ==
- Law of New York
- List of investors in Bernard L. Madoff Securities
