= Urban Gonnoud =

Brother Urban Gonnoud

15th President of St. Francis College
- In office 1958–1969
- Preceded by: Brother Jerome Roese, O.S.F.
- Succeeded by: Brother Donald Sullivan, O.S.F.

Personal details
- Born: February 17, 1920
- Died: March 3, 1990 (aged 70)
- Education: St. Francis College (B.A.); St. John's University (M.A.); St. John's University (Ph.D.); New York University (MBA)

Brother Urban Gonnoud, OSF (February 17, 1920 – March 3, 1990) was an American academic. From 1958 to 1969, Gonnoud served as the 15th President of St. Francis College in Brooklyn, New York. Brother Gonnoud earned his bachelor's degree from St. Francis College in 1942 and his master's degree and his Ph.D. in American History from St. John's University. Brother Gonnoud also received a masters of business administration from New York University in 1958.

Prior to becoming President of St. Francis College he taught at several high schools in Brooklyn and Long Island, including St. Anthony's, St. Francis Prep and St. Francis Xavier. Brother Gonnoud had taken his perpetual vows in the Franciscan Order in 1942 and had served in many capacities, including assistant superior general.

== St. Francis College ==
Brother Gonnoud was a member of the Order of St. Francis and a former teacher and president of St. Francis College in Brooklyn. Brother Gonnoud became the 15th President in St. Francis College history in 1958. Under his guidance, the college began a two-phase multimillion-dollar relocation program, moving from the Cobble Hill section of Brooklyn to Brooklyn Heights and the construction of several classroom and residence buildings. Brother Urban Gonnoud resigned in 1969, after 11 years as president. He cited physical and mental exhaustion for his resignation at the age of 49. He continued to teach management courses at the college and was named professor emeritus in 1985. He had served as chief financial officer from 1953 to 1958 and also had previously taught history for the college.
