= Edward A. Purcell Jr. =

American historian (born 1941)

- Born: July 20, 1941 (age 85); Kansas City, Missouri, U.S.

Academic background
- Education: Rockhurst University; Harvard Law School; University of Kansas; University of Wisconsin–Madison

Academic work
- Discipline: History
- Institutions: University of California, Berkeley; Wellesley College; New York Law School

Edward A. Purcell Jr. (born Kansas City, Missouri) is an American historian.

== Life ==
Purcell grew up in Kansas City, Missouri. He attended Rockhurst College, where he received a B.A. in 1962, then went on to the University of Kansas, earning an M.A. in American history in 1964. He received a Ph.D. in 1968 from the University of Wisconsin, then taught at the University of California, Berkeley and at Wellesley College before attending Harvard Law School, where he received a J.D. in 1979. He is the Joseph Solomon Distinguished Professor at New York Law School.

His work has appeared in Virginia Law Review, The University of Pennsylvania Law Review, UCLA Law Review, American Historical Review, the Journal of American History, and the American Quarterly.

== Awards ==
- 2013 Outstanding Scholar Award from the Fellows of the American Bar Foundation
- Charles Warren Fellow in American Legal History at Harvard Law School
- 1972 Frederick Jackson Turner Award
- American Bar Association Silver Gavel Certificate of Merit
- Supreme Court Historical Society’s Triennial Griswold Prize
- Association of American Law Schools’ Coif Triennial Book Award

== Works ==
- Originalism, Federalism, and the American Constitutional Enterprise: A Historical Inquiry. Yale University Press. 2007. ISBN 978-0-300-12203-9.
- Brandeis and the Progressive Constitution: Erie, the Judicial Power, and the Politics of the Federal Courts in Twentieth-Century America. Yale University Press. 2000. ISBN 978-0-300-07804-6.
- Litigation & Inequality: Federal Diversity Jurisdiction in Industrial America, 1870–1958. Oxford University Press. 1992. ISBN 978-0-19-507329-4.
- The Crisis of Democratic Theory: Scientific Naturalism & the Problem of Value. University Press of Kentucky. 1973. ISBN 978-0-8131-0141-5. "Edward A Purcell."
- "The Courts, Federalism, and the Federal Constitution 1920-2000". Cambridge History of Law in America. Cambridge University Press. 2008. ISBN 978-0-521-80307-6.
- Progressive Lawyering, Globalization and Markets: Rethinking Ideology and Strategy (William S. Hein & Co., 2007)
- Private Law and Social Inequality in the Industrial Age: Comparing Legal Cultures in Britain, France, Germany, and the United States (Oxford University Press, 2000)
