= Lenni Benson =

American legal scholar (born 1958)

Lenni B. Benson (born 1958) is an American legal scholar focusing on immigration law and its reform.

Benson grew up in Arizona. After completing her undergraduate degree at Arizona State University in 1980, Benson enrolled at ASU Law, obtaining her Juris Doctor degree in 1983. She then worked for Bryan, Cave LLP. Benson began her teaching career in 1994, and holds a Distinguished Chaired Professorship in Immigration and Human Rights Law at New York Law School, where she founded the Safe Passage Project.

== Selected publications ==
- Crock, Mary; Benson, Lenni, eds. (2018). Protecting Migrant Children: In Search of Best Practice. Edward Elgar Publishing. ISBN 9781786430250.

In 2008 she coauthored a text for Carolina Academic Press that uses integrated hypotheticals to teach U.S. Immigration and Nationality Law. Today the book is in its third edition. Immigration and Nationality Law: Problems and Strategies (Third Ed. 2025)

Selected past articles are available at the NYLS Faculty page Faculty Profile with link to publications
