= Brendan J. Dugan =

18th President of St. Francis College
- In office 2008–2016
- Preceded by: Frank J. Macchiarola
- Succeeded by: Miguel Martinez-Saenz

Personal details
- Born: August 24, 1947 Brooklyn, New York, U.S.
- Died: December 18, 2016 (aged 69) Brooklyn, New York, U.S.
- Spouse: Barbara Dugan
- Education: St. Francis College (B.S.)
- Profession: Banker

Brendan J. Dugan (August 24, 1947 – December 18, 2016) was the 18th President of St. Francis College. Prior to becoming the President of St. Francis College, Dugan served as chairman of St. Francis College's Board of Trustees and as chairman and CEO of Metro New York Division of Santander Bank.

== Education ==
Dugan held a B.S. degree from St. Francis College, obtained in 1968.

== Career ==
Dugan's last banking position was as chairman and CEO of Sovereign Bank's Metro New York Division. Sovereign had acquired Independence Bank where he worked since 2003. Prior to joining Independence, he served as chief operating officer of Citibank Commercial Markets (2001–2003), president of European American Bank (1991–2001) and president and chief executive officer of NatWest USA (1974–1991). Dugan was also a director of Cox and Company, a manufacturer of aerospace parts for military and civil applications.

Dugan died on December 18, 2016, at the age of 69, while serving as the president of St. Francis College.

== Personal ==
Dugan was of Irish heritage. He had been honored by both the St. Patrick's Society of Brooklyn and The Great Irish Fair. Other community organizations bestowing honors upon Dugan in the past include; the Greater Jamaica Development Corporation, the Anti-Defamation League of B'nai B'rith, Helen Keller Services for the Blind, the Crohn's and Colitis Foundation, the American Jewish Congress, Touro Law School, St. Francis College, the Brooklyn Chamber of Commerce, the Brooklyn Children's Museum, and the Boy Scouts of America. In addition in June 2009, Dugan was inducted into the Order of the Knights of St. Gregory the Great by Pope Benedict XVI.
