= New York City Campaign Finance Act =

New York City campaign finance law

New York City Council
- Long title: Local Law No. 8 of 1988
- Citation: New York City Administrative Code § 3-701 et seq.
- Territorial extent: New York City
- Enacted by: New York City Council
- Enacted: February 29, 1988
- Commenced: 1988
- Status: Amended

The New York City Campaign Finance Act is a local law that establishes a system of public financing, disclosure, and enforcement for municipal election campaigns in New York City. It was adopted by the New York City Council on February 29, 1988, as part of a broader package of ethics reforms following several local corruption scandals. It created a voluntary small-donor matching program and an independent Campaign Finance Board (CFB) to administer and enforce the law. The Act is codified in Title 3, Chapter 7 of the New York City Administrative Code and is commonly cited as the "New York City campaign finance act".

Scholars and reform advocates have described the system created by the Act as a pioneering model of public campaign financing that encourages candidates to rely on small contributions from local residents rather than on large donors, and as an influential example for other jurisdictions in the United States.

== Background ==
In the early and mid-1980s, New York City politics were shaken by a series of corruption scandals involving local officials and party leaders. In response, Mayor Ed Koch proposed new ethics and campaign-finance rules, and a 1986–1988 Charter Revision Commission recommended the creation of an independent campaign-finance agency and a public-matching system intended to reduce the real or perceived influence of large contributors and increase transparency.

The Campaign Finance Act, enacted as Local Law No. 8 of 1988 and later incorporated into the Administrative Code, implemented many of these recommendations. A charter amendment approved by voters in 1988 formally established the New York City Campaign Finance Board as an independent, non-mayoral agency responsible for enforcing the Act and administering the public-matching program.

== Legislative history ==
Since its adoption, the Campaign Finance Act has been amended repeatedly to expand the public-financing program, adjust contribution and spending limits, and respond to changes in campaign practices and court decisions.

In 1998, the City Council increased the public-matching formula from a dollar-for-dollar match to a four-to-one match on small contributions. It linked the higher match to a prohibition on corporate contributions. A 1998 charter revision separately banned corporate contributions to city candidates, and a 2007 amendment extended the ban to limited liability companies and most partnerships.

Local Law No. 34 of 2007 added "doing business" contribution limits for individuals and entities with significant business dealings with the city and required the creation of a centralized Doing Business Database to track such contributors. Subsequent amendments in the late 2000s and 2010s increased the matching rate to six-to-one on the first US$175 of an eligible contribution and, following a 2018 charter referendum, to eight-to-one on the first US$175 or US$250, depending on the office sought.

Provisions of the Act have been challenged in state and federal courts, including lawsuits contesting contribution limits, disclosure rules, and "doing business" restrictions. Courts have generally upheld the law as a permissible effort to prevent corruption and promote transparency, while requiring adjustments to specific provisions over time.

== Provisions ==
=== Scope and covered offices ===
The Campaign Finance Act applies to candidates for mayor, public advocate, comptroller, borough president, and members of the New York City Council. Candidates for these offices must file periodic disclosure statements reporting contributions and expenditures, and are subject to contribution limits, source restrictions, and other requirements set out in the Act and in rules issued by the Campaign Finance Board.

Participation in the public-financing program is voluntary. Candidates who decline public funds remain subject to disclosure and contribution limits, but are not bound by all of the spending limits that apply to candidates who join the Matching Funds Program.

=== Public matching funds ===
The Act establishes a system in which qualifying contributions from New York City residents to participating candidates are matched with public funds. The matching rate and the amount of each contribution that may be matched have increased over time. The Program originally provided a one-to-one match on small donations, then a four-to-one match starting in 1998, a six-to-one match on the first US$175 in 2007, and, after 2019 changes, an eight-to-one match on the first US$175 or US$250, depending on the office.

To qualify for public funds, candidates must meet threshold requirements demonstrating a base of support, including raising specified minimum amounts and numbers of small contributions from New York City residents. The Act caps the maximum amount of public funds a candidate may receive in each election and links those caps to office-specific spending limits.

The Act also created the New York City Election Campaign Finance Fund, financed through city appropriations, as the source of matching funds.

=== Contribution limits and sources ===
Candidates covered by the Act are subject to dollar limits on the size of contributions they may accept from individuals and political committees. The law prohibits contributions from corporations and, as a result of later amendments, from limited liability companies and most partnership entities.

Local Law No. 34 of 2007 imposed stricter limits on contributions from individuals and entities that are "doing business" with the city, including principal officers, owners, and certain senior managers of companies holding large city contracts, franchises, concessions, grants, or economic-development agreements. Contributions from such donors are not eligible for public matching funds and do not count toward a candidate's qualifying threshold.

The Act permits candidates to contribute to their own campaigns. Still, it imposes special rules on self-funded candidates who choose to participate in the Program, including different thresholds for debate eligibility and public funding in some circumstances.

=== Disclosure, audits, and enforcement ===
Under the Act, candidates and political committees must disclose detailed information about contributions and expenditures in periodic reports filed with the Campaign Finance Board. These disclosures are made public through the Board's online databases and official Voter Guide materials.

The CFB is authorized to audit every campaign for covered offices and to investigate possible violations of the City Charter, the Campaign Finance Act, or related rules. Its powers include issuing subpoenas, taking sworn testimony, and imposing civil penalties, including fines and the repayment of public funds, for violations such as accepting over-the-limit contributions or making impermissible expenditures.

The Act also requires disclosure and reporting by independent spenders—individuals or entities that make expenditures in city elections without coordinating with candidates—and imposes separate registration and reporting rules on such actors.

=== Debate program ===
Amendments to the Campaign Finance Act in the mid-1990s and early 2000s created a mandatory debate program for candidates for citywide office who participate in the public-financing Program and meet specified fundraising and spending thresholds. The law requires two official debates before each primary and general election, with an additional discussion if there is a runoff election. The CFB selects debate sponsors from among media, educational, and civic organizations that meet non-partisan criteria, and the debates are broadcast citywide.

== Impact and evaluation ==
Academic and advocacy studies have found that the Campaign Finance Act's matching-funds system encourages candidates to seek support from a broader and more diverse pool of small donors than in jurisdictions that rely solely on private fundraising. A 2012 report by the Brennan Center for Justice and the Campaign Finance Institute, Donor Diversity Through Public Matching Funds, concluded that New York City's system gives candidates an incentive to reach out to their own constituents rather than focusing primarily on wealthy donors, leading to more geographically and demographically diverse participation.

Reports by the Campaign Finance Board and outside researchers have credited the Act with limiting the size and influence of large contributions, increasing competition for municipal offices, and improving public disclosure of money in city elections, while also noting the administrative complexity and costs associated with the program.

The New York City model has been cited in debates over state-level and federal campaign-finance reform, and elements of the Act have influenced public-financing proposals and laws in other jurisdictions, including New York State.

== See also ==
- New York City Campaign Finance Board
- Campaign finance in the United States
