= Robert Blecker =

American lawyer

Robert Blecker is an American academic, lawyer, prosecutor and professor of law at New York Law School. He is well known as a defender of the death penalty. Blecker is a supporter of the moral theory of retributivism, and is a public advocate for retributive justice as a justification for punishment.

Blecker was prominently featured in the documentary Robert Blecker Wants Me Dead, which documents his personal relationship with death-row inmate and convicted mass murderer Daryl Holton.

== Career ==
After graduating with a BA degree from Tufts University in 1969, Blecker gained his JD degree from Harvard Law School in 1974. Blecker then worked as an assistant in the office the Attorney General of New York from 1974 to 1975, and was a graduate fellow at Harvard University from 1976 to 1977.

He is professor emeritus at New York Law School, specializing in criminal and constitutional law.

Blecker's writing on the subject of criminal justice, especially capital punishment, has been featured in The Washington Post, CNN and The New York Times. He was described by Newsweek as 'the nation's most prominent retributivist advocate for the death penalty', and prominently featured in the documentary Robert Blecker Wants Me Dead.

== Academic work ==
Blecker describes himself as a retributivist supporter of the death penalty. He advocates for the introduction of a class of especially severe life without parole sentence as a possible substitute for capital punishment in states which have abolished the death penalty, as a means of achieving retribution and providing an incentive to defendants to plead guilty.

== Publications ==
Books

“The Death of Punishment: Searching for Justice among the Worst of the Worst,” Palgrave MacMillan (2013)

Book chapters

“Resolving the Death Penalty: Wisdom from the Ancients,” Chapter 6 in America's Experiment with Capital Punishment: Reflections on the Past, Present, and Future of the Ultimate Penal Sanction, Second Edition, pgs. 169–231 (Carolina Academic Press, 2003)

“Policing the Police,” Chapter 13 in Police and Policing: Contemporary Issues, pgs. 169–180 (Praeger, 1989)
