= Carlin Meyer =

American law professor (born 1948)

- Born: September 7, 1948 (age 77); Chicago, Illinois, U.S.
- Education: Radcliffe College-Harvard University (AB); Rutgers University (JD); Yale University (LLM)
- Employer: New York Law School (1988-2015)

Carlin Meyer (born September 7, 1948) is an American law professor, feminist, and expert on issues of sex, sexuality, family and gender. Meyer is professor emerita at New York Law School.

== Early life ==
Carlin Meyer was born on September 7, 1948, in Chicago, Illinois. Meyer's father, Leonard B. Meyer (1918–2007), was a noted musicologist and composer, and her mother, Lee Malakoff (1921–2017), was a home furnishings buyer and homemaker. Meyer grew up in the Hyde Park neighborhood on the South Side of Chicago, attending the University of Chicago Laboratory Schools, where she was the features editor of the school newspaper, The Midway. She has two sisters: Muffie and Erica.

== Education and activism ==
Meyer went on to attend Radcliffe College (Harvard University) in Cambridge, Massachusetts. At Radcliffe, she became a passionate feminist and anti-Vietnam War activist. She joined a feminist group called Bread and Roses. Meyer states that, “our early talk was about how women always ended up with purple hands from running the mimeo machines rather than serving as leading speakers or scholars…from there it was a short hop to the role of law in promoting male dominance.”

Meyer was a member of the Harvard section of the left-wing organization Students for a Democratic Society (SDS). She was a founding member of SDS's November Action Coalition (NAC) and also participated in, and helped to organize, the occupation of Harvard's University Hall in April 1969. She protested, among other things, Harvard's support of U.S. involvement in the Vietnam War, the presence of Reserve Officers' Training Corps (ROTC) on campus, and Harvard's institutional racism. In a letter dated April 7, 1969, to The Harvard Crimson, Meyer, alongside other SDS members, opposed the support of ROTC by Harvard's then-president, Nathan Pusey:

To conclude: President Pusey and the Corporation want ROTC to stay because they support the U.S. military and the policies it carries out; we feel that ROTC must go because we oppose the policies of the United States and we oppose the military that perpetrates them. The lines are clearly drawn; the time to take sides is now.

For her role in the protest Meyer was arrested and convicted but later acquitted. She graduated cum laude from Radcliffe in 1969. Following graduation, she participated in the building of Arcosanti, an experimental town in central Arizona spearheaded by the well-known Italian architect, Paolo Soleri, who sought to minimize the effect of urbanization on the natural environment.

In the summer of 1971, before starting Rutgers Law School, Meyer joined the National Lawyers Guild, after being “recruited by a funky group of lawyers who were talking law and politics at a diner where [she] stopped en route from Chicago to New Jersey.” While in law school, she remained active in public protest and organizing, enrolling in the urban poverty, gender and law, and constitutional law clinics. As part of her clinic work, she wrote an appellate brief to help halt U.S. intervention in the Cambodian Civil War. In addition, she worked for a local chapter of the Black Lung Association in Beckley, West Virginia. Meyer graduated with a J.D. from Rutgers in 1974.

== Career ==
Following law school, Meyer worked in-house at the national office of the National Lawyers Guild in New York City. In 1975, with a small group of fellow lawyers, Meyer co-founded the law collective, Gladstein, Meyer & Reif (now incorporated as Gladstein, Reif, & Meginniss, LLP). Meyer left after two years and led the first U.S. delegation of lawyers (under the auspices of the National Lawyers Guild) to China, in the normalization of China–United States relations.

From 1977 to 1981, Meyer worked as assistant general counsel to District Council 37 of the American Federation of State, County and Municipal Employees (AFSCME), the largest trade union for public employees in the United States. In 1980–1, while working for the AFSCME, she was a Charles H. Revson Fellow at Columbia University. Then, in 1982, she worked in the Civil Rights Bureau in the New York State Attorney General's Office, before being appointed Labor Bureau chief in 1983. Meyer worked for the attorney general until 1987. She also served as the President of the New York City chapter of the National Lawyers Guild.

Meyer went on to study at Yale University, after having been inspired by a night course in American legal history taught by the legal historian and law professor, Morton Horwitz. She received her LLM from Yale in 1988, at which point Meyer joined the New York Law School faculty as a professor.

At NYLS, Meyer went on to teach courses on labor and employment law, feminist jurisprudence, family law, legal ethics, evidence, and lawyering. In addition, she served as the executive director of the Diane Abbey Law Institute for Children and Families at NYLS. She served on the New York State Legislative Ethics Commission as well as on Mayor David Dinkins’ Commission on the Status of Women. After 27 years of teaching, Meyer became professor emerita in January 2015. Meyer currently serves on the board of directors of the New York Civil Liberties Union (NYCLU) and as part-time counsel for the New York State Assembly Committee on Ethics and Guidance.

Meyer is a member of the Society of American Law Teachers, the New York City Chapter of the National Lawyers Guild, and the Law and Society Association.

== Publications ==
- Meyer, Carlin (1992). "Imbalance of Powers: Can Congressional Lawsuits Serve as Counterweight". University of Pittsburgh Law Review. 54 (1): 63–128.
- ——— (July 29, 1992). "Women's Breasts: So What?". The New York Times.
- ——— (1993). "Decriminalizing Prostitution: Liberation or Dehumanization?". Cardozo Women's Law Journal: 105–120.
- ——— (1994). "Sex, Sin, and Women's Liberation: Against Porn-Suppression". Texas Law Review. 72 (5): 1097–1201.
- ——— (1995). "Reclaiming Sex from the Pornographers: Cybersexual Possibilities". Georgetown Law Journal. 83 (5): 1969–2008.
- ——— (July 24, 1998). "Corporate Democracy – Not Such A Radical Idea". The San Francisco Chronicle.
- ——— (1999). "Women and the Internet". Texas Journal of Women and the Law. 8 (2): 305–324.
- ——— (2002). "International Labor Standards in the WTO's New World Order: Towards Development-Based Standard Setting". Guild Practitioner. 59 (1): 21–30.
- ——— (2003). "Who Cares: Reflections on Law, Loss, and Family Values in the Wake of 9/11". New York Law School Law Review. 46 (3, 4): 653–664.
- ——— (2003). "Not Whistlin' Dixie: Now, More Than Ever, We Need Feminist Law Journals". Columbia Journal of Gender and Law. 12 (3): 539–545.
- ——— (2008). "Brain, Gender, Law: A Cautionary Tale". New York Law School Law Review. 53 (4): 995–1010.
