= Theodora Lacey =

American civil rights activist and educator

Theodora Smiley Lacey
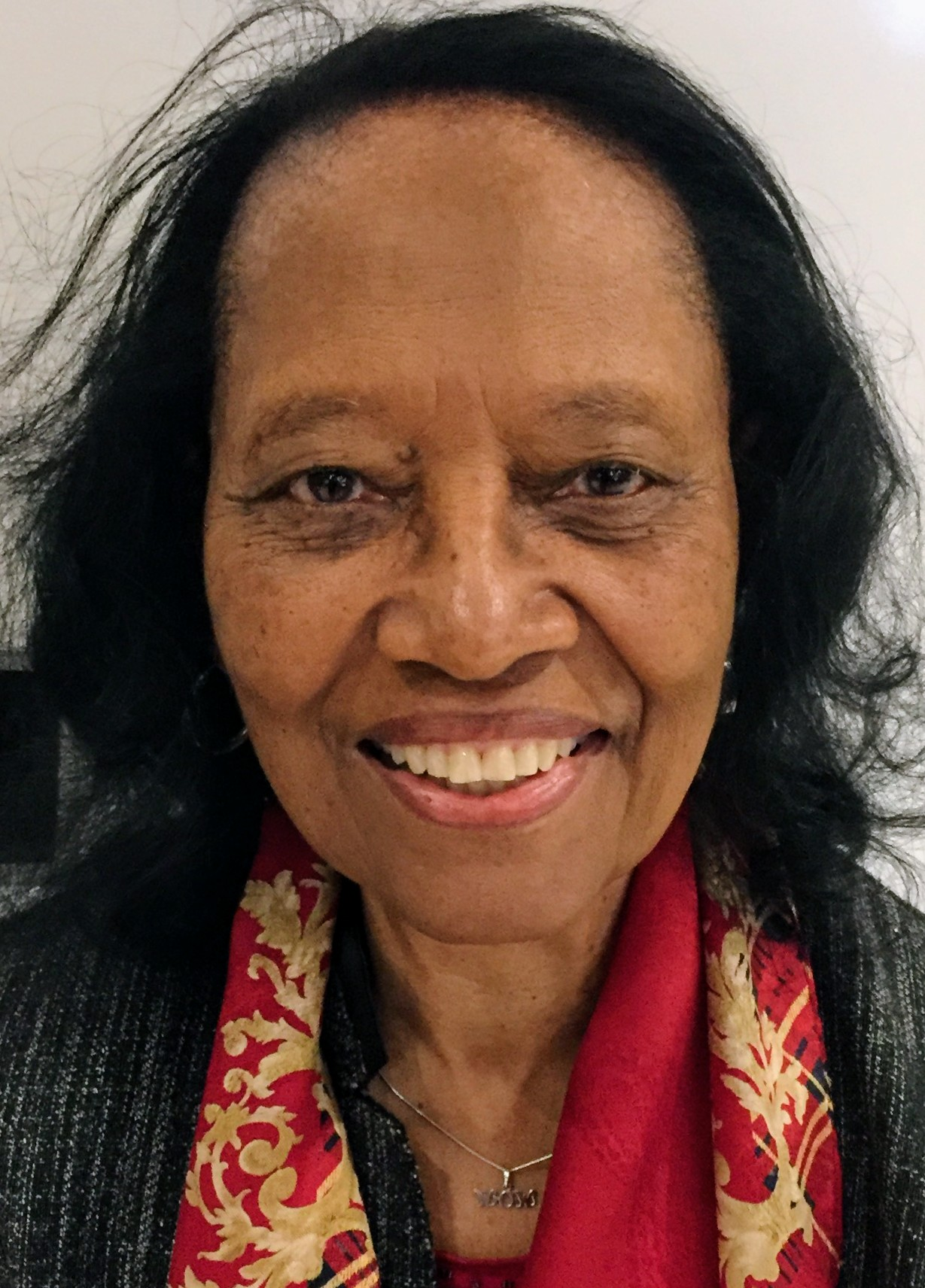
- Theodora Smiley Lacey, speaking at an event at Two Sigma Investments in 2017
- Born: Theodora Smiley; 1932 (age 93–94); Montgomery, Alabama, US
- Education: Alabama State College; Hunter College
- Occupations: Civil rights activist and educator
- Known for: Montgomery bus boycott Teaneck desegregation
- Spouse: Archie Lacey (m. 1956; died 1986)

Theodora Smiley Lacey (born 1932) is an American civil rights activist and educator. She helped organize the Montgomery bus boycott, fought for voting rights and fair housing, and helped lead the effort to integrate schools in New Jersey.

== Early life ==
Lacey was born Theodora Smiley in 1932 in Montgomery, Alabama, and her parents were both educators. At that time, Alabama was highly segregated, Jim Crow laws were in force, and Montgomery became a center of the Civil Rights Movement. Lacey's family was deeply involved in the movement: her mother was a childhood friend of Rosa Parks, and her father, a high-school principal, was president of the board of directors of the Dexter Avenue Baptist Church in 1954 when the church chose their new pastor, Martin Luther King Jr.

Lacey graduated from Alabama State College and worked as a science teacher in Alabama, Louisiana, and later New Jersey.

== Montgomery bus boycott ==
Lacey's first direct involvement as a civil rights activist began in 1955 when her mother's friend, Rosa Parks, was arrested for sitting in the "white" section of a public bus. Montgomery's public transportation system had always been segregated, and other men, women, and children had been arrested for similar offenses, but Parks' arrest triggered protests and calls for a boycott of the bus system. Church member and WPC president Jo Ann Robinson and pastor Dr. King emerged as leaders of the boycott movement and the Dexter Avenue Church became their de facto headquarters. Initially planned for just one day, the boycott lasted 381 days and ended only when the laws requiring segregated buses were struck down as unconstitutional.

Lacey, who was teaching science at George Washington Carver High School by then, was very active in the boycott, working, she says, as a "gofer." She attended meetings and typed press releases for the movement. Many of the participants in the boycott were domestic workers who didn't own cars and relied on the bus system for their jobs. In addition to driving them herself, Lacey was an enthusiastic fundraiser for taxi drivers who supported the boycott by offering free or discounted rides to these boycott participants. She sent letters all over the country seeking donations to help with the maintenance of the taxis.

It was during the boycott that she met her future husband, Archie Lacey. Archie was a science professor at Alabama State College and met Theodora through his involvement in the bus boycott. The couple's courtship was brief, and they married on April 29, 1956, amid the boycott. Dr. King had planned to officiate at the wedding, but was called away to New York on business; he did later baptize two of their four children.

Once the boycott ended, the Laceys' civil rights activism continued. In the summer of 1957, she and her husband traveled throughout Alabama researching voter registration and injustice in the political system. Their research was used to support litigation against disenfranchisement of black voters in the state.

== Relocation to New Jersey ==
In the late 1950s, the family, with their three-year-old son, Archie Jr., relocated north from Louisiana, where she had been teaching, to escape the racism and segregation of the South. After a few years in Manhattan near Hunter College, where her husband was a professor, they moved to Teaneck, New Jersey, in 1961. Though they had left Jim Crow laws behind in the South, they still experienced racism. Some neighbors moved out and some did not want black children in their school; a next door neighbor sat in his yard with a shotgun while their children played outside.

=== Fair Housing Council of Northern New Jersey ===
They soon joined a group that worked to change discriminatory housing practices. Their organization, the Fair Housing Council of Northern New Jersey, tested home sellers and real estate brokers by pretending to be interested in buying a house listed for sale, first sending a black family who would find the house was no longer on the market, followed by a white family who would be invited to negotiate. Lacey recalled that they'd never found anyone willing to sell to a black family. The council maintained a list of sellers and brokers who participated in this discrimination, and years later, with the passage of the 1968 federal Fair Housing Act prohibiting racial discrimination in the sale and rental of houses and apartments, the Fair Housing Council used the information from the test couples in federal court as part of a major lawsuit.

=== North East Community Organization ===
They also led a group that fought discrimination in the neighborhood school, the Bryant School. Fearing that an exodus of white families from the neighborhoods would result in a loss of resources and funding for the school, the Laceys founded the North East Community Organization (NECO), which worked to integrate the public schools. They held meetings in their home with parents and community members, approached district officials, and attended school board meetings. NECO advocated for an "open enrollment" policy, allowing Teaneck families to opt out of their neighborhood school and send their children to any school in the district. Thirteen black families and one white family participated. The policy was changed in 1964, when the Teaneck school board voted to make the Bryant School the town's central and only middle school, ending the de facto racial segregation of smaller neighborhood schools. With that decision, Teaneck became the first town in the United States to integrate its schools through a vote.

== Education career, community leadership and family ==
Lacey completed her MA at Hunter College in New York City in 1965, and was a teacher for 42 years until her retirement in 2007.

She is the co-chair of the county African-American Advisory Committee and the Bergen County Martin Luther King Jr. Monument Committee, which was established in 2010 to raise money and erect a life-size bronze sculpture of King in the county. In 2014 the governor appointed her to New Jersey's Martin Luther King Jr. Commission.

In 2003, Lacey co-founded Teens Talk About Racism (TTAR), an annual diversity conference for high school students throughout Bergen County. TTAR brings youth leaders together to collaborate and lead school diversity work. Through activities that foster empathy and dialogue, students learn to recognize thought patterns that may be barriers to respectful communication. Moving from a place of deeper understanding, students return to their campuses to create action plans for a more inclusive school culture.

Lacey was selected as a delegate to represent New Jersey in the Citizen to Citizen Exchange Program trip to Russia.

In 2011 she joined the People's Organization for Progress in calling on Congress to institute a jobs program modeled on the Works Progress Administration. The campaign called for 381 days of protest, reflecting the length of the Montgomery bus boycott sixty years earlier.

She has four children, and, as of 2012, ten grandchildren and ten great-grandchildren. Her husband, Dr. Archie Lacey, died in 1986.

== Awards and honors ==
Theodora Lacey is the recipient of numerous awards, including the Master Teacher Award from the Teacher Training Institute, Teacher of the Year Award from Teaneck, Outstanding Educator award from the Teaneck Chamber of Commerce, Outstanding Women of New Jersey from the New Jersey Senate, and Most Outstanding Secondary School Teacher from Princeton University. In addition, she was honored by the Bergen Record as one of the "Most Intriguing People", listed in Who's Who America's Teachers and is the recipient of several awards from local diversity organizations, including the Sojourner Truth Award, the Negro Business and Professional Women of Bergen County, Lifetime Achievement Award Bergen County Urban League, Omega Psi Phi fraternity Community Service Award, Matthew Feldman Community Service Award, and the NAACP Service Award and the Trailblazer Award from Councilwoman Lizette Parker.

The Bergen County YWCA Theodora Lacey Racial Justice Award is as annual award given in her name to individuals or groups who recognized for lifelong commitment and work toward the elimination of racism.

Theodora Smiley Lacey School in Teaneck, New Jersey, of Teaneck Public Schools, opened in 2020. The stretch of Teaneck's Broad Street on which the school sits is also named for her.
