= Harvey B. Scribner =

American politician (1914–2002)

Harvey Bertram Scribner (July 7, 1914 – December 23, 2002) was an American educator and administrator who oversaw the voluntary integration of the Teaneck Public Schools in the mid-1960s. He also headed the Vermont Department of Education. Later, in the 1970s, he served as New York City Schools Chancellor where he dealt with issues of the transfer of greater control to local community school boards.

== Early life ==
Scribner was born on July 7, 1914, in Albion, Maine. Following high school, Scribner found work on Matinicus Isle, a remote island located 20 miles (32 km) off the coast of Maine accessible by ferry from Rockland. After a series of odd jobs to make a living, he found work as a teacher at a school in Unity, Maine, having left a teacher training course before its completion. He was awarded an undergraduate degree from Farmington State Teachers College, graduating in 1946, then earned a master's in education from the University of Maine in 1960 and was granted a doctorate in education from Boston University in 1960.

== School superintendent ==
After working as chief school administrator in Dedham, Massachusetts starting in 1954, Scribner was hired in 1961 by the Teaneck Public Schools to serve as superintendent of the district. There he oversaw the adoption of mandatory busing in 1965 in which Teaneck voluntarily integrated its public schools. Despite angry phone calls from some parents and the occasional death threat, Teaneck's integration went smoothly and Scribner recalled that he was "literally crying" on the first day of school in 1965 when buses rolled into school without incident. Teaneck's 1965 busing plan made it the first district in the nation with a white majority to implement a voluntary school integration program. Scribner moved to Vermont in 1968 to head that state's schools, where he supported greater local oversight and control of school districts.

== Chancellor ==
Scribner was selected as New York City Schools Chancellor in 1970, having been selected for the position after a series of notables including Ramsey Clark, Sargent Shriver and Cyrus Vance had been offered the post. During his tenure as chancellor, oversaw the process under which 32 local school boards were given control of community elementary schools. Scribner left the post in 1973, citing his belief that the New York City Board of Education and the teachers unions had worked to undermine local control, later saying that "I don't think decentralization ever was set up to work".

== University career ==
He joined the faculty of the University of Massachusetts Amherst, where he taught education and administration. He was co-author of the 1975 book Make Your Schools Work: Practical, Imaginative and Cost-Free Plans to Turn Public Education Around published by Simon & Schuster.

Scribner died at age 88 on December 23, 2002, in Waterville, Maine. He was survived by three daughters, six grandchildren and seven great-grandchildren.

Academic offices
Preceded by Irving Anker	Schools Chancellor of New York City; 1970-1973	Succeeded by Frank Macchiarola
