= Anthony Crowell =

- Born: Anthony W. Crowell; August 25, 1970 (age 56); Long Branch, New Jersey, U.S.
- Education: University of Pennsylvania (BA); American University (JD)
- Occupations: Dean and President of New York Law School; Former Counselor to Michael Bloomberg

Anthony Crowell (born August 25, 1970) is the current Dean and President of New York Law School. He started in May 2012 after serving for more than 10 years as Counselor to New York City Mayor Michael Bloomberg. He has taught courses in state and local government law at New York Law School and Brooklyn Law School. He is a former board member of the New York City Economic Development Corporation and was the mayoral appointee to the New York City Conflicts of Interest Board between 2013 and 2021. He serves on the New York City Planning Commission, the executive committee of the Association of American Law Schools, the board of the Brooklyn Public Library, the board of Citizens Union Foundation, the board of the Commission on Independent Colleges and Universities in New York, is a member of, and is the chair of the Independent Review Committee that reviews appointments to New York's Commission on Ethics and Lobbying in Government.

== Education and early career ==
Crowell received a B.A., magna cum laude, in 1992 from the University of Pennsylvania, where he studied urban policy, and a J.D., cum laude, from American University's Washington College of Law in 1997. He is a member of the bars of New York and New Jersey. From 1992 to 1997, after college and through law school, Crowell worked at the International City/County Management Association (ICMA) in Washington, D.C., managing the association's government affairs and policy committee.

== New York City Government ==
After law school, Crowell served as Assistant Corporation Counsel in the New York City Law Department, in its Tax & Condemnation Division and Legal Counsel Division (1997–2002). In 2001, he directed New York City's World Trade Center Death Certificate Program and was counsel at the city's Family Assistance Center, aiding families of victims of the September 11 attacks. In these roles, Crowell facilitated cross-agency cooperation to fast-track death certificates and paperwork for victims of the attacks of September 11. Crowell also oversaw the direction of aid to the victims' families.

Crowell served as Special Counsel to New York City Mayor Michael R. Bloomberg from 2002 to 2006. In 2004, Crowell wrote the key legal opinion supporting the Bloomberg administration’s decision to honor same-sex marriages performed in Canada and Massachusetts. In 2005, Crowell led the development of the nonpartisan Video Voter Guide. The guide informed NYC voters and gave free TV airtime to all candidates who wished to participate during the 2005 New York City election.

Crowell was then appointed Counselor to Mayor Bloomberg, serving in that capacity until 2012. In that role, he managed legal, regulatory, legislative, governance, administrative, and operational matters focused on enhancing the performance, competitiveness, accountability, and public integrity of New York City. He also coordinated and oversaw New York City agencies, boards, and commissions, and led government reform efforts and business process reengineering initiatives.

In October 2008, Crowell delivered testimony, along with Corporation Counsel Michael Cardozo, on Intro. 845-A before the New York City Council Committee on Governmental Operations, concerning the extension of term limits. He also chaired the Regulatory Review Panel, which sought to streamline rules to reduce fines and undue burden on city businesses.

Crowell served on all four of Mayor Bloomberg's NYC Charter Revision Commissions. Crowell was appointed to be Co-Executive Director of the 2002 Charter Revision Commission, which placed a ballot proposal that dealt with Mayoral succession. He was appointed as Chief Counsel to the 2003 Charter Revision Commission, which placed a proposal on the ballot to have a nonpartisan voting system for all elected city offices. Crowell served as a member of the 2004 Commission, which reviewed the budget, judicial conduct, and other practices outlined in the city charter. Crowell also served as a member of the 2010 Commission, which primarily dealt with the proposed extension of mayoral term limits. In 2022, Crowell was appointed by Mayor Eric Adams to the City Planning Commission.

== Academic career ==
Crowell was named Dean and President of New York Law School in February 2012, following a unanimous vote of the Law School's board of trustees. He also joined the faculty as professor of law and distinguished practitioner. He originally joined New York Law School in 2003 as an adjunct professor and continues to teach a course on New York City law there. He previously taught a course in state and local government law at Brooklyn Law School for 12 years.

After being appointed Dean in 2012, Crowell set out to improve NYLS’ rankings and reintroduce NYLS as “New York’s Law School”. In 2012, after being appointed Dean, Crowell introduced the Jump Start bar prep program to help students pass the accreditation exam. From 2012 to 2013, New York Law School saw the highest jump in bar passage rate in New York State.

Since joining the school full-time, Crowell has worked with the faculty to develop the school's new top-to-bottom Strategic Plan. The plan embraces the structural changes in the legal marketplace, focuses on student and community engagement, scholarship, and has helped to shepherd a historic expansion of clinical and experiential learning using New York City as the classroom. The Strategic Plan was informed by a full scale operational review that the Dean and his team undertook to evaluate and implement new methods required for modern law school management.

In September 2013, Crowell announced that New York Law School would offer a two-year J.D. honors program, beginning in January 2015, which will cost no more than two-thirds of a traditional J.D. program at the Law School. In recognition of the two-year program and other innovations, Crains New York Business included him in its list of “People to Watch in Higher Education.” Crowell was also interviewed by New York Public Radio and Bloomberg Law about the two-year program.

In April 2015, Crowell announced the creation of a partnership between NYLS and the University of Rochester's Simon Business School. The partnership combines the educational capacities of both institutions to provide a collaborative legal and business education for students in NYLS’ Tribeca campus. Crowell has also overseen the development of the Joe Plumeri Center for Social Justice and Economic Opportunity, which supports free legal services provided by the NYLS pro bono law firm through a $5 million gift from businessman Joe Plumeri.

Under Crowell's leadership, NYLS has risen from unranked in 2013 to #111 in 2016 in U.S. News & World Report's annual U.S. law school rankings.

The Brooklyn Chamber of Commerce awarded Crowell the "Building Brooklyn Award" in 2013. Crowell introduced the "Campus Climate Survey" at NYLS to gauge and monitor the school's diversity, equity, and inclusion (DEI) plans and policies. He authored a chapter on civics education in Beyond Imagination? The January 6 Insurrection about the January 6 United States Capitol attack.

== Professional Affiliations ==
- In 1987, Crowell received a bronze Congressional Award and he serves on the Award Foundation's Board in Washington.
- Brooklyn Public Library Board of Trustees – current member; former chairman
- Brooklyn Chamber of Commerce Board of Directors
- Citizens Union Foundation Board of Directors
- NYC Conflicts of Interest Board
- Chair of New York State's Independent Review Committee
- Executive Committee of The Association of American Law Schools
- Trustee of the Commission on Independent Colleges & Universities in New York

== Selected publications, articles, and op-eds ==
- Real Estate Issues: Toxic Tax Assessments - The Ad Valorem Assessment of Contaminated Property
- ICMA: Local Government and the Telecommunications Act of 1996
- ICMA: Playing in the Gray: Quality of Life and the Municipal Bond Rating Game
- New York Law Journal: Benefits of Urban Law Schools for Students
- NYLS Law Review: Forward on History of Charter Revisions
