= Local Law 51 of 2008 =

2008 New York City local law extending term limits

Local Law No. 51 of 2008

New York City Council
- Long title: A Local Law to amend the New York City Charter, in relation to term limits for elected officials.
- Territorial extent: New York City
- Enacted: October 23, 2008
- Signed: November 3, 2008
- Commenced: November 3, 2008
- Introduced by: Simcha Felder (by request of the Mayor)
- Status: Amended

Local Law 51 of 2008 is a New York City local law that amended the New York City Charter to increase the maximum number of consecutive full terms that the mayor, public advocate, comptroller, borough presidents, and members of the New York City Council may serve from two to three. The Council approved the measure on October 23, 2008, by a vote of 29–22, and Mayor Michael Bloomberg signed it into law on November 3, 2008.

The law allowed incumbents then in office to seek a third consecutive term in the 2009 New York City elections, including Bloomberg, who was subsequently re-elected to a third term as mayor.

Local Law 51 was noteworthy because New York City voters had previously approved a two-term limit by referendum in 1993 but had rejected an extension to three terms in 1996.

In 2010, a charter revision referendum reduced the limit back to two consecutive terms for officials first elected at or after the 2010 general election and restricted the council's ability to alter term limits for sitting officeholders, effectively superseding Local Law 51 for future officials.

== Background ==
Until the early 1990s, New York City did not impose term limits on its municipal elected officials. In a citywide referendum held on November 2, 1993, voters approved amendments to the City Charter that limited the mayor, public advocate, comptroller, borough presidents, and City Council members to two consecutive four-year terms.

A subsequent 1996 ballot proposal that would have extended the limit from two to three terms was defeated by voters. As a result, the two-term limit remained in place and first applied to City officeholders elected in 2001.

By 2008, Mayor Bloomberg and many Council members faced the end of their second consecutive terms in office. Supporters of extending term limits argued that allowing experienced officials to serve an additional term would provide continuity during the global financial crisis and give voters more choice. Opponents contended that changing a voter-approved term limits scheme by local law rather than by referendum undermined the earlier popular votes and benefited incumbents.

== Legislative history ==
On October 2, 2008, Bloomberg and Council Speaker Christine Quinn announced that term limits legislation would be introduced in the council. The bill, later enacted as Local Law 51, was formally introduced by Council Member Simcha Felder "by request of the Mayor."

After hearings before the council's Committee on Governmental Operations, the full Council voted on the measure on October 23, 2008. A proposed amendment that would have required a public referendum on changing term limits was defeated earlier that day. The bill then passed the Council 29–22 and was signed by Mayor Bloomberg on November 3, 2008.

Local Law 51 amended Charter sections 1137 and 1138 to permit the mayor, public advocate, comptroller, borough presidents, and Council members to serve up to three consecutive full terms in office, instead of two.

Because portions of New York City were then covered by section 5 of the Voting Rights Act of 1965, the City submitted Local Law 51 to the United States Department of Justice for federal "preclearance." The Justice Department reviewed the submission and allowed the law to go into effect in January 2009.

== Legal challenges ==
Local Law 51 was quickly challenged in federal court in Molinari v. Bloomberg by a group that included former Staten Island borough president Guy Molinari, Public Advocate Betsy Gotbaum, several Council members who had voted against the bill, prospective candidates, and civic organizations. The plaintiffs argued that Local Law 51 violated the U.S. Constitution, New York State law, and the City Charter, including claims that changing voter-adopted term limits without a referendum infringed on the rights of voters and created conflicts of interest for Council members who stood to benefit personally from the change.

In January 2009, the United States District Court for the Eastern District of New York granted summary judgment to the defendants, upholding the law. The United States Court of Appeals for the Second Circuit affirmed in April 2009, holding that there is no federal constitutional right to legislate by initiative, that the law did not violate substantive due process, and that state and local law did not require a referendum in order to amend the Charter's term-limit provisions.

== 2009 elections and political impact ==
Local Law 51 applied to the 2009 municipal election cycle, allowing Bloomberg and other term-limited officials to seek a third consecutive term. Bloomberg ran as the incumbent and was re-elected to a third term in November 2009, while a number of other officeholders also pursued and in some cases won third terms.

The extension of term limits was widely debated in local media and among good-government organizations, many of which criticized the council's action and called for future changes to be made only by referendum.

== 2010 charter revision and subsequent changes ==
In 2010, Mayor Bloomberg appointed a new Charter Revision Commission, which placed two ballot questions before voters in the November 2, 2010 general election. City Question 1 proposed to revise term limits by (1) reducing the maximum number of consecutive full terms from three back to two; (2) applying this change only to officials first elected at or after the 2010 general election; and (3) prohibiting the City Council from altering the term limits of current officeholders.

Voters approved Question 1, thereby restoring a two-term consecutive limit for future officials while allowing those first elected before the 2010 general election to remain eligible for three consecutive terms under Local Law 51. As a result, Local Law 51 remains part of the legislative history of New York City's term limits but no longer governs the eligibility of officials first elected after 2010.

== See also ==
- New York City mayoral elections
- Term limits in the United States
- Mayoralty of Michael Bloomberg
- New York City Charter
