= Safe Passage Project =

American nonprofit organization

Safe Passage Project Corporation is a non-profit legal services organization that provides free lawyers to refugee and immigrant children in the New York City-area who face deportation.

== Descriptions ==
Safe Passage Project serves immigrant children in New York City and Long Island under age 21. The Safe Passage Project attorneys represent immigrant children in immigration court. Safe Passage protects their legal right to be heard and to have a fair process to determine if they may remain permanently in the United States. Safe Passage Project recruits, trains, and mentors pro bono attorneys.

== History ==
Safe Passage Project was founded by Lenni Benson, in 2006. In May 2013, Safe Passage Project was incorporated in the State of New York as a section 501(c)(3) charitable nonprofit organization. In 2016, the board named Rich Leimsider as the first paid Executive Director.

== Accomplishments ==
As of 2019, Safe Passage Project has provided more than 800 immigrant children with full free legal representation, and has won 90% of their cases.

Safe Passage Project has assisted more than 1,500 children by securing pro bono representation and mentoring attorneys. The organization has helped additional children through screening clinics and know your rights presentations. Safe Passage Project has mentored over 400 attorneys working with law student volunteers.

Safe Passage received the 2008 New York State Bar Association outstanding pro bono project, and the 2013 American Immigration Lawyers Association Pro Bono Hero award.
