= Donald Sullivan =

American academic

Brother Donald Sullivan

16th President of St. Francis College
- In office 1969–1995
- Preceded by: Brother Urban Gonnoud, O.S.F.
- Succeeded by: Frank Macchiarola

Personal details
- Born: 1931 (age 94–95)
- Education: Fordham University (B.A.); New York University (M.A.); St. John's University (Ph.D.)

Brother Donald Sullivan, OSF was an American academic of Canadian descent. From 1969 to 1995, Sullivan served as the 16th President of St. Francis College in Brooklyn, New York. His 26 years as president is the longest at St. Francis College.

Brother Sullivan served on several boards including the Helen Keller Services for the Blind and Ridgewood Savings Bank. He also was director of the Brooklyn Chamber of Commerce and the Downtown Brooklyn Development Association.

== St. Francis College ==
Brother Sullivan took over after Brother Urban Gonnoud resigned in 1969, he served as president for 11 years prior to resigning. Brother Sullivan was 38 years old when he took over. During Brother Sullivan's tenure, St. Francis College became coeducational and its enrollment exceeded 3,000 students for the first time in its history. He also oversaw the construction of the Generoso Pope Athletic Complex in 1971.
