= Teaneck Public Schools =

School district in Bergen County, New Jersey, US

Address
- 655 Teaneck Road Teaneck, Bergen County, New Jersey, 07666; United States
- Coordinates: 40°53′14″N 74°00′26″W

District information
- Grades: Pre-K to 12
- Superintendent: Andre D. Spencer
- Business administrator: Victor Anaya
- Schools: 8

Students and staff
- Enrollment: 3,487 (as of 2023–24)
- Faculty: 305.2 FTEs
- Student–teacher ratio: 11.4:1

Other information
- District Factor Group: GH
- Website: www.teaneckschools.org
Ind.	Per pupil	District spending	Rank (*)	K–12 average	%± vs. average
1A	Total Spending	$24,019	97	$18,891	27.1%
1	Budgetary Cost	19,036	101	14,783	28.8%
2	Classroom Instruction	11,698	101	8,763	33.5%
6	Support Services	3,224	96	2,392	34.8%
8	Administrative Cost	1,674	86	1,485	12.7%
10	Operations & Maintenance	2,111	88	1,783	18.4%
13	Extracurricular Activities	327	82	268	22.0%
16	Median Teacher Salary	76,404	93	64,043
Data from NJDoE 2014 Taxpayers' Guide to Education Spending. *Of K–12 districts with more than 3,500 students. Lowest spending=1; Highest=103

The Teaneck Public Schools is comprehensive community public school district serving students in pre-kindergarten through twelfth grade in Teaneck, Bergen County, in the U.S. state of New Jersey.

As of the 2023–24 school year, the district, comprised of eight schools, had an enrollment of 3,487 students and 305.2 classroom teachers (on an FTE basis), for a student–teacher ratio of 11.4:1.

== Awards and recognition ==
The Teaneck Public Schools have been recognized by the New Jersey Department of Education as part of its Best practices program. The district was awarded in the 1997–98 school year for its Passport Portfolio Program, and in the 2000–01 school year for its Early Literacy Initiative.

== History ==
Harvey B. Scribner, who later served as New York City School Chancellor, was hired in 1961 by the Teaneck Public Schools to serve as superintendent of the district. There he oversaw the adoption of mandatory busing in 1965 in which Teaneck voluntarily integrated its public schools. Despite angry phone calls from some parents and the occasional death threat, Teaneck's integration went smoothly and Scribner recalled that he was "literally crying" on the first day of school in 1965 when buses rolled into school without incident. Teaneck's 1965 busing plan was widely reported as the first district in the nation with a white majority to implement a voluntary school integration program.

A 1982 teachers strike that lasted for 19 days was settled after a judge threatened to jail striking teachers and pressured the board of education to negotiate an agreement.

The district had been classified by the New Jersey Department of Education as being in District Factor Group "GH", the third-highest of eight groupings. District Factor Groups organize districts statewide, ostensibly to allow comparison by common socioeconomic characteristics of the local districts. From lowest socioeconomic status to highest, the categories are A, B, CD, DE, FG, GH, I and J. However, because socioeconomic data is derived from the municipality as a whole and a significant proportion of Teaneck's more affluent families send their children to parochial or other private schools, the usefulness of District Factor Grouping in the Teaneck district's case is disputed.

Defunct schools in the district include:

- Eugene Field School – Constructed in 1956. Used as Board of Education Central Administration Offices. School #8. Named for poet and humorist Eugene Field. Repurposed as Theodora Smiley Lacey School in 2020.
- Emerson Elementary School – Built in 1916. Original School #3. Named for author, essayist, and 19th century philosopher Ralph Waldo Emerson.
- Washington Irving School – Built in 1906. Original School #2. Named for author Washington Irving.
- Longfellow Elementary School – School #1. Named for poet Henry Wadsworth Longfellow. Opened in 1910, the school was closed in 1998. The building was acquired in 2017 for $4.3 million as the site of the Al Ummah Community Center.

== Schools ==
Schools in the district, with 2023–24 enrollment data from the National Center for Education Statistics, are:

Preschools

- Bryant Elementary School (school 6) with 265 students in PreK and Kindergarten
  - Built in 1927, the school is named for poet and journalist William Cullen Bryant.
  - David Deubel, principal
- Theodora Smiley Lacey Elementary School with 134 students in PreK and Kindergarten. Opened in September 2020.
  - Leslie King, principal

Elementary schools

- Hawthorne Elementary School (school 5) with 324 students in grades K–4. Built in 1925, the school is named for author Nathaniel Hawthorne.
  - Emilio Jennette, principal
- Lowell Elementary School (school 7) with 305 students in grades K–4. Built in 1935, the school is named for author James Russell Lowell.
  - Pedro Valdes, principal
- Whittier Elementary School (school 4) with 373 students in grades K–4. Built in 1923, the school is named for John Greenleaf Whittier.
  - Debra Nussbaum, principal

Middle schools

- Benjamin Franklin Middle School with 485 students in grades 5–8. Named for founding father and inventor Benjamin Franklin.
  - Terrence Williams, principal
- Thomas Jefferson Middle School with 525 students in grades 5–8. Built in 1956, named for American president Thomas Jefferson.
  - Nina Odatalla, principal

High school

- Teaneck High School with 1,261 students in grades 9–12. Built in 1928.
  - Piero LoGiudice, principal

== Controversy ==
Teaneck has received attention in the media due to sexual crimes committed against minors by faculty members. Joseph White, former principal of Teaneck High School, pleaded guilty to official child endangerment in June 2006 and was sentenced to one year in prison. White had been charged in 2002 with fondling a 17-year-old student and was subsequently acquitted. James Darden, an award-winning former eighth grade teacher at Thomas Jefferson Middle School, was charged with sexual assault and misconduct in June 2007. He pleaded guilty in December 2007 to a charge of aggravated sexual assault and faces up to 8 1/2 years in prison when sentenced on January 18, 2008.

== Administration ==
Core members of the district's administration are:

- Andre D. Spencer, superintendent
- Victor Anaya, school business administrator / board secretary

== Board of education ==
The district's board of education, comprised of nine members, sets policy and oversees the fiscal and educational operation of the district through its administration. As a Type II school district, the board's trustees are elected directly by voters to serve three-year terms of office on a staggered basis, with three seats up for election each year held (since 2012) as part of the November general election. The board appoints a superintendent to oversee the district's day-to-day operations and a business administrator to supervise the business functions of the district.
