= Robert Blecker Wants Me Dead =

- Theatrical release poster
- Directed by: Ted Schillinger
- Produced by: Bruce David Klein
- Starring: Robert Blecker
- Cinematography: Ted Schillinger; Matthew Howe
- Edited by: Kendrick Simmons
- Release dates: April 25, 2008 (USA Film Festival); February 27, 2009
- Running time: 90 minutes
- Country: United States
- Language: English

Robert Blecker Wants Me Dead is an independent documentary film about retributivist death penalty advocate Robert Blecker and his relationship with Daryl Holton, a death row inmate who murdered his own four children, and who was executed by the state of Tennessee in September 2007. The film was directed by Ted Schillinger and produced by Bruce David Klein.

The film was completed in November 2007 and made its world premiere on April 25, 2008, at the USA Film Festival in Dallas, Texas, as an official selection of the festival. The film was also an official selection of the 2008 Rhode Island Film Festival and the 2008 Cork Film Festival. It won a Gold Kahuna Award at the 2009 Honolulu International Film Festival.

Robert Blecker Wants Me Dead was released theatrically on February 27, 2009. The New York Times said the film was "compelling" and Film Journal International called it "captivating." The Washington Post described it as a fascinating look at "the vast amount of wiggle room between being for the death penalty and being against it." The film made its television premiere on April 19, 2009, on MSNBC. It was released on DVD in 2010.
