= Frank Macchiarola =

American academic (1941–2012)

Frank J. Macchiarola

17th President of St. Francis College
- In office 1996–2008
- Preceded by: Brother Donald Sullivan, O.S.F., M.A., Ph.D.
- Succeeded by: Brendan J. Dugan

Personal details
- Born: April 7, 1941 Brooklyn, New York
- Died: December 18, 2012 (aged 71) Brooklyn, New York
- Spouse: Mary Macchiarola
- Education: St. Francis College (B.A.); Columbia Law School (LL.B.) Columbia University (Ph.D.)
- Profession: Lawyer

Frank J. Macchiarola (April 7, 1941 – December 18, 2012), was an American academic. His interests and expertise spanned the legal, academic, executive management and public service areas. From 2008 until his death, Macchiarola was the Chancellor of St. Francis College, after having been the college's president from 1996 to 2008. His grandson, Daniel Macchiarola, was drafted by the Seattle Mariners in 2025.

== Education ==
Macchiarola grew up in Flatbush, Brooklyn, obtained his B.A. in History from St. Francis College in 1962 and subsequently his LL.B. from Columbia Law School and Ph.D. from Columbia University.

== Career ==
Macchiarola held various positions at New York City educational institutions, including Columbia University, Yeshiva University, City College of New York, and St. Francis College. Prior to holding the aforementioned positions at Higher Education institutions, Macchiarola served as the New York City School Chancellor, where he supervised the educational program of over a million students. During that time, 1978–1983, he also was the deputy director of the New York State Emergency Financial Control Board for New York City. Next, Macchiarola was president and chief executive officer of the New York City Partnership, Inc., from 1983 to 1988.

Concurrently, Macchiarola was a faculty member at the City University of New York from 1964 to 1985, where he served at City College of New York, Baruch College, and Graduate School, leaving as professor of political science on the doctoral faculty. He served as vice president of the City University Graduate School and as director of the CUNY Urban Academy for Management. From 1988 to 1991, he served as professor of business in Columbia University's Graduate School of Business with teaching and research interests in business law, government regulation of business and nonprofit management. He also served as chair of the advisory committee of the Columbia Business School Community Collaboration and served on doctoral panels in political science and education. He was also a professor of education at Teachers College of Columbia University and has been president of The Academy of Political Science. After leaving Columbia University, Macchiarola served as dean and professor of law at the Benjamin N. Cardozo School of Law of Yeshiva University where he taught Legal Process, Contracts and Legal Writing, from 1991 to 1996. In July 2008, he assumed the position of Chancellor of St. Francis College after being the colleges president from 1996 to 2008.

=== St. Francis College ===
During his tenure as President of St. Francis College, Macchiarola oversaw the construction of the Anthony J. Genovesi Athletic Center and the Academic Center which was later renamed to the Frank & Mary Macchiarola Center in his and his wife's honor. He also oversaw the implementation of a 5-year combined Accounting B.S./M.S. program.

== Public service ==
In the public service arena, Macchiarola was appointed in 2003 by Mayor Michael Bloomberg to serve as chair of the New York City Charter Revision Commission. He was also appointed by Governor George Pataki to the New York State Commission on Education Reform, he served as chairman of the New York State Higher Education Services Commission. At Mayor Bloomberg's request, in 2003, Macchiarola mediated the strike of Local 802 Musicians Union against the League of American Theatres and Producers, which had shut down Broadway. He was also chair of the New York City Districting Commission, which drew City Council District lines for the 1991 election and acted as special referee in the case that drew New York State congressional lines for the 1992 election. He was a member of President Jimmy Carter's Impact Aid Commission, New York City Charter Revision Commissions, New York City Campaign Finance Board, New York City Water Board and New York City Tax Study Commission. He was a member of numerous civic boards including the Academy of Political Science, Manhattan Institute, Brooklyn Children's Museum, and New York City Police Department Board of Visitors. Since 2004, he was a member of the American Bar Association Committee on Law School Accreditation and was a consultant to and director of several corporations, and sat on the board of the Manville Personal Injury Settlement Trust. He served as counsel to the New York State Assembly Committee on Codes and Special Counsel and director of the Housing Study Group of the Scott Commission.

== Practice ==
Macchiarola served as special counsel to the New York Law firm of Tannenbaum Helpern Syracuse & Hirschtritt LLP.

== Politics ==
Macchiarola self-identified as a Blue Dog Democrat.

== Death and commemoration ==
Macchiarola died in December 2012 from liver cancer. In 2014, the former Sheepshead Bay High School in Brooklyn, NY was renamed in his honor, "the Frank J. Macchiarola Educational Complex".

== Publications ==
He was author of a number of books including three co-written with Thomas Hauser.

Academic offices
Preceded by Harvey B. Scribner	Schools Chancellor of New York City; 1978-1983	Succeeded by Richard F. Halverson
