= Brooklyn Chamber of Commerce =

Organization based in New York City

- Formation: 1918; 108 years ago
- Headquarters: 335 Adams St # 2700 Brooklyn, NY 11201
- Region served: Brooklyn, New York
- Key people: Chair; Denise Arbesu, Citi Commercial Bank; President and CEO; Andrew Hoan; Treasurer; Pasquale Patrone, CohnReznick; Secretary; Susan Doban, Doban Architecture
- Revenue: $825,253
- Staff: 368 (approx.)
- Website: www.brooklynchamber.com

The Brooklyn Chamber of Commerce serves as an advocate for member businesses across the New York City borough of Brooklyn, and also operates a nonprofit economic development arm known as the Brooklyn Alliance.

== History ==
The Brooklyn Chamber of Commerce was founded in 1918 and according to the group, has grown to become the largest chamber of commerce in the state of New York.

In December 2014, the chamber announced a partnership with Google, in which the company provided $25,000 and volunteers to assist local business owners in immigrant and low-income neighborhoods increase their online presence. Google noted that while 97% of people use the internet to find goods and services, only 50% of New York business owners were online.

In 2015, the chamber developed and began allowing companies with operations in Brooklyn to use a "Brooklyn Made" logo to help consumers easily determine which products are genuinely made in the borough, the hope being that this will encourage consumers to support their local community by purchasing local goods and bringing manufacturing jobs to the area. The three levels of certification correspond to the degree by which a particular product's manufacturing took place in Brooklyn. A product made entirely in Brooklyn might have a "gold" level certification, while one whose manufacturing took place elsewhere before being shipped to Brooklyn for finishing might carry a "silver" certification.

=== Brooklyn Alliance ===
The Brooklyn Alliance was founded in 1967 in order to support the Chamber's goals by leveraging "the Chamber's resources in order to promote economic, community, business and workforce development."

== See also ==
- Chamber of Commerce of the State of New York
- Manhattan Chamber of Commerce
