= Rose Freistater =

American schoolteacher (born 1908)

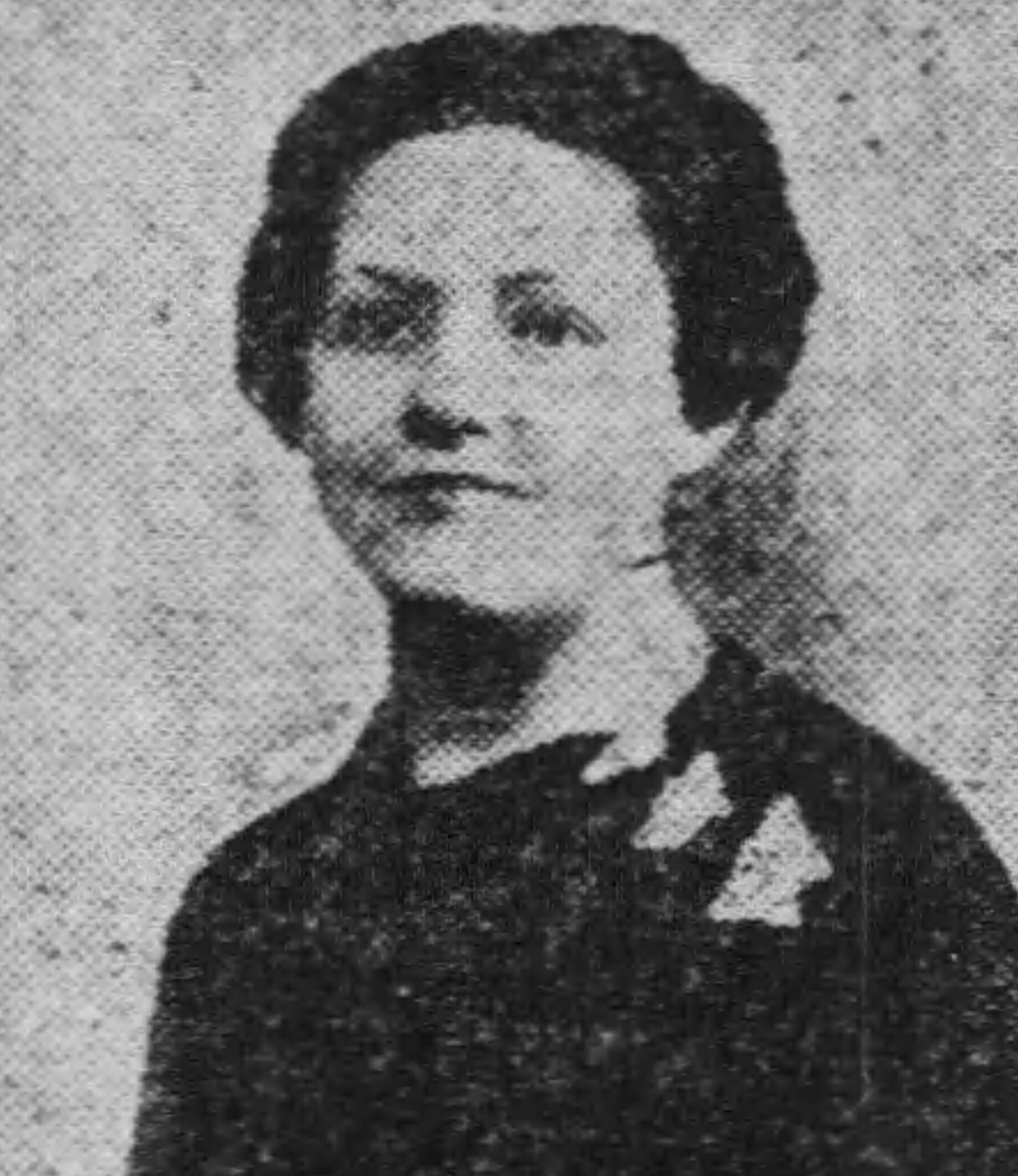
- Freistater in 1935
- Born: September 24, 1908; New York City, US
- Died: November 30, 1974; Mexico City, Mexico
- Resting place: Panteon Israelita, Mexico City
- Occupation: Schoolteacher
- Employer: James Monroe High School

Rose Freistater (born September 24, 1908, died November 30, 1974) was an American schoolteacher who rose to prominence in the 1930s when she was denied a teacher's license in New York for being overweight. While other teachers had been denied their licenses because of their weight, Freistater was the first to appeal the decision to the Commissioner of Education of the State of New York, doing so in 1935. The Commissioner refused to overturn the decision and Freistater was not issued a license. Freistater married Rafael Gardenberg in 1939 and migrated to Mexico City where she died in 1974.

== Career ==
=== Denial of teaching license ===
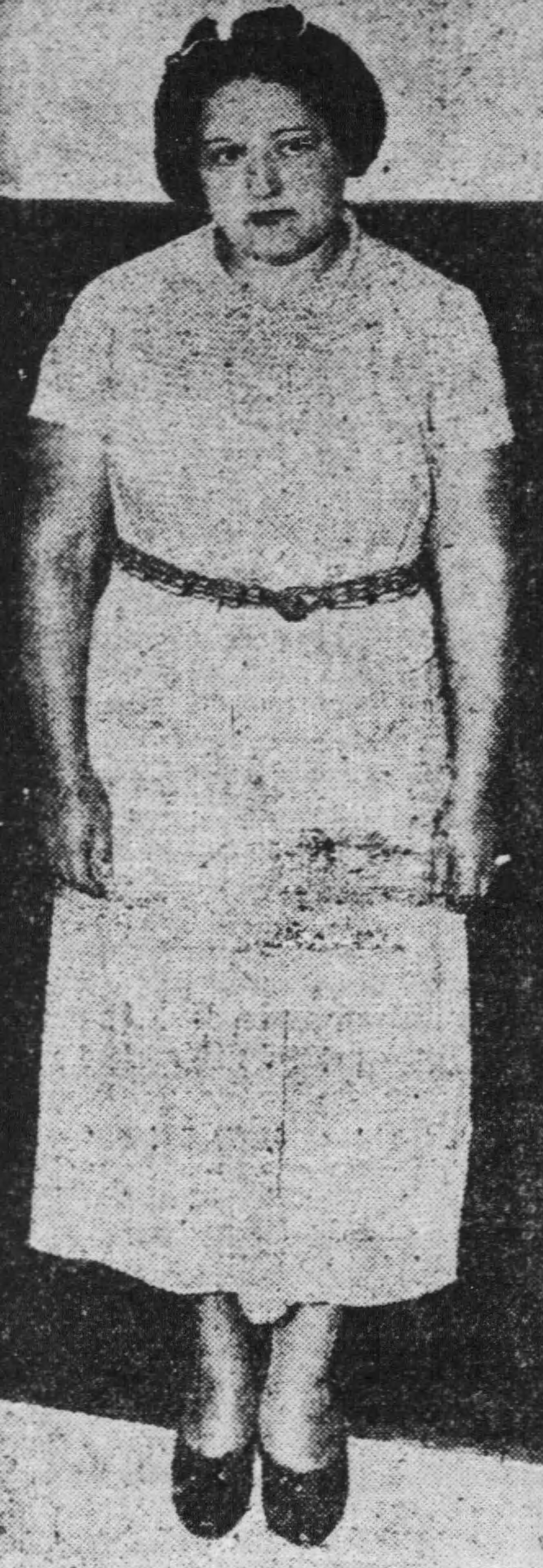
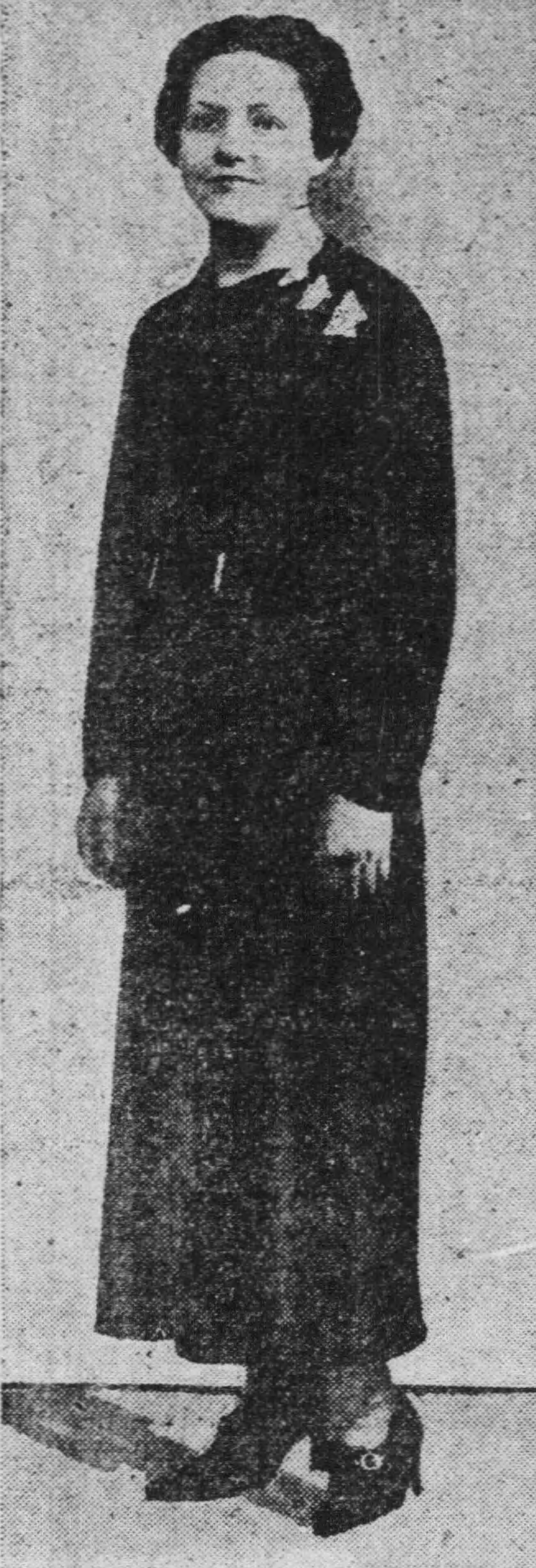
Freistater in 1931 (left) and 1935 (right)

Born on September 24, 1908, Freistater started her career as a student teacher at James Monroe High School and continued to teach there as a regular substitute for several years. In 1931 she applied for a license to teach full-time. At the time, the New York City Board of Education prescribed a maximum weight limit for teachers. At 5 feet 2 inches (157 cm) and 182 pounds (83 kg), Freistater weighed 30 pounds (14 kg) more than the limit and the board denied her application as a result. Freistater's ability as a teacher was not in question, with her supervisor stating that her teaching was "difficult to overstate in its excellence". The examiners required Freistater to lose 30 pounds (14 kg) before reconsidering her application and Freistater spent six months dieting and hiking daily, eventually dropping her weight to 160 pounds (73 kg). This did not satisfy the examiners and Freistater gave up attempting to lose weight for several years.

=== Subsequent appeals ===
In 1935, Freistater appealed the decision to the Commissioner of Education of the State of New York, becoming the first teacher to contest the weight standards. In her application, she stated that she had taught 277 school days as a substitute since her application was declined and that she had been commended by her department head as an excellent teacher. The City Board of Education opposed her appeal, arguing that it would be an undue burden on the pension fund if Freistater was to fall ill and that most rejected applicants were able to successfully lose weight. Several faculty of Columbia University's Teachers College supported Freistater's appeal, with George Counts remarking that "the matter of weight is entirely irrelevant to the question of efficiency in the classroom."

Freistater's appeal hearing was initially scheduled for August 28, 1935, but was placed on hold after Freistater retained an attorney, who helped her gather statements of support from her supervisor and the principal of James Monroe High School. On October 15, 1935, Freistater refiled her appeal through her attorney and claimed that while she had lost all the weight requested, she was unable to maintain her diet because she needed strength to act as a caretaker for her mother. While the City Board of Education again opposed her appeal, the State Commissioner scheduled a hearing for December 11, 1935.

=== Hearing and decision ===
The hearing was presided over by Frank Graves, the State Education Commissioner. Freistater's attorney argued that she should be issued a teaching license because she had cut her weight down to 154 pounds (70 kg), which brought her within the required range. He also argued that because of her mother's sudden illness, the City Board should have granted her more time to lose weight initially. Additionally, he pointed to a variety of physical exercise that Freistater regularly engaged in, including horseback riding and playing tennis. Freistater was able to produce a signed doctor's note stating that her weight gain was the result of poor diet and not any permanent health issue. In contrast, the City Board of Education argued that "the normal weight for Miss Freistater is 122 pounds (55 kg)" and that even allowing a 154-pound (70 kg) Freistater to teach full-time would pose a "risk" to the school system. After the hearing, Graves allowed both sides fifteen days to file supplemental briefs.

On January 2, 1936, the City Board of Education filed a brief which claimed that granting Freistater's appeal would "seriously hamper the educational system" by causing all denied teachers to appeal their decisions. The brief also argued that Freistater's appeal was not legitimate because she had not applied for any full-time position since her teaching license was denied. The case was closed on January 10, 1936, and the decision was left to Graves. On March 13, 1936, Graves dismissed Freistater's appeal and let the Board's decision stand. In his decision, Graves noted that while he felt it was possible the weight standard was too harsh, that he could not rule in her favor as he felt the time between the Board's denial and her appeal was too long.

== Reactions ==
The case was widely covered, both within New York and across the country. An op-ed in the Billings Gazette contrasted Freistater's situation with the case of Isabelle Hallin, a Massachusetts teacher allegedly fired for being "blonde and beautiful". Dominic Moreo, in his 1996 book Schools in the Great Depression, wrote that Freistater's case was just one example of a widespread trend of "bureaucratic missteps" in the New York City school system at that time. Jonna Perrillo, a professor of English education at the University of Texas, described the Freistater case as being indicative of standards designed to "transform the image of the teacher from a domineering schoolmarm to a compliant and capable professional."

One year after Graves refused to overturn the City Board's decision, the Board hired Joseph P. McDonald, a 287-pound (130 kg) man, as a physical education teacher after a physician certified him as "physically fit in every respect". In their coverage of the hire, the Associated Press noted the double standard.
