= John King Jr. =

American academic administrator (born 1975)

John King
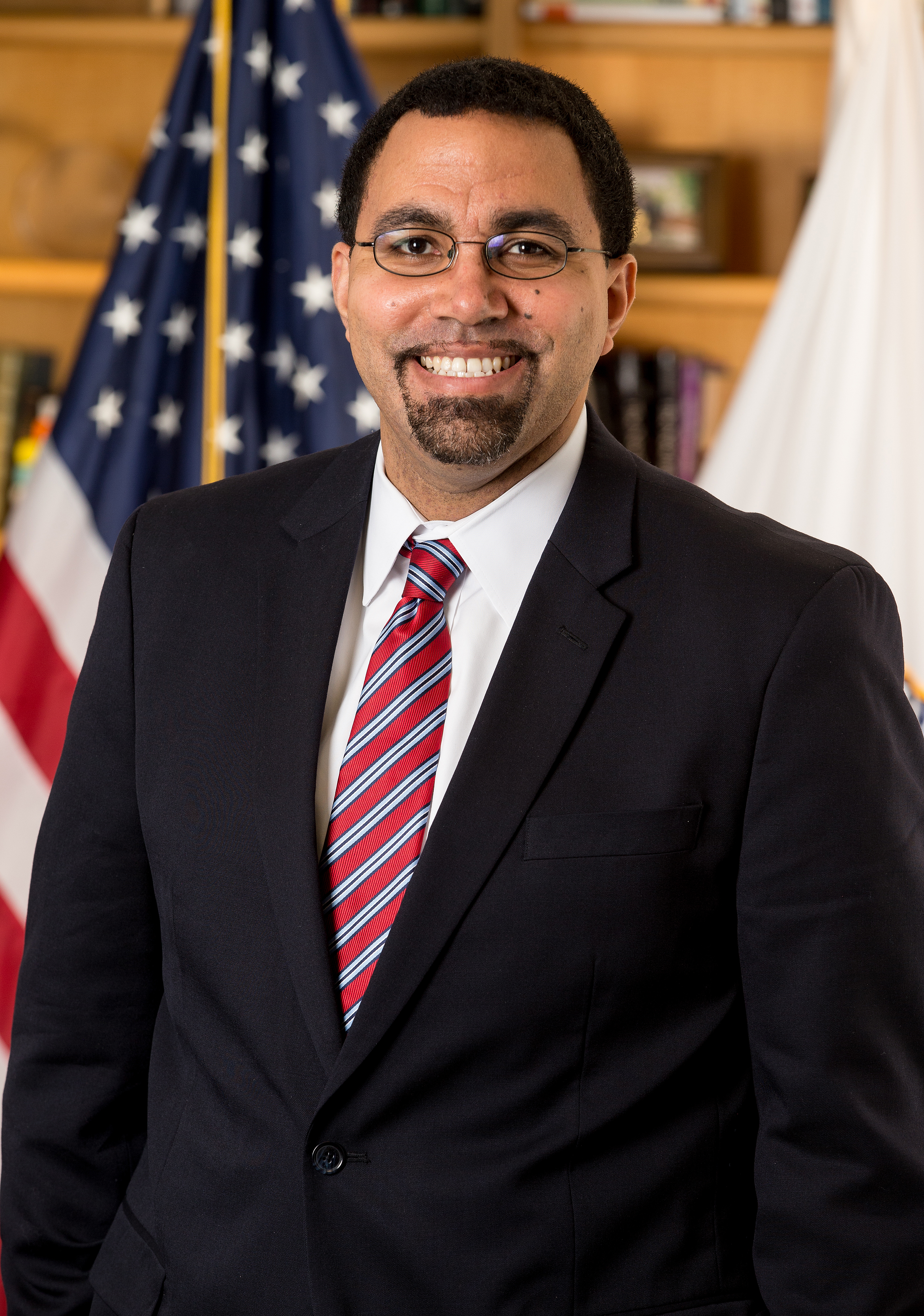
- King in 2016

15th Chancellor of the State University of New York System
- Incumbent
- Assumed office January 9, 2023
- Preceded by: Deborah F. Stanley (interim)

10th United States Secretary of Education
- In office January 1, 2016 – January 20, 2017; Acting: January 1, 2016 – March 14, 2016
- President: Barack Obama
- Deputy: James Cole Jr. (acting)
- Preceded by: Arne Duncan
- Succeeded by: Betsy DeVos

United States Deputy Secretary of Education
- In office January 4, 2015 – January 1, 2016; Acting
- President: Barack Obama
- Preceded by: Jim Shelton
- Succeeded by: James Cole Jr. (acting)

Education Commissioner of New York
- In office June 15, 2011 – January 4, 2015
- Governor: Andrew Cuomo
- Preceded by: David Steiner
- Succeeded by: MaryEllen Elia

Personal details
- Born: January 5, 1975 (age 51) New York City, New York, U.S.
- Party: Democratic
- Spouse: Melissa Steel
- Children: 2
- Education: Harvard University (BA); Columbia University (MEd, EdD); Yale University (JD)

John B. King Jr. (born January 5, 1975) is an American academic administrator, currently serving as the 15th chancellor of the State University of New York since January 2023.

He previously served as President & CEO of The Education Trust, a national civil rights nonprofit which seeks to identify and close opportunity and achievement gaps for students from preschool through college. A member of the Democratic Party, he served as the 10th United States Secretary of Education from January 1, 2016 to January 20, 2017, under President Barack Obama. In April 2021, King announced that he would be running for the Democratic nomination in the 2022 Maryland gubernatorial election, but came in sixth place in the primary election, losing to Baltimore author Wes Moore.

Immediately before he assumed leadership of the United States Department of Education, King served as its Acting Deputy Secretary from 2015 until 2016. He previously was the New York State Education Commissioner from 2011 to 2014. King's predecessor as U.S. Secretary of Education, Arne Duncan, was charged with implementing the No Child Left Behind Act; however, King was obliged to carry out the provisions of that law's modified successor legislation, the Every Student Succeeds Act.

On December 5, 2022, King was appointed Chancellor of the State University of New York, succeeding interim chancellor Deborah F. Stanley and becoming its second Black chancellor, with Clifton R. Wharton Jr. being the first, and first Puerto Rican chancellor. He took office on January 9, 2023.

== Early life and education ==
John B. King Jr. was born in 1975 in Flatlands, Brooklyn, to John B. King Sr., a retired public school administrator and teacher, and Adalinda King, a school guidance counselor. He is of African-American and Puerto Rican descent. King Sr. had been Brooklyn's first Black principal and later became New York City's executive deputy superintendent of schools. King Jr.'s mother died of a heart attack when King was eight years old. His father developed Alzheimer's disease and later died when King was 12. When later describing the importance of education, King credits one of his New York City public school teachers with saving him from being "shot or in prison" following the trauma caused by his parents' deaths. King moved to Long Island to live with his 24-year-old half brother. King later attended Phillips Andover but rebelled against its rules and was expelled in his junior year. He moved in with his uncle, a Tuskegee Airman, in Cherry Hill, New Jersey, where he applied and was accepted to Harvard University.

King earned a Bachelor of Arts in government at Harvard in 1996, was a Truman Scholar in his junior year, and received the James Madison Memorial Fellowship for secondary-level teaching of American history, American government, and social studies. While at Harvard, he was president of the Phillips Brooks House Association. King received his master's degree at Teachers College, Columbia University in the Teaching of Social Studies in 1997 and taught high school social studies.

In 1999, King co-founded Roxbury Preparatory Charter School, where he served as co-director for five years. Under King's leadership, Roxbury Prep's students attained the highest state exam scores of any urban middle school in Massachusetts, closed the racial achievement gap, and outperformed students from not only the Boston district schools but also the city's affluent suburbs. King then joined as a managing director for Uncommon Schools, an urban, public charter school organization that operates some of the highest performing urban public schools in New York, New Jersey, and Massachusetts.

In 2007, King received a Juris Doctor at Yale Law School. In 2008, King received a Doctor of Education in educational administrative practice at Teachers College, Columbia University. His dissertation was titled "Bridging the Achievement Gap: Learning from Three Charter Schools."

== Career ==
King served on the board of New Leaders for New Schools from 2005 to 2009, and is a 2008 Aspen Institute-NewSchools Entrepreneurial Leaders for Public Education Fellow.

=== New York Commissioner of Education ===
King was appointed Commissioner of Education of the State of New York in May 2011, succeeding David Steiner as Commissioner of Education and President of the University of the State of New York (USNY), after serving since October 2009 as Senior Deputy Commissioner. USNY comprised more than 7,000 public and independent elementary and secondary schools; 270 public, independent and proprietary colleges and universities; 7,000 libraries; 900 museums; 25 public broadcasting facilities; 3,000 historical repositories; 436 proprietary schools; 52 professions encompassing more than 850,000 licensees plus 240,000 certified educators; and services for children and adults with disabilities. King was the first Black and Puerto Rican to serve as New York State Education Commissioner.

As Commissioner of Education and President of USNY, Commissioner King worked with the Board of Regents to pursue an ambitious education reform agenda. New York became a national leader in implementing Common Core standards. The state's educator engagement site, called EngageNY, has had over 100 million page views by educators throughout the state and country who want to learn more about Common Core implementation and access the state's Common Core curriculum modules and videos. Through Race to the Top funding, network teams were launched in every region of the state and in every large district to provide training and embedded support to educators around implementation of the Common Core and the resources on EngageNY. In 2013, New York became one of the first states in the country to administer exams that measure whether students are meeting Common Core standards.

In partnership with Governor Cuomo, the legislature, and the statewide teachers union, Commissioner King and the New York State Education Department (NYSED) worked to develop and implement a comprehensive new teacher and leader evaluation system, which for the first time incorporated student learning growth—bringing New York State's largest school district into compliance with state law. To support this work, Commissioner King championed the creation of the Strengthening Teacher and Leader Effectiveness (STLE) grants program that funded school districts in utilizing a comprehensive approach to recruitment, development, support, retention and equitable distribution of effective teachers and school leaders. NYSED also revamped its school and district diagnostic tools and evaluations, making them more rigorous and comprehensive.

Under Commissioner King's leadership, NYSED also strengthened its approach to charter authorizing by launching a more rigorous Request for Proposals process for new schools and increasing accountability for existing schools.

In October 2013 King launched a listening tour across the state, in response to the State of New York's adoption of Common Core Standards. After a forum near Poughkeepsie, where he was drowned out by the crowd, he canceled several other planned forums, then reformatted and rescheduled them, ultimately conducting more than two dozen forums across the state. King was called on to resign by several anti-common core parent groups. In April 2014, amidst the national Common Core controversy, the state teachers' union called for his resignation.

In one of his last efforts as State Education Commissioner, King piloted a program in New York city to increase socioeconomic diversity among schools through integration.

In December 2014, King announced he was leaving the NY State Education Department to join the United States Department of Education.

=== U.S. Department of Education ===
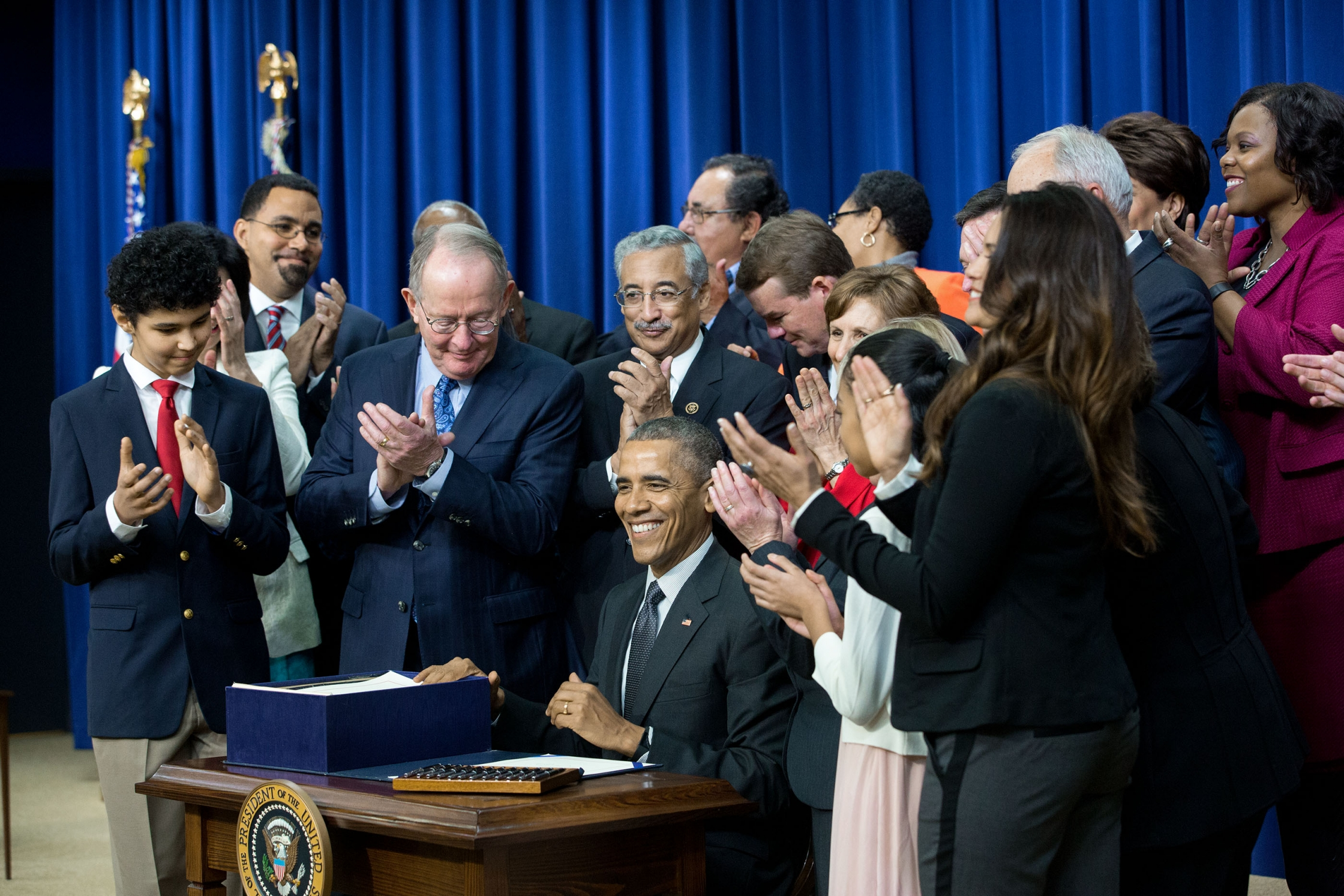
King at the signing of the 2015 Every Student Succeeds Act

King's video introduction as Secretary of Education

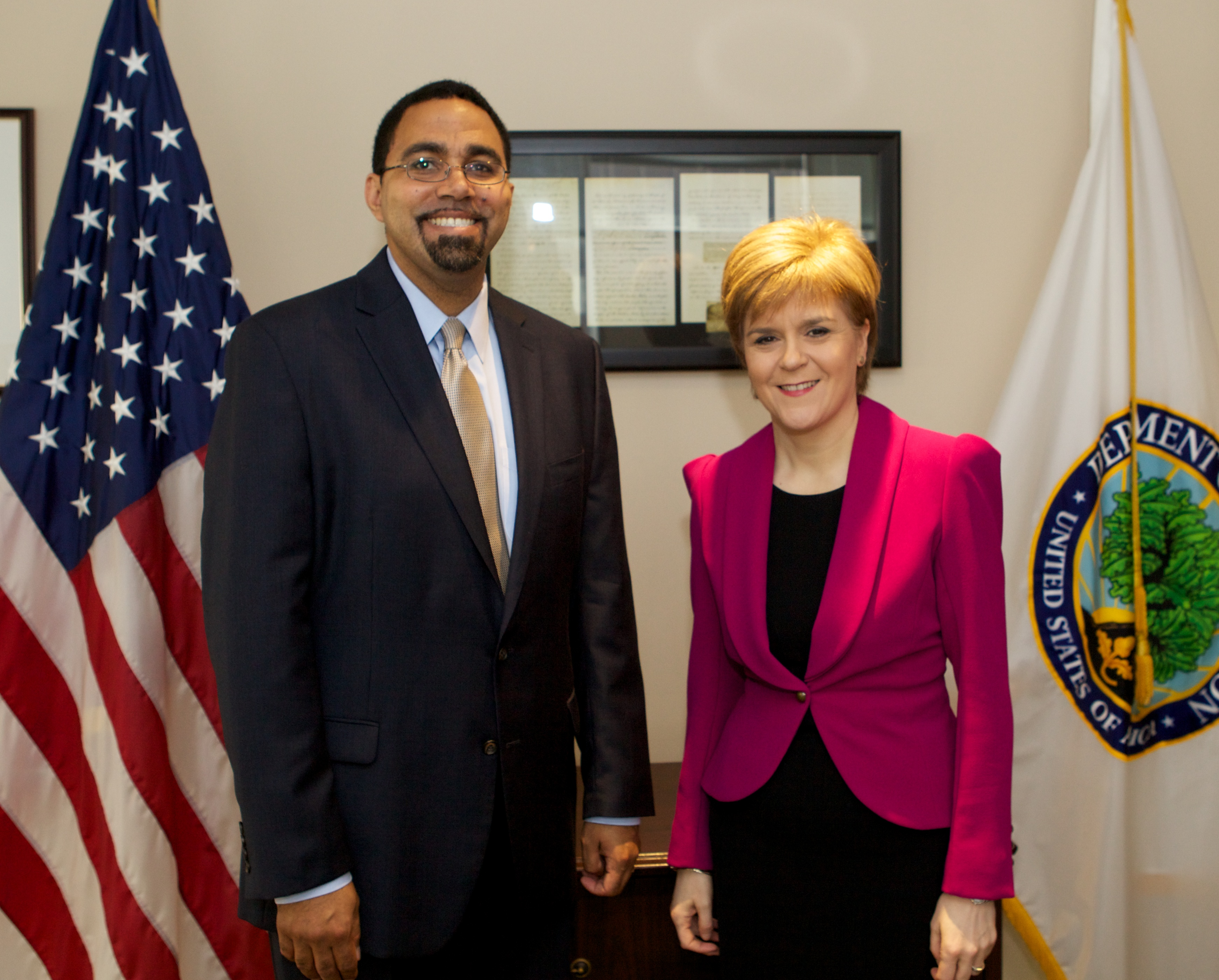
King meets First Minister of Scotland, Nicola Sturgeon, June 2015

In February 2011, King was appointed by United States Secretary of Education Arne Duncan to serve on the U.S. Department of Education's Equity and Excellence Commission.

In January 2015, King became the Acting Deputy Secretary of Education (officially, the "Senior Advisor Delegated Duties of Deputy Secretary of Education"). In this position, he oversaw all policies and programs related to P-12 education, English learners, special education, and innovation. King also oversaw the agency's operations.

In the fall of 2015 when Arne Duncan announced that he would resign as Secretary of Education at the end of the year, U.S. President Barack Obama announced that King would succeed Duncan. At the White House press briefing discussing King's appointment, President Obama called King "the right man" to lead the Department of Education, and King replied that the President and Secretary Duncan had laid out "an ambitious agenda ... and I'm proud to be able to carry it forward." In choosing King to succeed Arne Duncan, The Washington Post stated that President Obama was "choosing continuity" and noted that King was pushing for the adoption of teacher evaluations, Common Core Standards and next generation student testing as the New York State Commissioner of Schools while the Obama administration was pushing for the adoption of similar reforms across the United States. Even if their education reform agendas are similar, Duncan pointed out that King's background (he has African-American and Puerto Rican heritage, and was orphaned at age 12) gave him a "set of experiences that I think will help to make him especially impactful."

On December 10, 2015, President Obama signed the Every Student Succeeds Act, the successor law to the No Child Left Behind Act. In remarks at the signing ceremony, the President said, "we are going to miss Arne Duncan a lot. Fortunately ... we also have a great replacement for Arne in Dr. John King, who is going to be doing outstanding work helping to implement this [new legislation]."

On January 1, 2016, King became Acting Secretary. On March 14, 2016, King was approved to be Secretary of Education by the United States Senate after a 49–40 vote. King was the second African-American, the second Latino and first Afro-Latino to serve as U.S. Secretary of Education. In September 2016, King travelled to six states to discuss education—visiting 11 cities and towns—for the Obama administration's final Back to School Bus tour.

King worked to advance the implementation of the Every Student Succeeds Act (ESSA), saying that it provides for a "well-rounded education" and that he is "among those who worry that the balance has shifted too much away from subjects outside of math and English that could be the spark to a child's interest and excitement, and are actually essential to success in reading, and are critical to a child's future."

In November 2016, the U.S. Department of Education released the final ESSA accountability rules, boosting state flexibility in key areas. "The final rules give states more time and flexibility to provide every student with a high-quality, well-rounded education while ensuring that states and districts keep the focus on improving outcomes and maintaining civil rights protections for all children, particularly those who need our support the most," King said in a statement.

King continued his efforts towards socioeconomic and racial integration by centering federal education policy on increasing student diversity and in December 2016 he announced a $12 million grant competition "that would give up to 20 school districts the opportunity to craft new roadmaps for increasing student diversity and get started on those plans. Districts could use the money to get ideas from their communities on the best ways to bolster school integration, do a data analysis of where they currently stand on integration, and more."

King has addressed school discipline directly—especially as it disproportionally affects students of color and students with disabilities—calling on states that continue to allow corporal punishment on students to cease and implement disciplinary measures that support students and reducing exclusionary disciplinary practices. King has played an integral role in coordinating inter-agency work on My Brother's Keeper including allowing as many as 12,000 prison inmates to apply for federal Pell grants to finance college classes, despite a 22-year congressional ban on providing financial aid to prisoners.

Preparing teachers to lead has been a top priority for King, allowing states to use Title II funds to aid in the development and preparation of teachers. For example, states can use Title II funds to:

- Offer extra pay to teachers who teach in high needs subjects, or teach special populations, such as English-language learners.
- Address working conditions in high-needs schools, or give teachers who work in them extra time to plan and collaborate.
- Use federal teacher quality funds to support preparation programs at traditional universities, but also for alternative-preparation programs, and teacher residency programs.
- Train principals, including giving them time to learn from each other.

King has also worked to increase and support teachers of color.

In addition to improving Pre-K-12 outcomes, King focused on college completion, noting that "far too many students start college but do not finish, with students of color and first-generation and low-income students dropping out at higher rates than their white or better-off peer." King introduced a number of initiatives and tools to increase college completion, crack down on predatory for-profit colleges, and minimize student debt.

=== The Education Trust ===
On February 2, 2017, The Education Trust announced that King would take on the role of President and CEO. He succeeds Kati Haycock, who founded the organization in the early 1990s. Education Trust is "a national nonprofit that works to close opportunity gaps that disproportionately affect students of color and students from low-income families." Publications of the Education Trust focus on recruiting and retaining more teachers of color, centering racial equity in socio-emotional learning, eliminating bias in the discipline of girls of color, inequitable access to advanced coursework, disparities in access to quality early childhood education, and dismantling continuing racial disparities in access to public higher education. In addition, King serves as co-chair of the Aspen Institute K12 Climate Action Commission with former Bush administration EPA Administrator and NJ Governor Christine Todd Whitman.

=== Strong Future Maryland ===
In October 2020, King founded a new advocacy organization called Strong Future Maryland. The mission of Strong Future Maryland is to "work to advance bold, progressive policy changes to address systemic inequality and promote a sustainable, just and prosperous economic future for all Marylanders." The organization's areas of policy focus include investing in public education, strengthening the social safety net, broad-based economic development benefiting historically marginalized communities, and climate change and environmental justice.

King serves as a professor of the Practice at the University of Maryland College Park where he began teaching as a visiting professor in 2017.

=== 2022 Maryland gubernatorial candidacy ===
On April 20, 2021, King announced that he would be seeking the Democratic nomination for Governor of Maryland in the 2022 election cycle. In January 2022, he announced Michelle Siri, the executive director of the Women's Law Center of Maryland, as his running mate for Lieutenant Governor. His platform included funding and implementing the Blueprint for Maryland's Future, achieving net-zero carbon emissions by 2035, and accelerating the state's transition to a minimum wage of $15 an hour. If elected, he would have become Maryland's first Black governor.

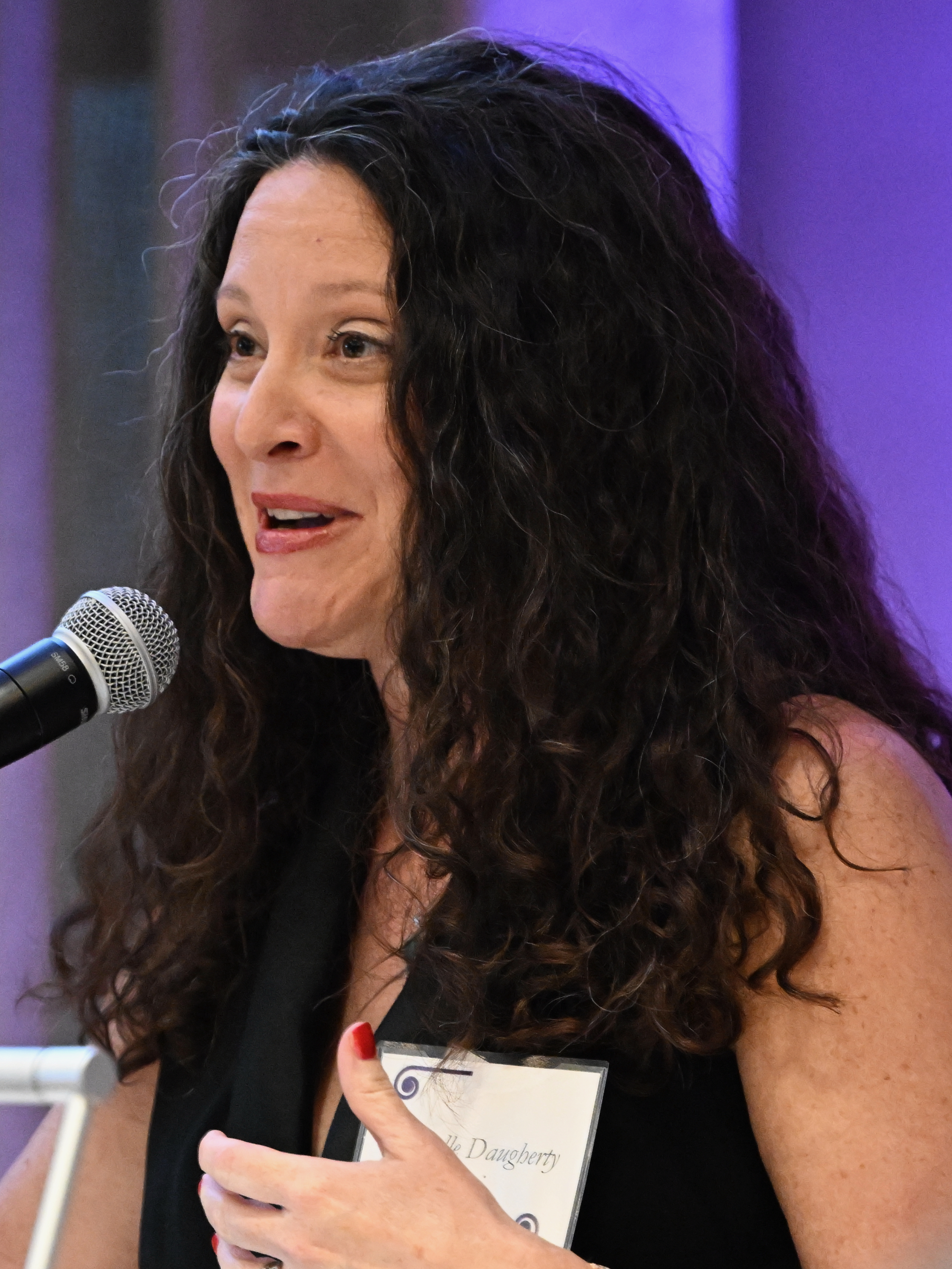
King named Michelle Siri (pictured in 2024) as his running mate.

During the primary, King received endorsements from Pro-Choice Maryland, the Maryland Sierra Club, and the Maryland Sunrise Movement.

On April 6, 2022, gubernatorial candidate Wes Moore filed a complaint with the Maryland State Board of Elections against King's campaign, accusing "an unidentified party" of anonymously disseminating "false and disparaging information regarding Wes Moore via electronic mail and social media in an orchestrated attempt to disparage Mr. Moore and damage his candidacy." The complaint also suggested that King "may be responsible for this smear campaign", which the King campaign denied. In April 2024, King's campaign was fined $2,000 after prosecutors connected the email address to an IP address used by Joseph O'Hearn, King's campaign manager.

On July 19, 2022, King lost the primary, placing sixth behind Doug Gansler, Peter Franchot, Tom Perez, and Wes Moore. King conceded defeat that night.

Maryland gubernatorial Democratic primary, 2022
Party	Candidate	Votes	%
Democratic	Wes Moore; Aruna Miller	217,524	32.4
Democratic	Tom Perez; Shannon Sneed	202,175	30.1
Democratic	Peter Franchot; Monique Anderson-Walker	141,586	21.1
Democratic	Rushern Baker (withdrawn); Nancy Navarro (withdrawn)	26,594	4.0
Democratic	Doug Gansler; Candace Hollingsworth	25,481	3.8
Democratic	John King Jr.; Michelle Siri	24,882	3.7
Democratic	Ashwani Jain; LaTrece Hawkins Lytes	13,784	2.1
Democratic	Jon Baron; Natalie Williams	11,880	1.8
Democratic	Jerome Segal; Justinian M. Dispenza	4,276	0.6
Democratic	Ralph Jaffe; Mark Greben	2,978	0.4

== Personal life ==
King is married to Melissa Steel King, a partner at Bellwether who began her career as a kindergarten and 1st grade teacher. They have lived in Silver Spring, Maryland and have two daughters.

King serves on several boards including the Harvard Board of Overseers, the Robin Hood Foundation, MDRC, and the American Museum of Natural History. King co-chairs This Is Planet Ed with former New Jersey Governor and EPA Administrator Christine Todd Whitman, an initiative of the Energy and Environment Program of the Aspen Institute which seeks to mobilize the education sector to act on climate. King previously served on the boards of Marylanders to Prevent Gun Violence and Teach Plus.

King has family roots in Maryland. His great-grandfather was enslaved in Gaithersburg, Maryland, and the cabin in which he, his mother, and siblings lived as enslaved people is still standing. King's grandmother was among the earliest graduates of the University of Maryland Eastern Shore in 1894, a historically Black college which was then known as Princess Anne Academy.

== See also ==
- List of African-American United States Cabinet members
- List of United States politicians with doctorates

Government offices
Preceded by David Steiner	Education Commissioner of New York; 2011–2015	Succeeded by MaryEllen Elia
Political offices
Preceded by Jim Shelton	United States Deputy Secretary of Education; Acting; 2015–2016	Succeeded by James Cole Jr. Acting
Preceded by Arne Duncan	United States Secretary of Education; 2016–2017	Succeeded by Betsy DeVos
U.S. order of precedence (ceremonial)
Preceded by Loretta Lynch as Former U.S. Cabinet Member	Order of precedence of the United States as Former U.S. Cabinet Member	Succeeded by Jim Mattis as Former U.S. Cabinet Member
