= David Steiner (academic) =

American academic administrator and professor

- Born: 1958 (age 67–68); Princeton, New Jersey
- Occupation: Academic
- Known for: Executive director of the Johns Hopkins Institute for Education Policy
- Parent(s): George Steiner, Zara Shakow

Academic background
- Education: The Perse School
- Alma mater: Balliol College, Oxford

Academic work
- Discipline: Education
- Notable works: Rethinking Democratic Education: The Politics of Reform

David Milton Steiner (born 1958) is executive director of the Johns Hopkins Institute for Education Policy and professor of education at Johns Hopkins University. His previous appointments include New York State Commissioner of Education in the New York State Education Department; director of arts education at the National Endowment for the Arts; founding director of the City University of New York Institute for Education Policy at Roosevelt House and the Klara and Larry Silverstein Dean at the Hunter College School of Education; and member of the Maryland State Board of Education and Maryland Commission for Innovation and Excellence in Education. Steiner currently serves on the boards of the Core Knowledge Foundation and Relay Graduate School of Education. Most recently, he was appointed to the Practitioner Council at the Hoover Institute, Stanford University.

== Biography ==
He was born in Princeton, New Jersey, to American-born British historian Zara Shakow and academic George Steiner, a French-born American Holocaust survivor of Austrian-Jewish descent who emigrated to New York to escape Nazism. David Steiner was raised in Cambridge, England where he attended The Perse School. He later earned degrees from Balliol College, Oxford University (B.A. and M.A.) and Harvard University (Ph.D.).

From 1999 to 2004 he was a professor of education in Boston University's School of Education in its department of administration. He then served as the director of arts education at the National Endowment for the Arts (NEA) from 2004–2005 where among his accomplishments he designed and inaugurated the first national program to fund intensive teacher preparation to present major, complex works of art in classrooms. He strengthened assessment and accountability systems to evaluate learning outcomes in the NEA’s arts grants programs. Finally, he worked with Jazz at Lincoln Center to codevelop the endowment’s first on-line jazz curriculum. He left his position at the NEA in 2005 to serve as the Klara and Larry Silverstein Dean at the Hunter College-CUNY's School of Education.

In 2009, the New York State Board of Regents, led by Chancellor Merryl Tisch, chose Steiner to replace out-going Commissioner Richard Paul Mills, who had served as commissioner of education since 1995. Steiner's accomplishments in his tenure as commissioner were broad. They include advancing the New York State Regents Reform Agenda by leading the successful $700M NYS application for the Federal Race to the Top Award and other competitively sourced funds. He was integral in the reformation of teacher and principal standards, which included a redesign of teacher certification requirements incorporating performance-based assessments for all teacher candidates. Commissioner Steiner also raised standards on New York State public school assessments.

In 2010 he approved a controversial waiver of job requirement standards for publisher Cathie Black, for chancellor of the New York City Department of Education. Under an agreement made with Mayor Bloomberg, the waiver for Cathie Black was granted along with the creation of a new position of Chief Academic Officer at the New York City Department of Education which was filled by Shael Polakow-Suransky

In 2011, Steiner returned to Hunter College as dean of the School of Education and founding director of the CUNY Institute for Education Policy. Under his leadership, the Hunter College School of Education became the only education school in the nation to have three programs rated as three-stars or above in the inaugural 2013 US News/NCTQ evaluation of teacher preparation programs. In 2014, Hunter College School of Education was awarded the Christa McAuliffe Excellence in Teacher Education Award by the American Association of State Colleges and Universities.

In 2015, Steiner joined Johns Hopkins University to serve as professor of education and executive director of the newly created Institute for Education Policy (Institute).

At the Institute, Steiner has advised commissioners of education in Louisiana, Massachusetts, Tennessee, Rhode Island, Mississippi, New Mexico, Nebraska, Wyoming, and Maryland and senior state education staff in Delaware and Ohio. Steiner’s policy advice has resulted in major shifts at both the state and district levels. The Institute has been nationally recognized for its impact on curricula change and for its work in Providence, Rhode Island.

For the state of Louisiana, Steiner serves as a senior advisor in partnership with NWEA and the state education department to design a new English language arts assessment for the state, under the Federal Pilot Assessment Authority (IADA), granted by the ESSA legislation.

Other Institute partners include: America Achieves, the Bill and Melinda Gates Foundation, Chiefs for Change, the Schusterman Foundation the Alliance for Excellent Education, the Council of Chief State School Officers, and the Walton Family Foundation. Steiner has served as the principal investigator and/or author on research projects with each of these partners.

Steiner’s research primarily focuses on the areas of teacher preparation, curriculum, and assessment. During the COVID crisis, Steiner has argued for acceleration learning strategies instead of remediation in webinars with UNESCO and The World Bank. His work on acceleration has been cited in The Washington Post, the Financial Times, and The Economist.

== Selected bibliography ==
- Steiner, David. "Education Reform: Not Complicated -- but Seriously Difficult." The Huffington Post. N.p., n.d. Web. 9 Mar. 2015.
- Steiner, David. "The Politics of Liberal Education." Journal of Higher Education. 64.6 (1993): 730+. Academic OneFile. Web. 9 Mar. 2015.
- Steiner, David. Rethinking Democratic Education: The Politics of Reform Baltimore: Johns Hopkins University Press, 1994. Print.
- Steiner, David. "Trusting Our Judgment: Measurement and Accountability for Educational Outcomes." Teachers College Record 115.9 (September 2013): 1-8. Print.
- Steiner, David. "Urban Hero." Education Next. 7.4 (Fall 2007). Web. 9 Mar. 2015.
- Steiner, David. "Curriculum Research: What We Know and Where We Need to Go," for StandardsWork, Web. Apr. 2017.
- Steiner, David with Magee, J., Jensen, B., Button, J. "Curriculum Literacy in Schools of Education?" for Learning First, Web. Nov. 2018.
- Steiner, David with Weisberg, D. "When Students Go Back to School, Too Many Will Start the Year Behind. Here's How to Catch Them Up - in Real Time." in The 74, April 26, 2020.
- Steiner, David. "Don't Remediate, Accelerate! Effective Catch-Up Learning Strategies: Evidence From the United States," for UNESCO. Web. August 2020.
- Steiner, David. A Nation at Thought New York: Rowman & Littlefield Publishers, 2023. Print.

== Notes ==
Government offices
Preceded by Richard P. Mills	New York State Commissioner of Education; 2009 – 2011	Succeeded by John King, Jr.
Preceded by Richard P. Mills	President of the University of the State of New York; 2009 – 2011	Succeeded by John King, Jr.
