= Richard P. Mills (educator) =

American educator

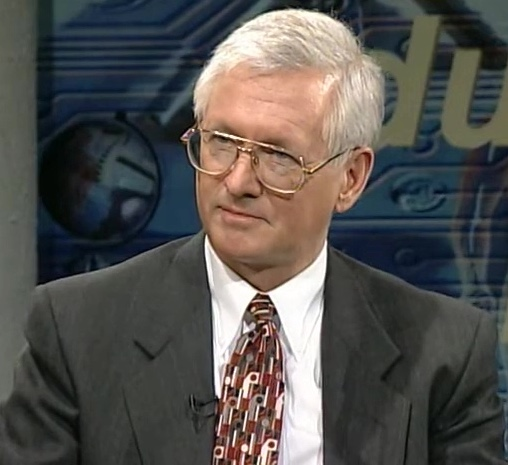
- Mills on CUNY TV's Education Forum, 1999]

12th Commissioner of Education of the State of New York
- In office 1995–2009
- Preceded by: Thomas Sobol
- Succeeded by: David M. Steiner

Personal details
- Born: November 28, 1944 Paris, Illinois, U.S.
- Died: November 1, 2017 (aged 72) Adirondack Mountains
- Profession: Educator

Richard Paul Mills (November 28, 1944 – November 1, 2017) was an American educator who served as the Vermont State Commissioner of Education and Commissioner of Education of the State of New York.

== Early life and career ==
Mills was born in Paris, Illinois to a former teacher and college professor turned insurance salesman.

He earned a bachelor's degree in history at Middlebury College in 1966 and a master's degree in American history at Columbia University in 1967. He began his career as a history teacher at the Dalton School in Manhattan, New York City and helped found the Elizabeth Seeger School in 1971. He pursued an MBA at Columbia Business School, graduating in 1975, and an Ed.D. at Teachers College, Columbia University in 1977.

He moved to work for the New Jersey Department of Education in the mid-1970s, where he held various administrative posts. Governor Thomas Kean picked him to serve as special assistant on education in 1984. In 1988, Governor Madeleine M. Kunin selected him to serve as Commissioner of Education for Vermont.

== Years as New York Commissioner of Education ==
In 1995, the board of regents appointed him Commissioner of Education for New York State.

=== Initiatives and State results ===
Including his calls for high standards. Since 1995 Mills has taken many unprecedented steps including the end of local school boards of education autonomy to grant diplomas through the new mandatory Regents Diploma

His calls for increased education spending, doubling the amount spend on schools in NY since 1995 with NY now ranked second nationally in educational spending, with the latest spending not accounted for it is expected NY will now be first in per pupil spending.

Despite this spending NY's graduation rate is 58%, according to the Bill and Melinda Gates Foundation the third worst in the nation behind only South Carolina at 54%, and Georgia at 56%. Neighboring Pennsylvania garners 81%.

=== Roosevelt School takeover ===
Most troubling is that for the first time the commissioner removed an elected school board for overspending $1.9 million. and having low test scores.

In the aftermath of that takeover in 2002 Mills appointed the new superintendent and board of education yet the academic numbers have steadily worsened along with enrollment. Yet in 2007 a state audit now found the school had overspent $12 million.

After the state brought in report cards six months late, the state refuses to publish the data for Roosevelt Schools. It is the only time the state has refused to publish a report card, even though the district is under direct state control.

=== Contacts with public education ===
Mills has also drawn calls of hypocrisy: despite his leadership of the NY State Education Department, Mills has never taught in a public school, never been a principal or superintendent in a public school, nor even attended a public school. His only teaching experience comes from the exclusive, private Dalton School.

Under Mills' tenure, a series of scandals happened with multiple school districts on Long Island, including contractor lawyers who were being listed as full-time employees by multiple school districts and claiming lucrative public pensions and benefits. He was also criticized for the rampant "double dipping" practice by school district officials, especially on Long Island. At the top of the list was James Hunderfund, interim superintendent of Malverne, who was entitled to an annual payment of $516,245 in 2008. Each year, Mills' department granted one third of all of the waivers of New York states to "double dippers", people who collects full public pensions and earn more than $30,000 a year. Many times, top level of school district officials are rehired as top level school district officials, even before they are officially retired.

=== Retirement and death ===
In May 2007, Mills announced that he had prostate cancer. On October 31, 2008, Mills announced he would leave his post in June 2009.

He died on November 1, 2017, of a heart attack suffered while hiking in the Adirondack Mountains.

Government offices
Preceded by Stephen S. Kaagan	Vermont State Commissioner of Education; 1988–1995	Succeeded by Douglas Walker (Acting)
Preceded by Thomas Sobol	New York State Commissioner of Education; 1995–2009	Succeeded by David M. Steiner
Preceded by Thomas Sobol	President of the University of the State of New York; 1995–2009	Succeeded by David M. Steiner
