= Commissioner of Education of New York =

The commissioner of education of New York is the head of the State Education Department, chosen by the Board of Regents of the University of the State of New York. The commissioner also serves as the president of the University of the State of New York office. Generally, the regents set policy while the commissioner has responsibility for carrying out policy.

== List of commissioners ==
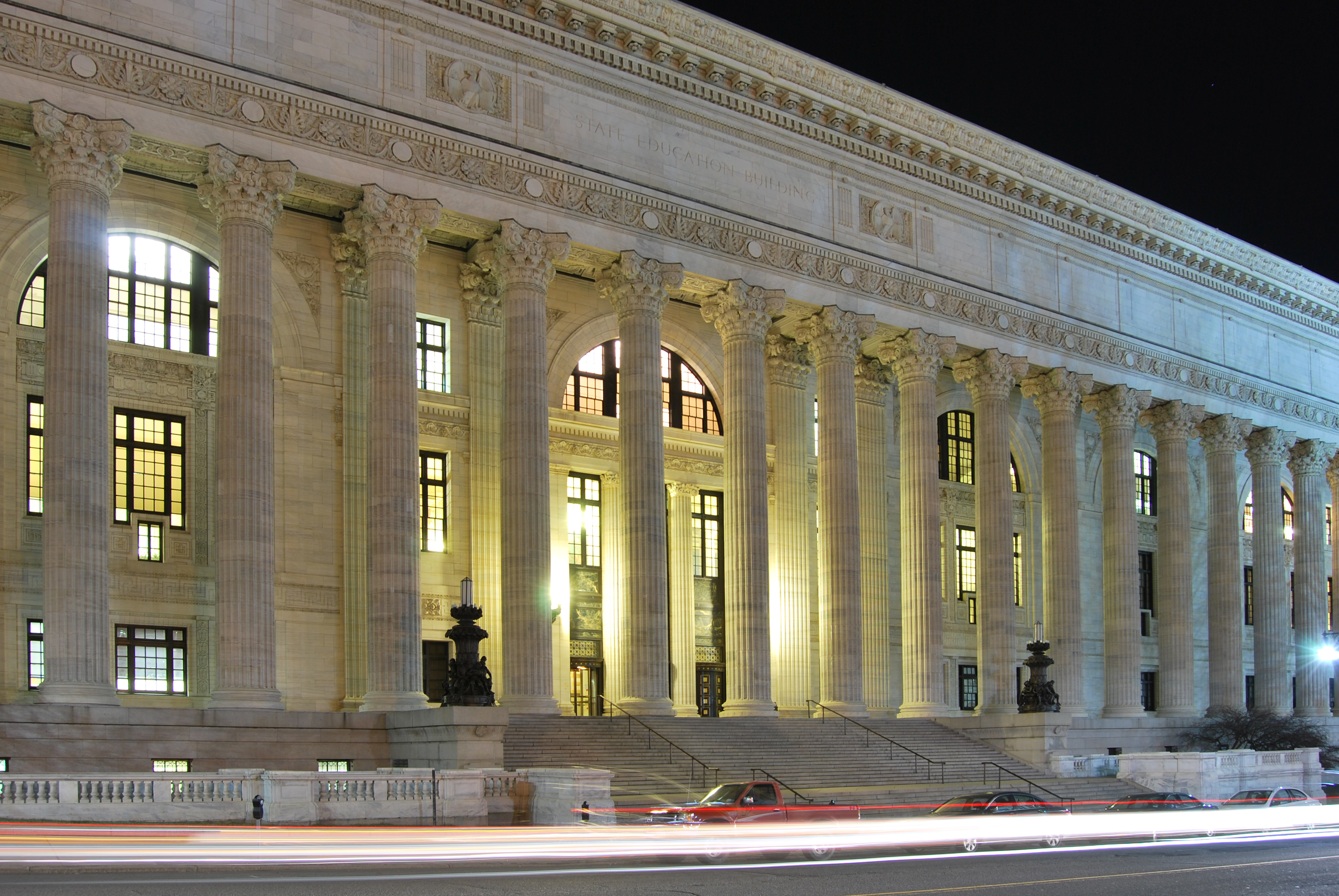
The State Education Building, located in Albany

| Andrew Sloan Draper | 1904–1913 |
| John Huston Finley | 1913–1921 |
| Frank Pierrepont Graves | 1921–1940 |
| Ernest E. Cole | 1940–1942 |
| George D. Stoddard | 1942–1945 |
| Francis T. Spaulding | 1946–1950 |
| Lewis A. Wilson | 1950–1955 |
| James Edward Allen, Jr. | 1955–1969 |
| Ewald Nyquist | 1969–1976 |
| Gordon M. Ambach | 1976–1986 |
| Thomas Sobol | 1987–1995 |
| Richard Paul Mills | 1995–2009 |
| David Miller Steiner | 2009–2011 |
| John King Jr. | 2011–2014 |
| MaryEllen Elia | 2015–2019 |
| Shannon L. Tahoe | 2019–2020 |
| Betty A. Rosa | 2020–present |
