= James Monroe High School (New York City) =

Former public school in New York City

Information
- Established: 1924
- Closed: 1997

James Monroe High School was a comprehensive high school located at 1300 Boynton Avenue at East 172nd Street in the Soundview section of the Bronx, New York City.

Opened in 1924, the original school ran for seventy years before being shut down in 1997 for poor performance. The original building now houses seven smaller high schools: the Monroe Academy for Visual Arts and Design (H.S. 692), the Monroe Academy for Business and Law (H.S. 690), the High School of World Cultures (H.S. 550), The Metropolitan Soundview Highschool (X521), Pan American International High School (X388), Mott Hall V (X242) and the newly opened Cinema School (first opened its doors for the 2009–2010 school year). The building also used to house an elementary school, The Bronx Little School.

The building was designed by William H. Gompert, who was the New York City Superintendent of School Buildings. The building was built by the T.A. Clarke Co., and is substantially identical to a handful of other high school buildings that were built in the city at the same time.

The words "Where Law Ends, Tyranny Begins," — which are chiseled into the face of the concrete columned triangular portico that adorns the main entrance to the original building at 1300 Boynton Avenue & East 172nd Street— are followed by the attributed source as being William Pitt the Elder (1708–1778), War Minister for the French & Indian War and later Prime Minister of Great Britain.

Though these words were not originally spoken by Pitt, his actual words are also misquoted. As excerpted from his 1770 original speech, he said, "Unlimited power is apt to corrupt the minds of those who possess it; and this I know, my lords, that where laws end, tyranny begins,".

Despite these words being attributed to William Pitt, they were in fact written by John Locke in his "Two Treatises of Civil Government", published in 1689. Pitt's actual later quote, attributed from a speech he delivered 81 years later, is alternately paraphrased as "Where law ends, there tyranny begins".

== Notable alumni ==
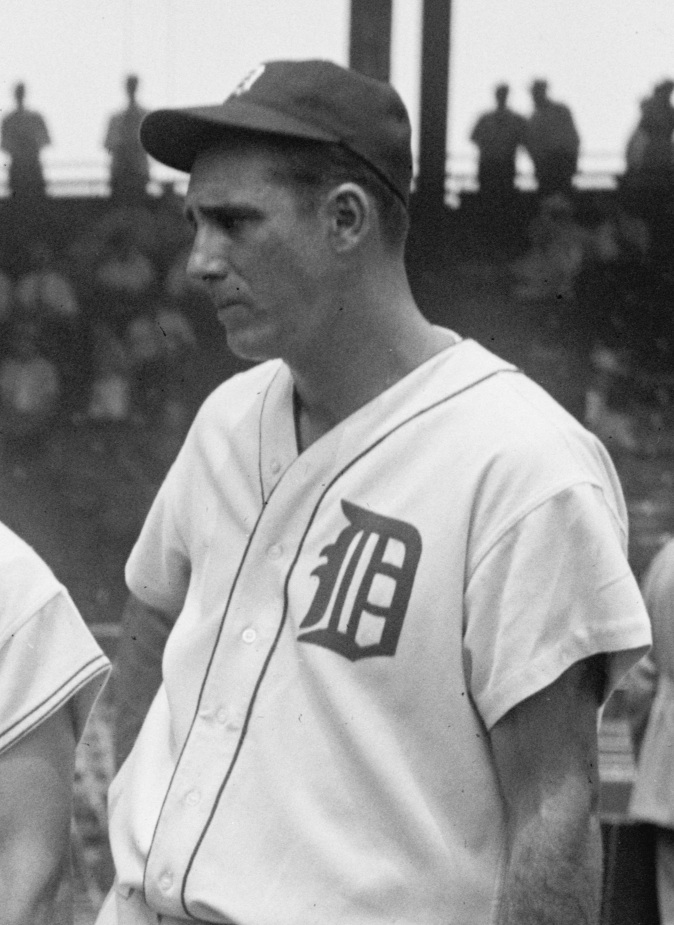
Hall of Famer Hank Greenberg

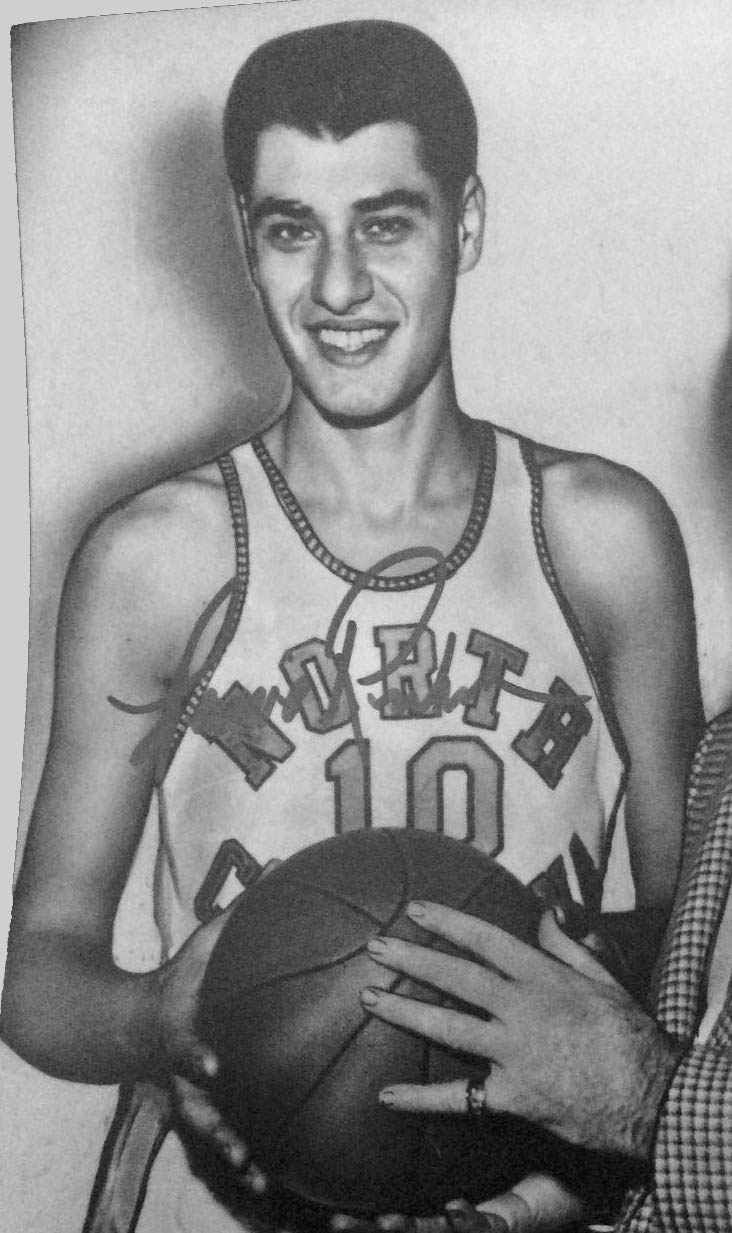
Lennie Rosenbluth

- Danny Aiello, actor, who attended Monroe for two weeks before dropping out to enlist in National Guard
- Danny Almonte, baseball player who participated in the 2001 Little League World Series despite being too old to do so
- Saul Bass, graphic designer, movie title sequence designer, and filmmaker
- Edward J. Bloustein (1925–1989), 17th president of Rutgers University
- Paul Bogart (1919–2012), television director and producer
- Milton Cardona ('63), musician who recorded with Willie Colon, Hector Lavoe and Tito Puente
- Darren Carrington ('84), 8-year NFL player (Broncos, Lions, Chargers, Panthers), played in two Super Bowls
- Cornelius H. Charlton, U.S. Army soldier and Medal of Honor recipient in Korean War
- Judy Craig, Patricia Bennett, and Barbara Lee of singing group the Chiffons
- Larry Eisenberg, biomedical engineer, science fiction writer and limericist
- Jules Feiffer (‘47), cartoonist for Village Voice (won Pulitzer Prize in editorial cartooning); author, playwright and screenwriter
- Paul A. Fino, GOP Congressman and State Senator, representing the Bronx
- Art Fleming ('41), original host of TV's Jeopardy! and former Monroe football star
- Stan Getz, jazz saxophonist
- Nathan Glazer, sociologist who co-authored Beyond the Melting Pot
- Izzy Goldstein, Major League Baseball player
- Hank Greenberg ('29), Major League Baseball player with Detroit Tigers, 2-time American League MVP and Hall of Famer; led Monroe to PSAL basketball championship in 1927 and PSAL baseball title in 1929, three-sport All-City selection in soccer, basketball and baseball
- Lenny Hambro, jazz musician (woodwinds), notably with bands of Gene Krupa, Glenn Miller, Machito, and Chico O'Farrill
- Jonathan Harris ('31), actor
- Robert Johnson, first Black American to serve as the Bronx County District Attorney (January 1, 1989) in history of New York State; in 2005, he became longest-serving District Attorney in Bronx County history; Monroe graduate and U.S. Navy veteran
- Herbert E. Klarman ('35), American public health economist
- Martin J. Klein ('39), historian of modern physics and senior editor of The Collected Papers of Albert Einstein (Princeton University Press) from 1988 to 1998; first winner (2005) of Abraham Pais Prize, first major award for history of physics
- Karen Koslowitz, New York City Council member representing Queens
- Ed Kranepool ('62), Major League Baseball player, signed by the New York Mets just days after his 1962 graduation from Monroe, one of 1962 Mets and member of 1969 World Series champions
- Leon M. Lederman ('39), Nobel Laureate in Physics in 1988
- Samuel Lubell, public opinion pollster, journalist, and National Book Award for Nonfiction finalist (1957)
- Juliet Man Ray, dancer and model, wife and muse of artist Man Ray
- Robert Marshak (1916–1992), physicist, educator and eighth president of the City College of New York
- Judith Merril, science-fiction author and editor
- Stanley Milgram (1933–1984, class of 1950), social psychologist
- Dan Monzon ('64), baseball infielder, manager and scout
- Malloy Nesmith Sr. ('88), streetball player
- Estelle Reiner ('32), actor and singer
- Regina Resnik (1922–2013), opera singer and actor
- Ellie Rodríguez ('64), former Major League Baseball player
- Lennie Rosenbluth ('52), college and NBA basketball player
- Mickey Rutner, Major League Baseball player
- Ron Sanchez, college basketball coach
- Nancy Savoca, Sundance Film Festival Grand Jury Award-winning filmmaker
- Paul R. Screvane, politician
- Art Shay ('39), photographer and writer
- Leonard P. Stavisky (1925–1999), university professor and politician
- Robert Strauss, actor, Academy Award-nominated for role in Stalag 17
- Anthony Velonis, WPA artist who helped introduce silkscreen printing to mainstream as fine art form
- Cora Walker, one of first black women to practice law in New York
- Doris Wishman, filmmaker
- Wilbur Young ('67), former defensive lineman in National Football League
- Philip Zimbardo (born 1933), social psychologist known for his 1971 Stanford prison experiment

== Notable staff ==
- Anthony J. Alvarado (1942–2024), educator
- Rose Freistater (born 1908), schoolteacher notable for being denied a teacher's license for being overweight
- Alexander Taffel, physics teacher and principal
