= List of United States politicians with doctorates =

This is a list of notable United States politicians who have a research doctorate.

== Federal government ==
=== Executive branch ===
==== Presidents ====
| Name | Party | Term | Field | Institution | Year |
|---|---|---|---|---|---|
| Woodrow Wilson | Democrat | 1913–1921 | Political Science | Johns Hopkins University | 1886 |

==== Current and former cabinet members and senior administration officials ====
| Name | Party | Department | Term | Administration | Field | Institution | Year |
|---|---|---|---|---|---|---|---|
| Walt Rostow | Democrat | NSC | 1966-1969 | L. Johnson | Economics | Yale University | 1940 |
| George Shultz | Republican | Labor/OMB/Treasury/State | 1969–1970, 1970–1972, 1972–1974, 1982–1989 | Nixon/Reagan | Economics | Massachusetts Institute of Technology | 1949 |
| Henry Kissinger | Republican | NSC/State | 1969–1975, 1973–1977 | Nixon/Ford | Political Science | Harvard University | 1954 |
| James R. Schlesinger | Republican | CIA/Defense/Energy | 1973, 1973–1975, 1977–1979 | Nixon/Ford/Carter | Economics | Harvard University | 1956 |
| Edward H. Levi | Republican | Justice | 1975–1977 | Ford | Law (JSD) | Yale Law School | 1938 |
| Brent Scowcroft | Republican | NSC | 1975–1977, 1989-1993 | Ford/Bush Sr. | International Relations | Columbia University | 1967 |
| W. Michael Blumenthal | Democrat | Treasury | 1977–1979 | Carter | Economics | Princeton University | 1956 |
| Zbigniew Brzezinski | Democratic | NSC | 1977–1981 | Carter | Political Science | Harvard University | 1953 |
| Harold Brown | Independent | Defense | 1977–1981 | Carter | Physics | Columbia University | 1949 |
| Ray Marshall | Democratic | Labor | 1977–1981 | Carter | Economics | University of California, Berkeley | 1954 |
| William J. Crowe | Republican | Chairman of the Joint Chiefs of Staff; Ambassador to the United Kingdom | 1985–1989; 1994–1997 | Reagan/Bush Sr./Clinton | Political Science | Princeton University | ? |
| Max Kampelman | Democrat | Counselor of the United States Department of State | 1987–1989 | Reagan | Political science | University of Minnesota | 1952 |
| Alan Greenspan | Republican | Chair of the Federal Reserve | 1987–2006 | Reagan/Bush Sr./Clinton/Bush Jr. | Economics | New York University | 1977 |
| Lauro Cavazos | Republican | United States Secretary of Education | 1988–1990 | Bush Sr. | Physiology | Iowa State University | 1954 |
| Robert Gates | Republican | Central Intelligence Agency/Defense | 1991–1993, 2006–2011 | Bush Sr./Bush Jr./Obama | Russian and Soviet History | Georgetown University | 1974 |
| Les Aspin | Democrat | Defense | 1993–1994 | Clinton | Economics | MIT | 1966 |
| Donna Shalala | Democrat | United States Secretary of Health and Human Services | 1993–2001 | Clinton | Political Science | Syracuse University | 1970 |
| William Perry | Independent | Defense | 1994–1997 | Clinton | Mathematics | Pennsylvania State University | 1957 |
| John Hamre | Republican | United States Deputy Secretary of Defense, Comptroller of the Department of Defense | 1994–1997, 1997–2000 | Clinton | International Studies | Johns Hopkins University | 1978 |
| John M. Deutch | Democrat | CIA | 1995–1996 | Clinton | Chemistry | Massachusetts Institute of Technology | 1966 |
| Madeleine Albright | Democrat | State | 1997–2001 | Clinton | Political Science | Columbia University | 1975 |
| Lawrence Summers | Democrat | Treasury | 1999–2001 | Clinton | Economics | Harvard University | 1982 |
| Condoleezza Rice | Republican | State | 2005–2009 | Bush Jr. | Political Science | University of Denver | 1981 |
| Sam Bodman | Republican | Energy | 2005–2009 | Bush Jr. | Chemical Engineering | Massachusetts Institute of Technology | 1965 |
| Ben Bernanke | Republican | Chair of the Federal Reserve | 2006–2014 | Bush Jr./Obama | Economics | Massachusetts Institute of Technology | 1979 |
| Steven Chu | Democrat | Energy | 2009–2013 | Obama | Physics | University of California, Berkeley | 1976 |
| David Petraeus | Independent | CIA | 2011–2012 | Obama | International Relations | Princeton University | 1987 |
| Ernest Moniz | Democrat | Energy | 2013–2017 | Obama | Theoretical Physics | Stanford University | 1972 |
| Susan Rice | Democrat | NSC | 2013–2017 | Obama | International Relations | University of Oxford | 1990 |
| Janet Yellen | Democrat | Chair of the Federal Reserve/Treausry | 2014-2018, 2021–2025 | Obama/Trump/Biden | Economics | Yale University | 1971 |
| Ash Carter | Democrat | Defense | 2015–2017 | Obama | Theoretical Physics | St. John's College, Oxford | 1979 |
| John King | Democrat | Education | 2016–2017 | Obama | Education | Columbia University | 2008 |
| H. R. McMaster | Independent | NSC | 2017–2018 | Trump | History | University of North Carolina, Chapel Hill | 1997 |
| Mark Esper | Republican | Defense | 2019–2020 | Trump | Public policy | George Washington University | 2008 |
| Miguel Cardona | Democrat | Education | 2021–2025 | Biden | Education | University of Connecticut | 2011 |
| Eric Lander | Democrat | Education | 2021–2025 | Biden | Mathematics | Wolfson College, Oxford | 1980 |

=== Supreme Court Justices ===
| Name | Term | Field | Institution | Year |
|---|---|---|---|---|
| Neil Gorsuch | 2017– | Legal Philosophy | University College, Oxford | 2004 |

=== Legislative branch ===
==== Current senators ====
| Name | Party | State | Term | Field | Institution | Year |
|---|---|---|---|---|---|---|
| Tammy Duckworth | Democrat | Illinois | 2017– | Human Services | Capella University | 2014 |
| Raphael Warnock | Democrat | Georgia | 2021– | Theology | Union Theological Seminary | 2006 |
| Andy Kim | Democrat | NJ-03 | 2024– | International Relations | Oxford University | 2010 |
| Dave McCormick | Republican | Pennsylvania | 2025– | International Relations | Princeton University | 1996 |

==== Former senators ====
| Name | Party | State | Term | Field | Institution | Year |
|---|---|---|---|---|---|---|
| Henry Cabot Lodge | Republican | Massachusetts | 1893–1924 | History | Harvard University | 1876 |
| Paul Douglas | Democratic | Illinois | 1949–1967 | Economics | Columbia University | 1921 |
| George McGovern | Democratic | South Dakota | 1963–1981 | History | Northwestern University | 1973 |
| Tim Wirth | Democratic | Colorado | 1987–1993 | Marketing | Stanford University | 1973 |
| Gary Hart | Democratic | Colorado | 1975–1987 | Politics | St. Antony's College, Oxford | 2001 |
| Daniel Patrick Moynihan | Democratic | New York | 1977–2001 | History | Tufts University | 1961 |
| S. I. Hayakawa | Republican | California | 1977–1983 | English | University of Wisconsin–Madison | 1935 |
| John Porter East | Republican | North Carolina | 1981–1986 | Political science | University of Florida | 1964 |
| Harrison Schmitt | Republican | New Mexico | 1977–1983 | Geology | Harvard University | 1964 |
| Phil Gramm | Republican | Texas | 1985–2002 | Economics | University of Georgia | 1967 |
| Paul Wellstone | Democratic | Minnesota | 1991–2002 | Political Science | University of North Carolina at Chapel Hill | 1969 |
| Ben Sasse | Republican | Nebraska | 2015–2023 | History | Yale University | 2004 |
| Kyrsten Sinema | Independent | Arizona | 2019–2025 | Justice Studies | Arizona State University | 2012 |

==== Current representatives ====
| Name | Party | State | Term | Field | Institution | Year |
|---|---|---|---|---|---|---|
| Alma Adams | Democrat | NC-12 | 2014– | Art Education and Multicultural Education | Ohio State University | 1981 |
| Jim Baird | Republican | IN-4 | 2019– | Animal Science | University of Kentucky | 1975 |
| Danny K. Davis | Democrat | IL-7 | 1997– | Public Administration | Union Institute & University | 1977 |
| Robin Kelly | Democrat | IL-2 | 2013– | Political Science | Northern Illinois University | 2004 |
| Jerry McNerney | Democrat | CA-11 | 2006– | Mathematics | University of New Mexico | 1981 |
| Bill Foster | Democrat | IL-11 | 2008-2011, 2012– | Physics | Harvard University | 1984 |
| Judy Chu | Democrat | CA-27 | 2009– | Psychology | California School of Professional Psychology | 1979 |
| Shri Thanedar | Democrat | MI-13 | 2023– | Chemistry (Polymers/Organometallics) | University of Akron | 1982 |
| Tom Cole | Republican | OK-4 | 2003– | British History | University of Oklahoma | 1984 |
| Mike Turner | Republican | OH-10 | 2003– | Urban Development (D.L.S.) | Georgetown University | 2022 |
| Dina Titus | Democrat | NV-1 | 2009– | Political Science | Florida State University | 1976 |
| Rob Wittman | Republican | VA-1 | 2007– | Public Health | Virginia Commonwealth University | 2002 |
| Alan Lowenthal | Democrat | CA-47 | 2013– | Psychology | Ohio State University | 1967 |
| Julia Letlow | Republican | LA-05 | 2021– | Communications | University of South Florida | 2012 |
| Henry Cuellar | Democrat | TX-28 | 2005– | Government | University of Texas at Austin | 1981 |
| Randy Feenstra | Republican | IA-4 | 2021– | Business | Northcentral University | 2022 |
| Jay Obernolte | Republican | CA-23 | 2021- | Public Administration | California Baptist University | 2020 |
| Johnny Olszewski | Democrat | MD-2 | 2025– | Government Administration (public policy) | University of Maryland, Baltimore County | 2017 |
| Derek Schmidt | Republican | KS-2 | 2025– | Law (SJD) | University of Kansas School of Law | 2015 |

==== Former representatives ====
| Name | Party | District | Term | Field | Institution | Year |
|---|---|---|---|---|---|---|
| Phil Gramm | Republican | Tx-06 | 1979–1983 | Economics | University of Georgia | 1967 |
| Dick Armey | Republican | Tx-26 | 1985–2003 | Economics | University of Oklahoma | 1968 |
| Phil Crane | Republican | IL-31; IL-12; IL-8 | 1969–2005 | History | Indiana University | 1961 |
| Tim Wirth | Democratic | Colorado | 1975–1987 | Marketing | Stanford University | 1973 |
| Kyrsten Sinema | Democrat | AZ-9 | 2012–2019 | Justice Studies | Arizona State University | 2012 |
| Rush D. Holt Jr. | Democrat | NJ-12 | 1999–2014 | Physics | NYU | 1981 |
| Howard Wolpe | Democrat | MI-03 | 1979–1993 | Political science | MIT | 1967 |
| Les Aspin | Democrat | WI-01 | 1971–1993 | Economics | MIT | 1966 |
| James G. Martin | Republican | NC-09 | 1973–1985 | Chemistry | Princeton University | 1960 |
| Donald L. Ritter | Republican | PA-15 | 1979–1993 | Physical Metallurgy | Massachusetts Institute of Technology | 1966 |
| David Price | Democrat | NC–04 | 1987–1995; 1997–2023 | Political Science | Yale | 1969 |
| Heather Wilson | Republican | NM-1 | 1998–2009 | International Relations | Jesus College, Oxford | 1985 |
| Vern Ehlers | Republican | MI-03 | 1993–2011 | Nuclear Physics | UC Berkeley | 1960 |
| Bud Shuster | Republican | PA-09 | 1973–2001 | Business and economics | American University | 1967 |
| Roscoe Bartlett | Republican | MD-06 | 1993–2013 | Physiology | University of Maryland, College Park | 1952 |
| John Olver | Democrat | MA-1 | 1991–2013 | Chemistry | Massachusetts Institute of Technology | 1961 |
| Clarence Long | Democrat | MD-2 | 1963–1985 | Economics | Princeton University | 1938 |
| Mervyn Dymally | Democrat | CA-31 | 1981–1993 | Human behavior | United States International University | 1978 |
| Philip R. Sharp | Democrat | IN-10 IN-02 | 1975–1995 | Government | Georgetown University | 1974 |
| Bob Filner | Democrat | CA-50 CA-51 | 1993–2012 | History of science | Cornell | 1969 |
| Tom Lantos | Democrat | CA-11 CA-12 | 1981–2008 | Economics | University of California, Berkeley | 1953 |
| Newt Gingrich | Republican | GA-06 | 1979–1999 | History | Tulane University | 1971 |
| G. William Whitehurst | Republican | VA-02 | 1969–1987 | History | West Virginia University | 1952 |
| Floyd Fithian | Democrat | IN-02 | 1975–1983 | American History | University of Nebraska–Lincoln | 1964 |
| John Brademas | Democrat | IN-03 | 1959–1981 | Social Studies | Brasenose College, Oxford | 1954 |
| Weston E. Vivian | Democrat | MI-02 | 1965–1967 | Electrical Engineering | University of Michigan | 1959 |
| Chris Gibson | Republican | NY-19 | 2011–2017 | Government | Cornell University | 1998 |
| Timothy F. Murphy | Republican | PA-18 | 2003–2017 | Clinical Psychology | University of Pittsburgh | 1979 |
| Dave Brat | Republican | VA-7 | 2014–2019 | Economics | American University | 1995 |
| Dan Lipinski | Democrat | IL-03 | 2005–2021 | Political Science | Duke University | 1998 |
| Derek Kilmer | Democrat | WA–06 | 2013–2025 | Social Policy | Oxford University | 2003 |
| Jody Hice | Republican | GA-10 | 2015–2023 | Ministry | Luther Rice College and Seminary | 1988 |
| Dave Loebsack | Democrat | IA-2 | 2007–2021 | Political Science | University of California, Davis | 1985 |
| Donna Shalala | Democrat | FL-27 | 2019–2021 | Political Science | Syracuse University | 1970 |
| Andy Kim | Democrat | NJ-03 | 2019–2024 | International Relations | Oxford University | 2010 |
| Carolyn Bourdeaux | Democrat | GA-7 | 2021–2023 | Public Administration | Syracuse University | 2003 |
| Mike Gallagher | Republican | WI-8 | 2017–2024 | International Relations | Georgetown University | 2015 |
| Jamaal Bowman | Democrat | NY-16 | 2021–2025 | Educational leadership | Manhattanville College | 2019 |

== State governments ==
=== State executives ===
==== Current governors ====
| Name | Party | State | Term | Field | Institution | Year |
|---|---|---|---|---|---|---|
| Tony Evers | Democrat | Wisconsin | 2019– | Educational administration | University of Wisconsin–Madison | 1986 |

==== Former governors ====
| Name | Party | State | Term | Field | Institution | Year |
|---|---|---|---|---|---|---|
| Dixy Lee Ray | Democrat | Washington | 1977–1981 | Biology | Stanford University | 1945 |
| John H. Sununu | Republican | New Hampshire | 1983–1989 | Mechanical Engineering | Massachusetts Institute of Technology | 1966 |
| Kenny Guinn | Republican | Nevada | 1999–2007 | Education | Utah State University | 1970 |
| James G. Martin | Republican | North Carolina | 1985–1993 | Chemistry | Princeton University | 1960 |
| Lee S. Dreyfus | Republican | Wisconsin | 1979–1983 | Communication | University of Wisconsin–Madison | 1957 |
| Neil Abercrombie | Democrat | Hawaii | 2010–2014 | American Studies | University of Hawaiʻi at Mānoa | 1960s |
| Ted Strickland | Democrat | Ohio | 2007–2011 | Psychology | University of Kentucky | 1980 |
| Eric Greitens | Republican | Missouri | 2017–2018 | Politics | Lady Margaret Hall, Oxford | 2000 |
| Ricardo Rosselló | New Progressive | Puerto Rico | 2017–2019 | Biomedical Engineering | University of Michigan | 2007 |
| Gina Raimondo | Democrat | Rhode Island | 2015–2021 | Sociology | New College, Oxford | 2002 |
| Tom Wolf | Democrat | Pennsylvania | 2015–2023 | Political Science | Massachusetts Institute of Technology | 1981 |

==== Former lieutenant governors ====
| Name | Party | State | Term | Field | Institution | Year |
|---|---|---|---|---|---|---|
| Sue Ellspermann | Republican | Indiana | 2013–2016 | Industrial Engineering | University of Louisville | 1997 |
