= Betty A. Rosa =

American educator

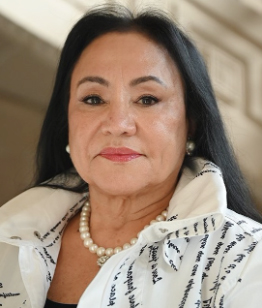

16th Commissioner of Education of the State of New York
- Incumbent
- Assumed office February 8, 2021
- Governors: Andrew Cuomo; Kathy Hochul
- Preceded by: Shannon L. Tahoe

Chancellor of the Board of Regents of the University of the State of New York
- In office 2016–2020
- Preceded by: Merryl H. Tisch
- Succeeded by: Lester W. Young, Jr

Personal details
- Education: City College of New York (BA); Lehman College (MS); Harvard University (EdD)
- Profession: Educator
- Website: https://www.nysed.gov/commissioner-bio

Betty A. Rosa is an American educator and the Commissioner of the New York State Education Department and serves as the President of the University of the State of New York. Prior to becoming Commissioner, Rosa served as the Chancellor of the New York State Education Department, governing the Board of Regents.

== Education ==
Rosa was born in New York City, and was in Puerto Rico for the early part of her childhood. She taught in New York schools in Manhattan and the Bronx. She became an assistant principal, principal, district superintendent and senior superintendent of the Bronx.

She has a BA in psychology and a master's degree in Administration and Supervision from the City College of New York (CUNY), a master's degree from Lehman College in bilingual education and an EdM and EdD from Harvard University in Administration, Planning and Social Policy.

She was elected as Regents chancellor in 2016, and in 2021 she was named the New York State Education Commissioner.

The Albany Times Union reported in February 2025 that Rosa got a $150,000 raise, bringing her salary to $489,000. In addition, she receives a government pension of $120,000 a year for her work as a New York City teacher and administrator.

== Honors and awards ==
In 2017 Lehman College gave Rosa an honorary doctorate.
