= Frank Pierrepont Graves =

American academic administrator (1869–1956)

Frank P. Graves
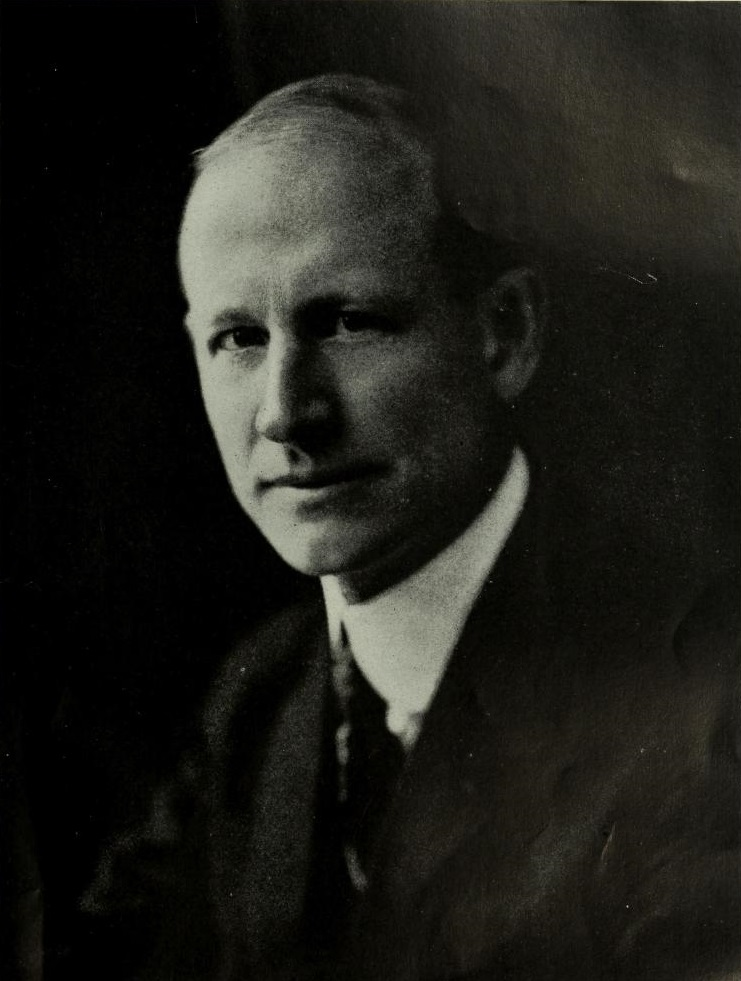

3rd Commissioner of Education of the State of New York
- In office 1921–1940
- Preceded by: John H. Finley
- Succeeded by: Ernest E. Cole

Personal details
- Born: July 23, 1869 Brooklyn, New York
- Died: September 13, 1956 (aged 87) Albany, New York
- Party: Republican
- Spouses: Helen Hope Wadsworth (m. 1895; died 1943): Jessie Chase Malcolm
- Education: Columbia University
- Profession: Educator

Frank Pierrepont Graves (July 23, 1869 – September 13, 1956) was an American education administrator. He served as the 3rd president of the University of Wyoming from 1896 to 1898, as the 13th president of the University of Washington from 1898 to 1902, and as the 3rd Commissioner of Education of New York State from 1921 to 1940.

== Early life and education ==
Graves was born in Brooklyn, New York on July 23, 1869. He was educated in the Brooklyn Public schools, and attended Columbia University, earning an A.B. in 1889 and a Ph.D. in Greek in 1892. He gained membership in Phi Beta Kappa, Phi Delta Kappa, and Phi Beta Phi.

== Career ==
=== Academia ===
Graves taught Greek at Columbia University for two years and at Tufts College for five. He served as the 3rd president of the State University of Wyoming from 1896 to 1898, and as the 13th president of the University of Washington from 1898 to 1902. Both institutions quadrupled their enrollment during his tenure.

This experience heightened Dr. Graves' interest in the history of education; and so he returned to Columbia and earned another Doctorate, this time in Education. Graves went on to become professor of the History of Education at the University of Missouri, Ohio State University, and the University of Pennsylvania, over a period from 1904 to 1921. During this time he also taught at the University of Wisconsin, the University of Chicago, and at Columbia.

=== Commissioner in New York ===
Graves became Commissioner of the New York State Education Department in 1921, and held that post under six governors, for nearly two decades. Under his tenure, the state took major steps in rural school consolidation, an important, if often very controversial, endeavor. Graves is the longest-serving commissioner in the history of the department to date. During his tenure, Graves was elected to the American Philosophical Society in 1927. After his retirement, he passed the bar exam in 1943. By the end of his career, Graves held 43 academic degrees. In 1937, Graves ruled that Rose Freistater was ineligible to be issued a teaching license for being overweight.

== Personal life ==
In 1895, Graves married Helen Hope Wadsworth. His wife Helen died in 1943, and he remarried to Jessie Chase Malcolm.

Graves died in Albany on September 13, 1956.

== Selected publications ==
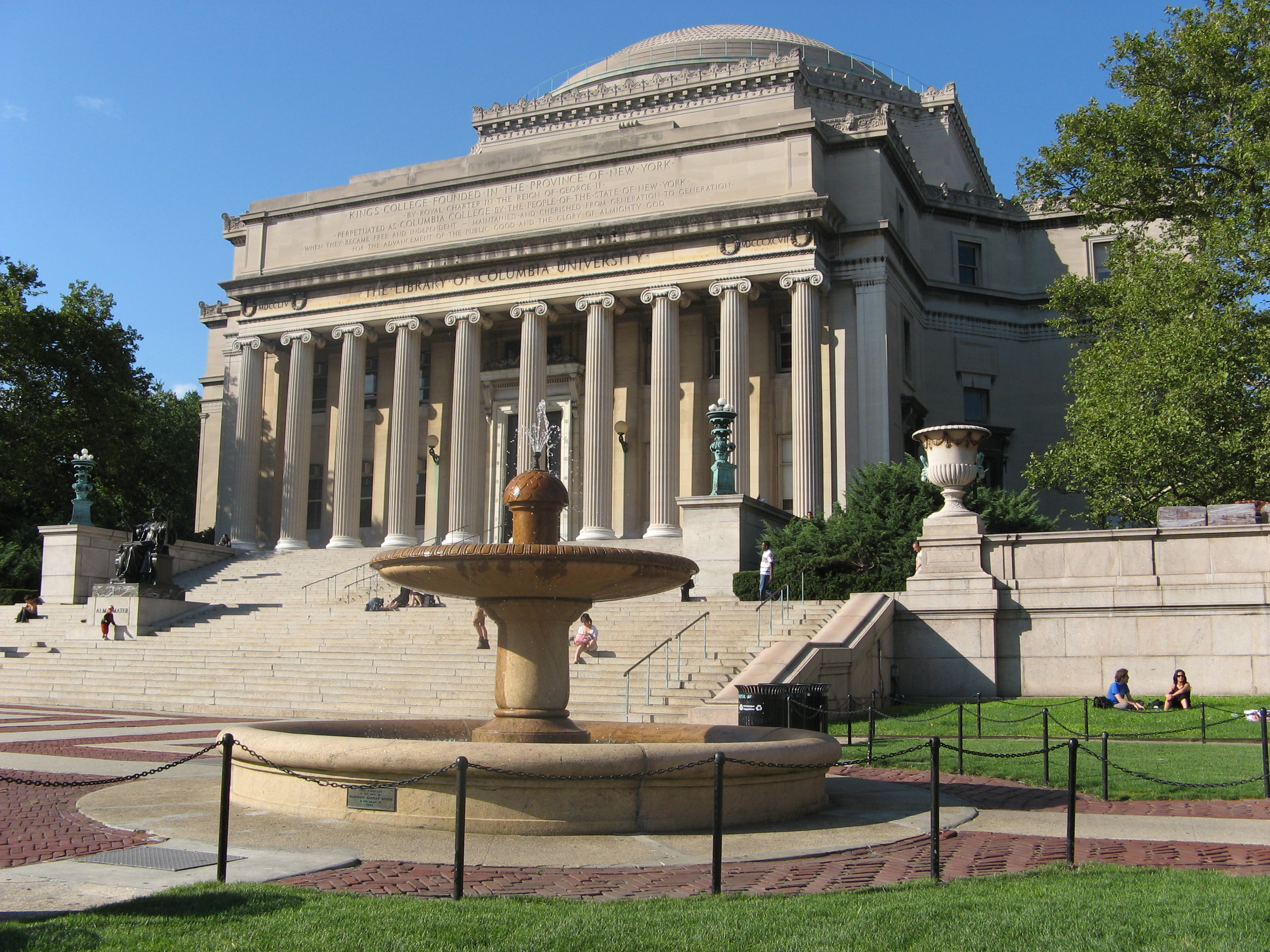
Low Memorial Library at Graves' alma mater, Columbia University

- Burial Customs of the Greeks, (Columbia University)
- A History of Education Before the Middle Ages, (MacMillan)
- A History of Education During the Middle Ages, (MacMillan)
- A History of Education in Modern Times, (MacMillan)
- Great Educators of Three Centuries, (MacMillan)
- Peter Ramus and the Educational Renaissance of the Sixteenth Century, (MacMillan)
- A Student's History of Education, (MacMillan)
- What Did Jesus Teach?, (MacMillan)

== See also ==
- Educational Review
