= James E. Allen Jr. =

American politician (1911–1971)

James Allen

United States Commissioner of Education
- In office May 5, 1969 – June 10, 1970
- President: Richard Nixon
- Preceded by: Harold Howe
- Succeeded by: Sidney Marland

Personal details
- Born: James Edward Allen Jr. April 25, 1911 Elkins, West Virginia, U.S.
- Died: October 16, 1971 (aged 60) Peach Springs, Arizona, U.S.
- Education: Davis and Elkins College (BA); Harvard University (MA, PhD)

James Edward Allen Jr. (April 25, 1911 – October 16, 1971) was the Commissioner of Education of the State of New York from 1955 to 1969 and served briefly as Richard Nixon's U.S. Commissioner of Education. He ordered New York school boards to comply with the 1962 U. S. Supreme Court order banning prayer in New York schools and began desegregation of New York Public Schools.

== Biography ==
Allen was born in Elkins, West Virginia, on April 25, 1911. His father was a Presbyterian minister and he earned his Bachelor of Arts degree from Davis & Elkins College in 1932. He worked for the West Virginia State Department of Education for six years before attending Harvard University, where he earned his master's degree in education in 1942 and his Ph.D. in 1945. In 1947, he went to work for the New York Department of Education. He became Deputy Commissioner of Education in 1950 and Commissioner in 1955.

In 1960, he was opposed to school districts drawn up along racial lines and began having local school boards redraw boundaries to end racial disparities in 1962. In June 1962, the Supreme Court banned prayer in New York public schools, an order Allen directed local school boards to follow. In 1969, President Richard Nixon appointed him U.S. Commissioner of Education. His strong support for desegregation caused friction however, and President Nixon removed him the following year. He went from there to the Woodrow Wilson School of Public and International Affairs at Princeton. He and his wife died in a plane crash on October 16, 1971, in Arizona.

== Sources ==
- Lichtenstein, Nelson et al. Political Profiles. Volume 3, "The Kennedy Years." pp 7–8. New York: Facts On File, Inc., 1976.

Political offices
| Preceded by Lewis Wilson | New York Commissioner of Education; 1955–1969 | Succeeded by Ewald Nyquist |
| Preceded by Harold Howe | United States Commissioner of Education; 1969–1970 | Succeeded by Sidney Marland |
