= MaryEllen Elia =

American educator (born 1948)

15th Commissioner of Education of the State of New York
- In office May 25, 2015 – August 31, 2019
- Preceded by: John King, Jr.
- Succeeded by: Betty A. Rosa

Personal details
- Born: 1948 (age 77–78)
- Profession: Educator

MaryEllen Elia (born 1948) is an American educator.

She served for ten years as superintendent of Hillsborough County Public Schools in Tampa, Florida, but was fired by the school board, after a number of incidents that eroded the board's trust in her.

Elia later served as New York State Education Commissioner. In that role, she gained recognition for easing tensions surrounding implementation of the Common Core State Standards Initiative and the question of how to evaluate teachers. She provoked controversy over the removal of school aid from struggling schools, the delayed removal of an outspoken Buffalo School Board member, and a directive requiring private schools to come into compliance with state standards. She resigned as education commissioner on August 31, 2019.

== Early life ==
MaryEllen Elia was born and raised in Western New York. She attended high school in Lewiston and attended Daemen College in Buffalo, from where she obtained her Bachelor of Arts. She received her Master of Education and Master of Professional Studies in reading from the University at Buffalo.

== Career ==
Elia started her career in education in 1970 as a social studies teacher in Buffalo's Sweet Home Central School District, a position she held for 19 years.

=== Hillsborough County Public Schools ===
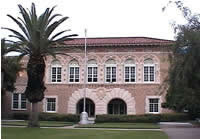
Henry B. Plant High School

After moving to Tampa, Florida, Elia was hired in 1986 as a reading resource teacher at Henry B. Plant High School.

In 2005, Elia was appointed superintendent of Tampa's Hillsborough County Public Schools, the eighth largest in the United States. In 2009, the district received a $100 million grant from the Bill and Melinda Gates Foundation to overhaul its teacher evaluation system using student standardized test scores as a rubric. Under the new system, 40 percent of teachers’ evaluations is based on their students’ improvement on tests, and 60 percent is based on observations by principals and peers. She negotiated a merit pay system with the teachers union that allowed some new teachers to earn more than veteran teachers, a concept that teachers’ unions generally oppose. Elia supported school choice and the Gates-funded Common Core State Standards Initiative, even though Florida would eventually pull out of the program.

The average life of a superintendent is between three and four years. I had 10 years ... there was not an overwhelming majority of people in our community that called for me to be out. I’m moving forward now, and I’m not really concentrating on the past.

— Elia upon her firing from Hillsborough County Public Schools.

In December 2014, Elia was named state Superintendent of the Year for 2015. But her relationship with the school board was rocky, having had repeated clashes with them, and in the next month the school board voted 4 to 3 to fire Elia without cause, with 2 1/2 years left on her contract. One of the board members, Cindy Stuart, stated that there existed a "broken relationship between board members and the superintendent that was beyond repair." Stuart said in an interview that a number of incidents had eroded the board’s trust in Elia, including one in which a 7-year-old special education student had slumped forward on a school bus and stopped breathing, and later died. The board would only find out about the tragedy ten months later because of a lawsuit filed by the girl's parents. Elia was criticized by employees who said her management style was heavy-handed, for her tough disciplinary policy which disproportionately affected African-American students, and for presiding over a lack of services for students with special needs. Others were upset about her salary negotiated years earlier amid a lack of transparency, in which she received a base salary of $289,000 and benefits that brought total compensation to about $400,000. Upon her dismissal, Elia received a buyout worth $1.1 million in salary, benefits and unused vacation and sick time.

=== New York State Education Commissioner ===
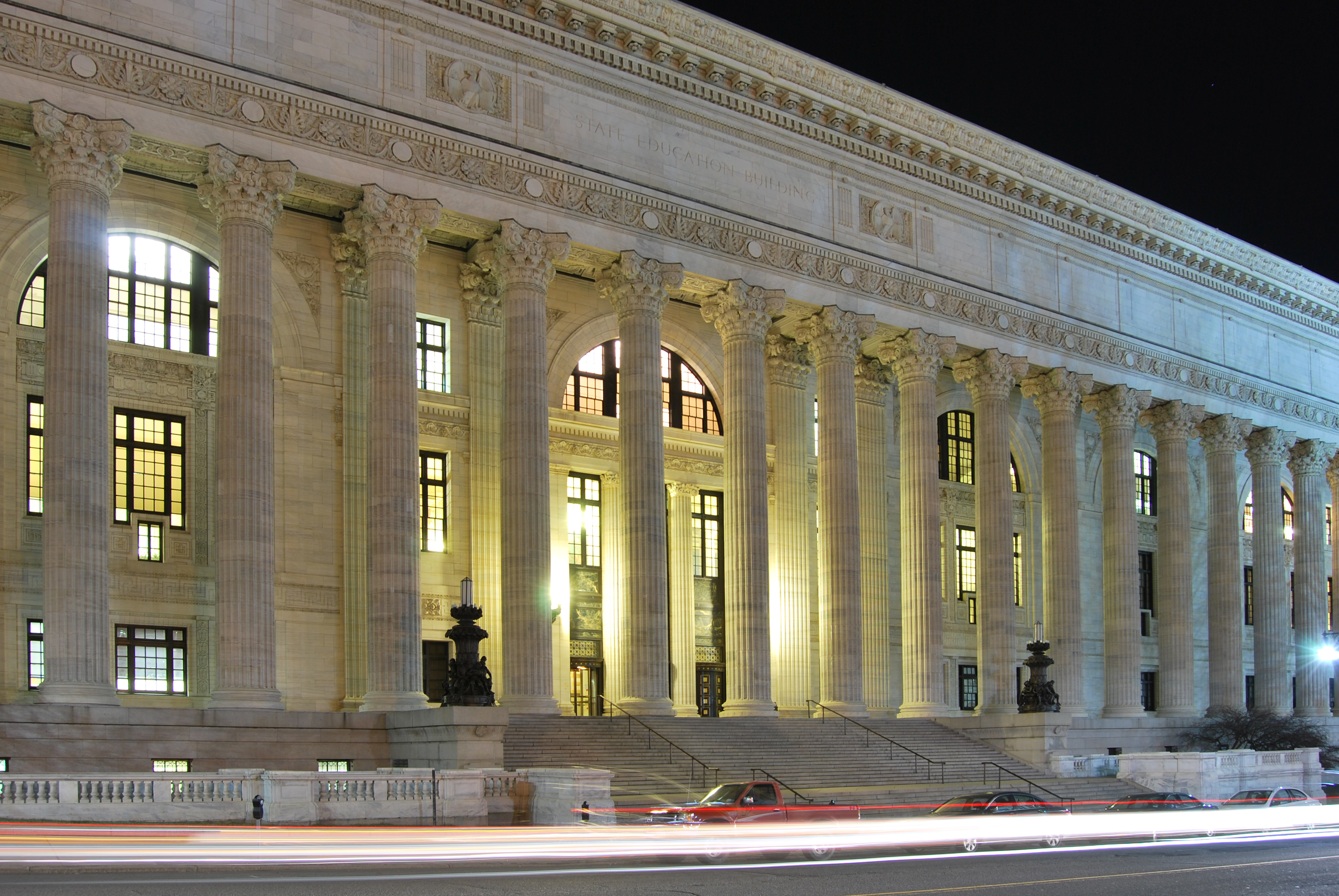
New York State Education Building

In 2015, after a closed door meeting, members of the New York State Board of Regents voted unanimously to appoint Elia to the position of New York State Education Commissioner, replacing John King Jr.—who left the post amid controversy over his education reform program—who went on to become a senior adviser to Arne Duncan, the United States Secretary of Education. Elia's arrival in New York came at a time when the education scene had been characterized by low test scores, well-funded special-interest groups, angry parents and a New York State Legislature that had become more active on education policy, it having been in conflict with Governor Andrew Cuomo on these issues. Elia's tenure coincided with the looming uncertainty of full implementation of the Common Core State Standards Initiative in the state's classrooms, the use of standardized testing and the question of how to evaluate teachers. Randi Weingarten, the president of the American Federation of Teachers, offered measured praise, saying that while the union was "opposed to high-stakes testing" and grading teachers on students’ test performance, "even when MaryEllen applied it as required under Florida law, she made collaboration her mantra."

==== Removal of school aid ====
Governor Cuomo's office criticized Elia on May 18, 2016 for removing the label "struggling schools" from 34 failing New York City public schools, among 70 such schools statewide, even though they still get dismal test scores, causing them to lose $8.5 million in funding and other help. In pulling the schools off the list, Elia asserted that she was just following the law passed by the governor in 2015, which identified 144 troubled schools to receive extra funding, though an administration official offered a different interpretation of the law that would have allowed the schools to remain on the list. Cuomo administration spokeswoman Dani Lever said, "It can only be explained as shilling for the educational bureaucracy and special interests at the expense of children. On September 13, 2016, Elia announced that 21 troubled schools would receive $52 million in state aid.

==== Delayed removal of Carl Paladino from school board ====
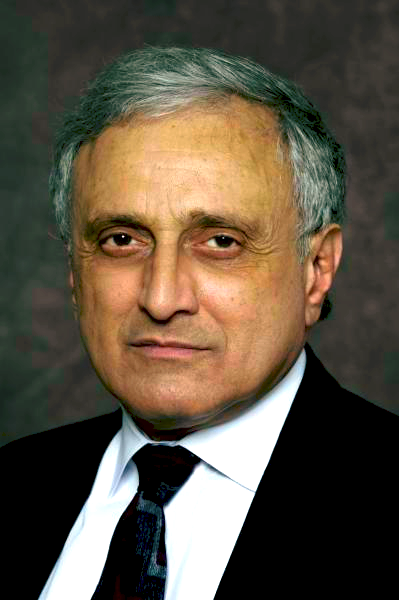
Carl Paladino

On December 23, 2016, Carl Paladino, a member of the Buffalo School Board, took part in an interview with alternative weekly newspaper Artvoice. When asked what he would like to see happen in 2017, Paladino replied it was President Barack Obama dying of mad cow disease, stating: "Obama catches mad cow disease after being caught having relations with a Her[e]ford. He dies before his trial and is buried in a cow pasture next to [senior White House advisor] Valerie Jarret[t], who died weeks prior, after being convicted of sedition and treason, when a Jihady [sic] cell mate mistook her for being a nice person and decapitated her." After then being asked "what he would most like to see go in 2017", he replied: "Michelle Obama. I'd like her to return to being a male and let loose in the outback of Zimbabwe where she lives comfortably in a cave with Maxie, the gorilla." The statements sparked backlash and outrage. New York Governor Andrew Cuomo released a statement calling Paladino's remarks "racist, ugly, reprehensible remarks," while Buffalo School Board president Barbara Nevergold called for Paladino to be ousted from his position, arguing that if a student had made Paladino's comments on social media, they would have been suspended. Erie County Executive Mark Poloncarz called for Paladino to resign and Trump's transition team called his comments "absolutely reprehensible".

On December 23, Paladino was contacted by The Buffalo News, who inquired whether he really made the comments. Paladino replied "of course I did" and told the editors to "go fuck themselves" for making the inquiry. Paladino later posted a "defiant" apology on Facebook.

On December 28, the school board demanded Paladino's ouster in a December 2016 resolution signed by six members of the nine-member board. The resolution stated: "These unambiguously racist, morally repugnant, flagrantly disrespectful, inflammatory and inexcusable comments by Mr. Paladino have garnered both local, national, and international attention that reflects negatively on the Buffalo Board of Education, the City of Buffalo and its leadership and its citizens." The resolution called upon Elia as State Education Commissioner to remove Paladino if he refused to resign. Under state law, the Education Commissioner may remove a board member for office for a violation of the law or willful neglect of duty; the board argues that Paladino's statement violates the Dignity for All Students Act, "which requires school districts to provide students with an environment free of discrimination, harassment and bullying."

Subsequently, four groups filed separate petitions to Elia to remove Paladino from office: (1) the school board; (2) the teachers' union (the Buffalo Teachers Federation and the New York State United Teachers); the (3) Buffalo Parent-Teacher Organization and Buffalo NAACP chapter; and (4) the District Parent Coordinating Council. Two petitions also sought, as an interim measure, the immediate suspension of Paladino's functions as a board member. Several of the petitions argue for Paladino's removal on the basis of his public sharing of information discussed in executive session related to negotiations for a new contract with Buffalo teachers.

In February 2017, Elia declined to immediately suspend Paladino from the board, as the State Education Department continued to review the petitions seeking Paladino's permanent removal. In April 2017, Paladino filed papers with the commissioner seeking a delay in the administrative hearings against him while he pursues a lawsuit claiming a conspiracy to remove him from the school board. Demonstrators have continued to advocate for Paladino's removal.

After the public hearing, Elia announced Paladino's removal from the board on August 17, 2017, effective immediately, citing the violation of executive session rules.

==== Support of Holocaust high school assignment ====
In what he deemed a "stab in the back to Holocaust survivors," state assemblyman Dov Hikind called for Elia's resignation on April 3, 2017, for her support of an Oswego High School assignment that asked students to put themselves in Adolf Hitler's shoes to argue for or against the Final Solution. Elia had defended the assignment as one that fostered "critical thinking."

==== Oversight over private schools and resignation ====
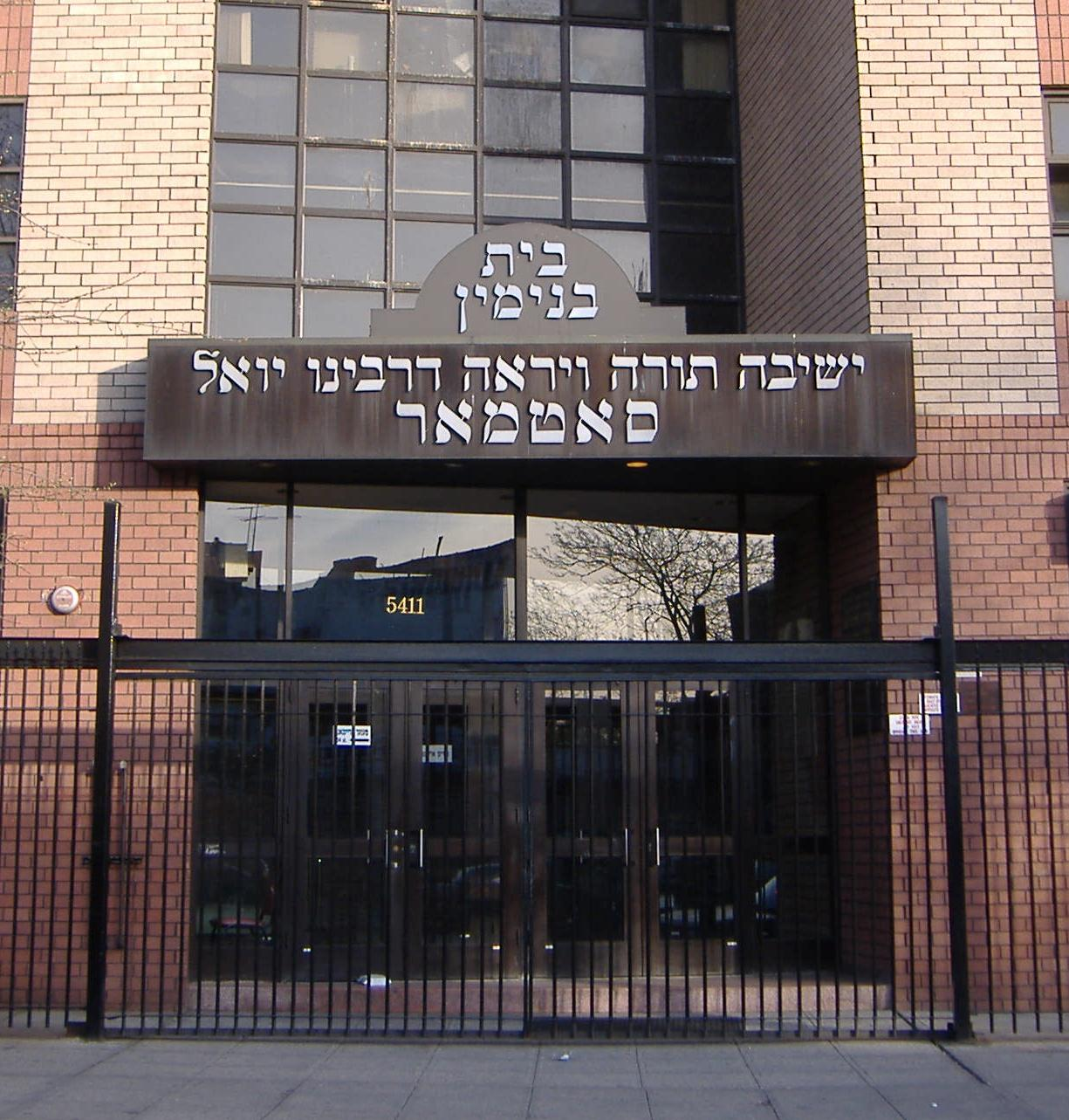
Satmar yeshiva in Brooklyn, New York

In 2018, a controversial budget amendment passed by state senator Simcha Felder watered down educational requirements for yeshivas operating in New York, even while current state law requires that a student in a non-public school should be "receiving instruction which is substantially equivalent to that provided in the public schools," with the local public school superintendent being the arbiter of what that equivalency entails.

We want to ensure that all students receive the education they are entitled to under state Education Law, no matter which school they attend.

— MaryEllen Elia

Elia subsequently issued a directive to all yeshivas operating in New York to come into compliance with statewide educational standards, or face the penalty of losing public funding currently earmarked for record – keeping, school meals and computers. Specifically, a curriculum that included 34 hours a week of English, mathematics, science and art instruction with "competent" teachers would now be required, which translates into 180 minutes per subject per week. The schools would be checked for compliance by state regulators, and if found to be lacking, parents would have 30 to 45 days to put their kids in another school, or risk having them declared truants.

Satmar rebbe Aaron Teitelbaum urged private schools not to comply while speaking about the failures of the public school system and the successes of Yeshiva graduates. He compared the guidelines to a long history of oppression against Jewish education, saying "...we will launch a major war against the Commissioner of Education in any way [necessary] without compromises and agreements." Rockland County legislator Aron Wieder called it a war on the religious community. A petition that drew over 50,000 signatures was sent to Elia to asking her to backtrack on the proposal. Elya Brudny and Yisroel Reisman, two rosh yeshivas (deans) from Brooklyn, New York, complained about being rebuffed by Elia when they tried to negotiate with her about the measures. Chaim Deutsch, a New York City councilman, suggested that the Jewish community would fight back against the "onerous" and "intrusive" new guidelines.

The leaders of New York's 500 Catholic schools said that they would boycott a proposed new review system.

Elia submitted her resignation letter to the New York Board of Regents on July 15, 2019, citing a move to an unnamed national company that provides services to students.

== Personal life ==
Elia is married to Albert Elia, whom she met in high school.

Government offices
Preceded by John King Jr.	New York Commissioner of Education; 2015-2019	Succeeded by Shannon L. Tahoe
