= Malloy Nesmith Sr. =

American basketball player

Malloy Nesmith Sr. is a former streetball player from New York City. He is originally from The Bronx, NY. In high school, he played at James Monroe High School (New York City), finishing in 1988. He played college ball at Utah State He left because of academics and dislike of the schools slow basketball style of play. He is considered to be a legendary streetball player and point guard who played at Rucker Park. He played as part of the Bad Boy Entertainment Squad. At the Rucker, he played against a number of NBA stars. He was the subject of a book, Swee'pea: The Story of Lloyd Daniels and Other Playground Basketball Legends. He was a regular at the Entertainers Ball Classic. He was featured in the NBA dribbling commercial. He played professionally at the Dominican Republic with the Gregorio Urbano Gilbert
