= James Cole Jr. =

American lawyer

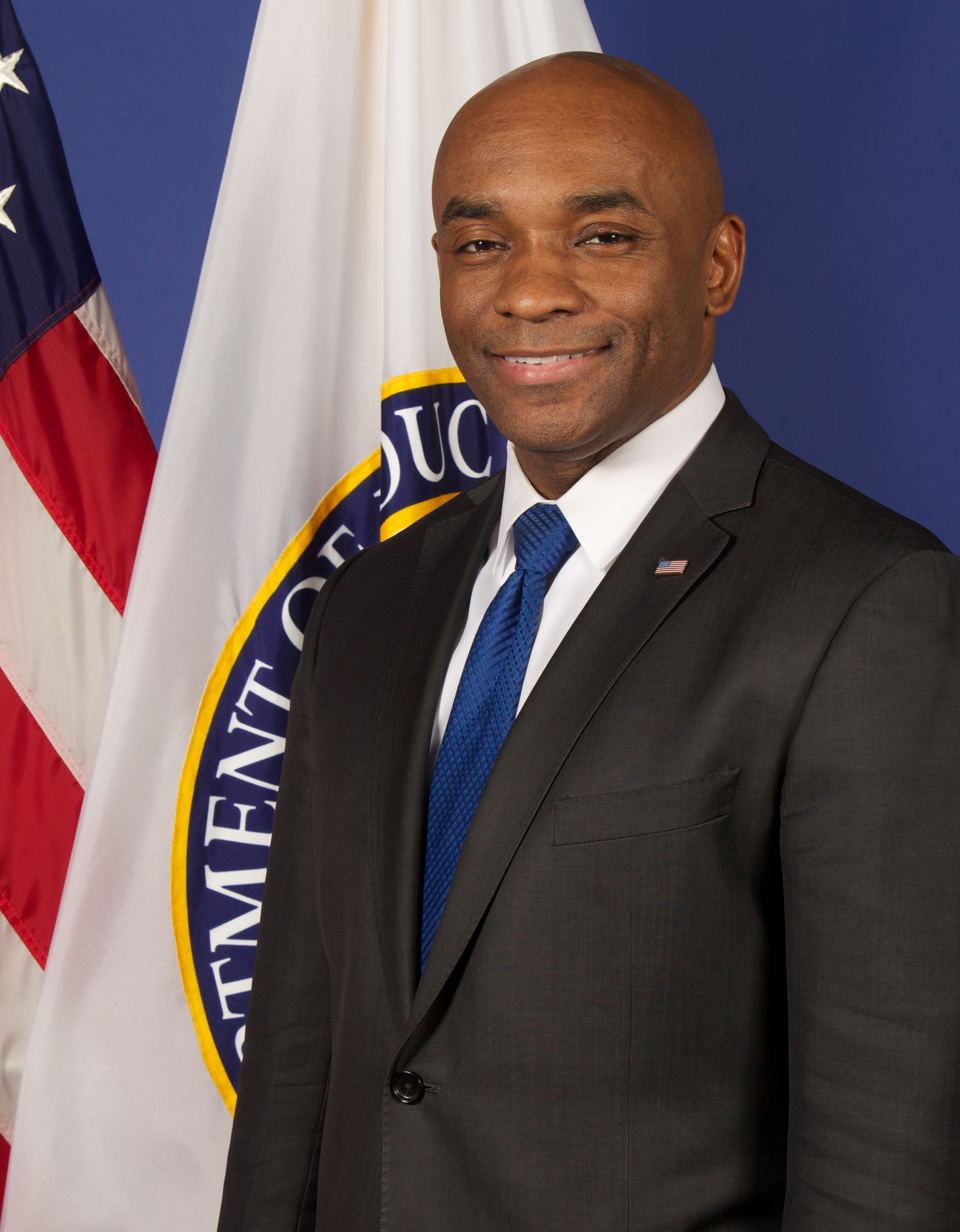

Acting United States Deputy Secretary of Education
- In office March 14, 2016 – January 20, 2017
- President: Barack Obama
- Preceded by: John King Jr. (acting)
- Succeeded by: Mick Zais

General Counsel of the United States Department of Education
- In office December 2014 – January 20, 2017
- President: Barack Obama
- Succeeded by: Carlos G. Muñiz

Personal details
- Education: University of Illinois at Urbana–Champaign; University of Chicago Law School

James Cole Jr. is an American attorney who served as the acting Deputy Secretary of Education from 2016 to 2017, serving under the Obama administration.

== Education ==
Cole received his Bachelor of Science in finance with honors from the University of Illinois at Urbana-Champaign, and his J.D. degree from the University of Chicago Law School, where he served as a comment editor of the University of Chicago Law School Roundtable.

== Department of Education ==
=== General Counsel for Department of Education ===
On June 10, 2013, President Barack Obama nominated Cole as General Counsel. He was then confirmed by the Senate as the department's general counsel in December 2014.

=== Acting Deputy Secretary of Education ===
Delegated the duties of Deputy Secretary on January 28, 2016, Cole served as the chief operating officer and chief legal officer and oversaw a broad range of operational, management, policy, legal and program functions at the department. Cole also oversaw the department's work on President Obama's My Brother's Keeper Task Force.

== Department of Transportation ==
From 2011 to 2014 Cole served as the deputy general counsel of the United States Department of Transportation. In this role he advised the secretary, deputy secretary and general counsel on legal, policy and program matters relating to DOT's 10 operating administrations, including the Federal Aviation Administration, Federal Highway Administration and Federal Railroad Administration.

== Legal career ==
From 2004 to 2011, he served on the board of directors of the NAACP Legal Defense and Educational Fund. From 2005 to 2011, he also served on the board of trustees of Prep for Prep, a New York City-based youth leadership development program that identifies and prepares students of color for the rigors of independent day and boarding schools. In addition, he has mentored high school and college students since graduating from Dunbar Vocational High School, located in Chicago.

From 1996 to 2011, Cole worked at the law firm of Wachtell, Lipton, Rosen & Katz in New York City, where, in 2004, he became a partner in the corporate department. He has advised a broad range of public and private companies in a variety of industries in the United States and around the world.

Prior to joining Wachtell, Lipton, Cole clerked for Judge Stephanie K. Seymour of the United States Court of Appeals for the Tenth Circuit.

Legal offices
| Preceded by ??? | General Counsel of the United States Department of Education; 2014-2017 | Succeeded by Carlos G. Muñiz |
Political offices
| Preceded by John King Jr. | United States Deputy Secretary of Education; Acting; 2016–2017 | Succeeded by Mick Zais |
