= University of the State of New York =

Governmental umbrella organization in New York State

Agency overview
- Formed: 1784; 242 years ago
- Jurisdiction: New York
- Motto: Excelsior
- Agency executives: Betty A. Rosa, President; Lester W. Young Jr., Chancellor of the Board; Judith Chin, Vice-Chancellor of the Board
- Website: regents.nysed.gov

The University of the State of New York (USNY, /ˈjuːzniː/) is the governmental umbrella organization of New York State that oversees all educational and cultural institutions, including pre-kindergarten programs, kindergartens, schools, colleges, universities, libraries, and museums. It is governed by the Board of Regents.

Despite the name, the University of the State of New York is not an educational institution but rather a governmental licensing and accreditation body that sets standards for schools operating in New York State, from pre-kindergarten through professional and graduate school, as well as for the practice of a wide variety of professions.

== History ==
The Board of Regents of the University of the State of New York was established by statute on May 1, 1784, to re-establish and oversee King's College as Columbia University and any other colleges and academies incorporated in the state thereafter. On April 13, 1787, the legislature enacted a law that allowed individual educational institutions to have their own trustees (making Columbia a private institution) and gave the Regents broader responsibilities for overseeing education in New York. The new law empowered the Regents to "visit and inspect all the colleges, academies, and schools" in the state, award higher academic degrees, hold and distribute funds, and exercise other powers of a corporation.

Early in the 19th century, the Regents established standards for incorporating private academies and colleges, including specifying the texts or subjects that academies must teach to qualify for state aid. Aid was restricted to those students who had passed local entrance examinations. To combat the problem of academies lowering their standards in order to attract students and get state aid, during the later nineteenth century the Regents developed and instituted educational standards for high schools statewide, through use of the Regents examinations and syllabi.

The legislature gave the Regents responsibility for the New York State Library and New York State Museum in 1844 and 1845, respectively, and in 1889 and 1892 expanded the USNY's responsibilities significantly to include the incorporation and supervision of all libraries, museums, correspondence schools, and other educational institutions. An 1872 statute authorized the Regents to appoint examining and licensing boards in the state's medical schools, and in 1890 the Regents were given the exclusive power to license physicians. Also starting in 1890, the Secretary to the Board of Regents – then Melvil Dewey, also head of the State Library – supervised full-time inspectors of secondary schools, libraries, colleges, and other institutions reporting to the Regents. Starting in 1910, private trade schools were required to be licensed and inspected, and in 1923 licensing requirements were extended to correspondence schools operating in the state.

In 1948, New York State established a system of support organizations known as Boards of Cooperative Educational Services (BOCES) across the state. The head of each BOCES, known as the District Superintendent, acts as the New York State Commissioner of Education's, and by extension, the Chancellor of the Board of Regents', field representative.

=== Regents College ===
A key former initiative of the Board of Regents, created to better bring higher education to New York State's nontraditional adult learners, was the Board of Regents' Regents External Degree Program, or REX, which became Regents College in 1984 and then the separate and independent Excelsior College in 1998–2001. This program was an outgrowth of the practice of giving World War II veterans school and college credit in recognition of their military education and experience. In 1963 the Regents introduced College Proficiency Examinations, now called Excelsior College Examinations (ECEs), initially to help teachers and nurses complete educational requirements. First named the "Regents External Degree Program," it was established in 1971 with financial support from the Ford and Carnegie Foundations. Degrees could be granted based on a combination of college proficiency exams and classroom and correspondence courses, or on a variety of exams alone. The first degrees were conferred in 1972. This program became independent of the Education Department in 1991 but continued to be governed by the Board of Regents until 1998, at which time it fully separated from the Board of Regents to become a private, independent college. Up until that time it did not offer instruction, but in addition to its examinations, it accepted transfer credit from any regionally-accredited college. The school, prohibited by the terms of its "independence" agreement from continuing to use the name Regents College, adopted the name Excelsior College in 2001. Since the school offers both undergraduate and graduate programs, the institution decided to change the name again to Excelsior University in 2022. Excelsior University is now a constituent member of USNY in the same way that other institutions of higher education (including private colleges) in New York State are. Like them, it has its own charter and Board of Trustees.

== Current structure and functions ==
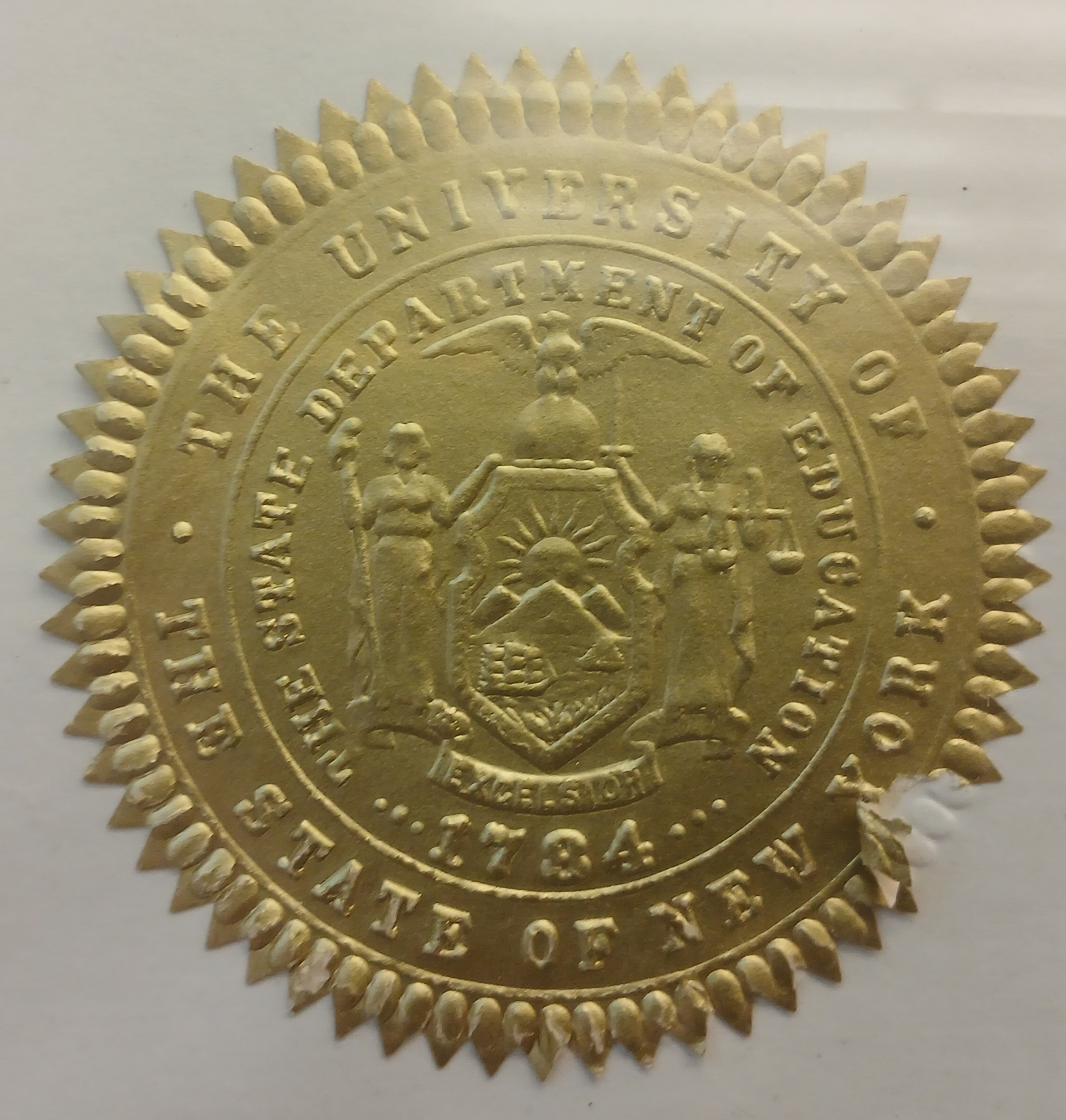
Seal of the University of the State of New York

The Board of Regents of the University of the State of New York oversees USNY. The Board includes 17 members elected by the New York State Legislature for five-year terms. Thirteen of the Regents represent the state's 13 judicial districts (one appointed from each district), and four are at-large. The Regents serve without salary.

USNY's affiliation and oversight are very broad. As a legal technicality, USNY includes all of the state's more than 7,000 public and private elementary and secondary schools; approximately 250 public and private colleges and universities; another approximately 250 proprietary (for-profit) schools; nearly 7,000 libraries; about 750 museums; all of the state's local historical societies; and 25 public broadcasting facilities. Also included in USNY are the State Archives; a special school for the blind and another special school for the deaf; as well as vocational rehabilitation and special education services. Additionally, USNY has the affiliation of, and oversight for, more than half a million professionals practicing in 58 licensed professions, ranging from accountancy to architecture to engineering to massage therapy to hair styling, as well as 200,000 public certified school teachers, counselors, and administrators. Certain education-related institutions (such as most museums) could exist in New York State without being part of USNY; however, as an example, most museums in New York State choose to be part of USNY (i.e., be chartered by the Board of Regents) in order to obtain tax-exempt nonprofit status and other benefits.

=== Relationship to the state education department ===
The state Education Law makes the Regents the head of the New York State Education Department. The Regents select a Commissioner of Education who both runs the Education Department and is president – that is, chief executive officer – of the University. The Board of Regents also elects a chancellor from among its members, who presides over the Regents' meetings and appoints its committees.

The New York State Education Department (NYSED) was created at the behest of former New York Governor Theodore Roosevelt in 1904. USNY has, as a subordinate unit, NYSED, including NYSED's various administrative personnel – furthermore, the various schools, colleges, libraries, museums, teachers, etc., of USNY form constituent units of USNY, whereas NYSED forms a constituent and subordinate component of USNY.

USNY, through its Board of Regents, generally uses NYSED as a vehicle to carry out policy created by the Regents. In other words, USNY's Board of Regents generally creates policy, whereas NYSED generally administers policy and the BOCES' District Superintendents help facilitate the roll-out of that policy in the field. The New York State Legislature can also create some education policy; such statutory education policy would become official education policy that the Commissioner of Education would also be responsible for administering.

=== Regents examinations and diplomas ===
Regents Examinations, tests administered to high school students to demonstrate mastery of various subjects, were established by the Regents and first administered in 1865. The Regents of USNY have set standards by which students may earn various levels of Regents diplomas for high school performance.

=== Honorary degrees ===
USNY can also issue honorary degrees; the honorary degrees that can be issued come from an established list contained in Rules of the Board of Regents ("Regents Rules"). USNY also has the power to directly issue (as opposed to through some other institution) diplomas, certificates, and degrees. Today, for a variety of reasons, USNY directly issues diplomas to individuals meeting graduation requirements at several postsecondary institutions in New York State.

== State University of New York ==
Not to be confused with USNY is the State University of New York (SUNY), which is one of New York State's systems of public higher education, the other being the City University of New York (CUNY). Like all colleges and universities in the state, the 64 SUNY and 25 CUNY campus units are all part of USNY. However, the power of SUNY and CUNY units to grant degrees exists by mandate of the State Legislature; a private college or university in New York State would be allowed to grant degrees by virtue of a charter granted by the USNY Board of Regents. No institution in New York State can call itself, per New York State law, a "college" or "university," or award academic degrees, without being chartered by NYSED and being a USNY member. Institutions in the state can, however, offer non-degree certificate programs without adhering to these requirements.
