= National Black United Front =

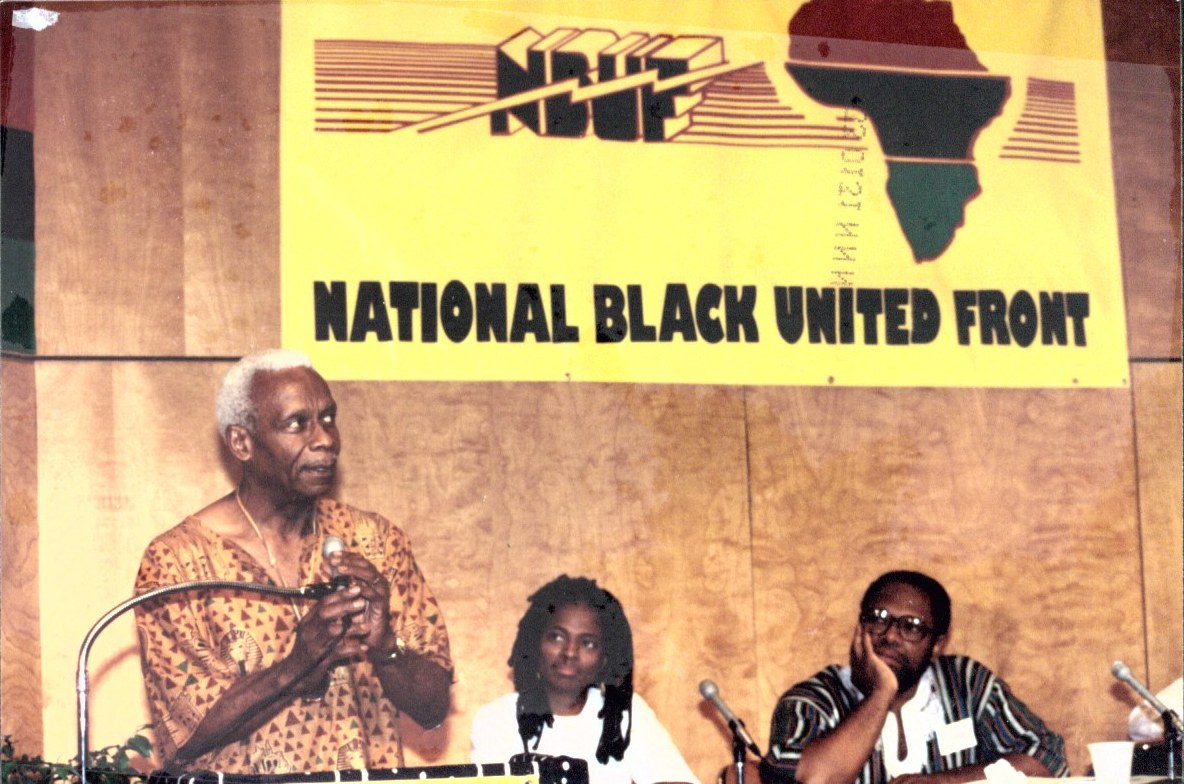
- National Black United Front, 1993
- Abbreviation: NBUF
- Formation: 1980; 46 years ago
- Founder: Rev. Herbert Daughtry
- Type: African-American organization

The National Black United Front (NBUF) is an African-American organization formed in the late 1970s in Brooklyn, New York. Its headquarters are in South Shore, Chicago, Illinois.

It has been described as Christian, Left-leaning, somewhat Black nationalist and working in the tradition of the Million Man March and Malcolm X. The organization held its 30th annual convention from July 16 to July 19, 2009 in Chicago, Illinois.

== Philosophy and mission statement ==
The National Black United Front (NBUF) was officially founded in 1980 in Brooklyn, New York, after being hindered by assassinations and FBI counterintelligence work of the 1970s. A politically radical, grass-roots organization supporting the Pan-African movement championed by Marcus Garvey, the NBUF focuses on the advancement of all people of African descent. They have been described as “comfortable and adamant in defining a racial history and racial solidarity,” and they focus on controversial issues and pressing inequalities. These issues include demanding reparations for ancestors of slaves, disaster relief, prison reform, advocating Afrikan-centered education, get out the vote campaigns, and a petition to the United Nations that the United States has and continues to commit genocide against African Americans.

== Community involvement and other activities ==
They have aided in criminal justice cases, including the release of exonerated death-row inmate Clarence Brandley and involvement in the Shaka Sankofa case, hold Sankofa Study Circles to teach black history, host various black artists through the Black Arts Movement, participate in the Feed the Hood Project, and are involved in the Haitian outreach program (Haitian Ministries formed by one of NBUF'S past National Secretaries and member of the Houston chapter). The NBUF also sponsors cultural programs, including the Frontlines Album Project, sponsorship of annual Kwanzaa Programs, and African Liberation Day activities. Internationally, the NBUF was involved with the Free South Africa Movement, supported Prime Minister Maurice Bishop of Grenada, and donated to victims of the mass slaughter in Rwanda.

The National Black United Front Human Rights and Genocide Campaign is a Petition/Declaration to the Office of the High Commissioner for Human Rights of the United Nations in Geneva, Switzerland. The Petition/Declaration of more than 200,000 signatures of African people who agree that the U.S. government has committed and continues to commit genocide against the African population in the United States has been a major focus of the Campaign. In the submission of the Petition/Declaration, they also submitted preliminary information in a 38 count indictment against the United States for a variety of Human Rights violations against African people in the country. The NBUF also recently become a certified organization with the National Black Federation of Charities, an arm of the National Black United Fund, Inc. and are now able to receive donations through payroll deduction from people in the federal workplace throughout the world.

== Controversy ==
Some controversy has surrounded the NBUF during its existence. Early in its formation, female activists involved with the organization, including Loretta Ross, Nkenge Touré, and Jamala Rogers, felt resistance in the form of sexism from other leaders within the organization. There was a difficult struggle to form a women's section, and the most blatant manifestation of sexism came in the resistance to sending a delegation from the NBUF to the 1985 Decade for Women Conference in Nairobi, Kenya. Those against sending a delegation argued the women were “abandoning the black struggle and blindly following the white feminist movement,” going so far as to boo the women at the NBUF conference that year. The NBUF sisters did end up attending the conference and made a significant contribution by networking with African women from all over the world and presenting a paper on “The Presence of African Women in America.” Jamala Rogers offered another example of sexism, stating that when the St. Louis branch of a different organization, the Organization for Black Struggle, merged with the NBUF St. Louis chapter, they eventually broke off from the NBUF due to issues of patriarchy and sectarianism. More recently, NBUF leader Dr. Charles Worrill has been criticized for his extreme political militancy and for continuing to support and work with the controversial Nation of Islam leader Louis Farrakhan, who is also known for extreme anti-Semitic remarks.

== Important People and Chapters ==
=== Notable people ===
Dr. Conrad Worrill: chairman of NBUF until 2009, educator, newspaper columnist, community organizer, and radio talk-show host, critic of racism and exponent of economic and political enfranchisement for Black people.

Rev. Jew Don Boney: Activist and politician, won City Council seat in Houston, Texas, with NBUF help Served on city council until 2001 and afterwards was appointed Associate Director of the Mickey Leland Center on World Hunger and Peace at Texas Southern University. There he administered the Center's widely acclaimed leadership development programs, including the Texas Legislative Internship, the Mickey Leland Congressional Internship and the Mickey Leland International Enhancement Program for study abroad opportunities.

Rev. Herbert Daughtry: "The People's Pastor," Founding chairman of NBUF. National Presiding Minister of The House of the Lord Churches (1958-2019), founder and president of the African People's Christian Organization
