= National Women's History Museum =

Non-profit organization in the USA

- Abbreviation: NWHM
- Formation: 1996
- Founder: Karen Staser
- Type: Non-profit
- Tax ID no.: 54-1801426
- Location: Washington, D.C.
- Board Chair: Susan Whiting
- President and CEO: Frédérique Irwin
- Website: www.womenshistory.org

The National Women's History Museum (NWHM) is a museum and an American history organization that "researches, collects and exhibits the contributions of women to the social, cultural, economic and political life of our nation in a context of world history." The NWHM was founded in 1996 by Karen Staser. It currently offers an online museum, educational programs, scholarship and research.

== History ==
The National Women's History Museum was founded in 1996 by Karen Staser. It currently curates in person and virtual exhibitions and provides resources for educators, students, and general audiences.

NWHM dedicated resources since its inception to raise support and lobby Congress to fund a women’s history museum in Washington, DC. Their efforts were realized in December, 2021, when Congress approved the creation of the American Women’s History Museum (AWHM) on the National Mall. Congress made the decision to create the AWHM under the auspices of the Smithsonian, with two members of the National Women’s History Museum serving on the Smithsonian’s AWHM Advisory Council.

In spring 2020, NWHM launched Women Writing History: A Coronavirus Journaling Project, an initiative "designed to ensure that women and girls’ unique voices and experiences are not left out of the telling of the COVID-19 story. Through this project, women and girls of all ages can participate through the simple act of recording their daily thoughts and experiences during this time in order to document the impact of the coronavirus pandemic on women’s lives." NWHM received more than 500 submissions, both digital and print, and published them in a searchable microsite on October 21, 2021. On April 21, 2022, the New York Times published excerpts from NWHM's journaling project: "The result, after almost two years and 500 entries, is a rich Gestaltian time capsule of the pandemic, parts of it housed on the museum’s website or archived in the cabinets of its office in Alexandria, Va. There are handwritten and typed-up poems; voice notes between friends who live far apart; an interpretive dance recorded in a solitary bedroom; even a hand-stitched quilt. These physical and digital artifacts brim with emotion and reflection."

In late 2020, Congress passed legislation (P.L. 116-330, signed into law on January 13, 2021) directing the U.S. Mint to consult with the National Women's History Museum, as well as the Smithsonian Institution American Women’s History Initiative and the Bipartisan Women’s Caucus, to identify prominent American women to honor on a series of quarter dollars over four years beginning in January 2022. The women are featured on circulating and numismatic American Women Quarters™ Program coins. The public was invited to submit recommendations through a web portal hosted by NWHM, and more than 11,000 recommendations were submitted for consideration.

In 2022, the National Women's History Museum announced a partnership with DC Public Library. In spring 2023, the NWHM opened their first full in-person exhibition at the Martin Luther King Jr. Memorial Library in Washington, D.C. The exhibit traces Black feminism in Washington, DC from the turn of the 20th century through the civil rights and Black Power movements to today. The exhibit is curated by historians Sherie M. Randolph and Kendra T. Field and focuses on the stories and voices of Black feminist organizers and theorists, including Anna Julia Cooper, Eleanor Holmes Norton, Mary Treadwell, and Nkenge Touré. The exhibit is located on the MLK Library's first floor and will be on display through September 2024.

In October 2022, Glass Ceiling Breaker, was installed at the Martin Luther King Jr. Memorial Library as part of the partnership with DC Public Library. Glass Ceiling Breaker was commissioned by NWHM, Chief and BBH USA, with production assistance from M ss ng P eces, to "commemorate the iconic moment when Vice President Kamala Harris broke the glass ceiling by becoming the first woman, first Black person, and first Indian-American elected vice president of the United States. The installation was displayed in Washington, DC in February 2021 at the Lincoln Memorial. The project recently won three golds at the inaugural 2022 Anthem Awards, as well as a silver in Corporate Purpose & Social Responsibility (Outdoor) at the Cannes Lions International Festival of Creativity Awards 2021."

On March 17, 2026, NWHM announced that Meryl Streep had made "a significant seven-figure gift to advance the future of women's history." In recognition of her contribution the NWHM will establish the Meryl Streep Educator Award "honoring an exceptional educator each year who advances the teaching of women's history and expands access to these vital narratives in classrooms and communities nationwide." The first award will be celebrated at its Women Making History Awards Gala in November 2026.
