= J. Don Boney =

Jew Don Boney (March 28, 1928 – August 1979) was a Texas educator who served as an administrator in the Houston Independent School District. He assisted in the planning and establishment of two colleges in Houston, and was president of the University of Houston–Downtown College.

== Biography ==
Dr. Boney was a native of Calvert, Texas, which is located between Dallas, Houston, and Austin. It is about 30 miles north of Bryan-College Station and 90 miles northeast of Austin. He was the son of David Boney and the grandson of Wright Boney—the first person to own an automobile in a county near Calvert.

J. Don Boney attended Prairie View A&M College of Texas, from where he earned a Bachelor of Science degree in 1948. He earned his master's degree in Education, in 1957, and Ed.D, in 1964, from The University of Texas.

Dr. Boney was married to Clara Payne Boney. His son, the Rev. Jew Don Boney, is a well-known former councilmember and civil-rights activist in the city of Houston.

== Career ==
Dr. Boney was an associate professor of educational psychology at the University of Houston (UH) from 1967 to 1969, and the UH's College of Education associate dean of graduate studies from 1970 to 1971.

He took the position of acting General Superintendent of the Houston Independent School District, in 1971, and was the Houston Independent School District's chief instructional officer in 1971-72. He assumed the presidency at the fledgling Houston Community College System in 1973, and he held that position until 1975. In 1974, the System had 16,495 students enrolled.

Dr. Boney had been an associate professor of education at the University of Illinois. He served on Lieutenant Governor Bill Hobby’s Special Committee on Human Services Delivery.

At the time of his death in 1979, he was on the Board of Directors of Entex, Inc., Riverside National Bank, the Better Business Bureau for Metropolitan Houston, Inc., and other corporate boards. Dr. Boney also held the Chancellorship of the University of Houston–Downtown College from 1975 to the time of his death.

== Scholarly writings ==
- "Some Dynamics of Disadvantaged Students in Learning Situations", J. Don Boney, The Journal of Negro Education, Vol. 36, No. 3, The Higher Education of Negro Americans: Prospects and Programs (Summer, 1967), pp. 315–19.
- "An Analysis of the Participation of Racially Integrated Guidance Groups of Culturally Different Children in Elementary School", J. Don Boney, Charleta Dunn, Thomas Bass, The Journal of Negro Education, Vol. 40, No. 4 (Autumn, 1971), pp. 390–93.

Academic offices
Preceded by William I. Dykes	President of the University of Houston–Downtown College; 1975–1979	Succeeded by Alexander F. Schilt
