= Terry Grier (superintendent) =

American school superintendent

Superintendent of the Houston Independent School District
- In office September 1, 2009 – March 1, 2016
- Preceded by: Abelardo Saavedra
- Succeeded by: Richard Carranza

Superintendent of the San Diego Unified School District
- In office March 2008 – August 2009

Superintendent of the Guilford County Schools
- In office 2000–2008

Terry B. Grier is a former superintendent of the Houston Independent School District (HISD), the largest school district in the State of Texas, as well as San Diego Unified School District (SDUSD) and Guilford County Schools.

== Early life ==
He was born into a low income family, in which members were poorly educated, in Fairmont, North Carolina. He was the first member of his family to attend university and received his PhD from Vanderbilt University. Mimi Swartz of Texas Monthly stated that his PhD "was no doubt a source of pride, an indication of just how far he had come."

== Career ==
In a twenty-five year span, Grier worked for eight different school districts. He initially served as an athletic coach and later as a teacher. He first became a school superintendent at age 34.

Grier served as the superintendent of Guilford County Schools for fewer than eight years. Swartz stated that this length of service was "a lifetime in the annals of superintendents" in the U.S.

He served as the superintendent of San Diego USD for one and one half years; Swartz described his SDUSD term as "combative". Once the SDUSD board ended supporting Grier, he looked for other employment opportunities.

=== Houston Independent School District ===
Grier, who arrived in Houston in August 2009, began his term at HISD after all members of that district's board voted to hire him in September 2009. Grier's wife saw promotional material for HISD and suggested going to that district, which had two times the budget and overall size of the previous one. HISD board members wanted to improve the district's perceived standing - among the best of urban districts but still below average overall - without installing too much radical change, and they felt that a stronger personality was needed to check Gayle Fallon, the head of the Houston Federation of Teachers.

While the previous superintendent, Abelardo Saavedra, decentralized management at HISD, Grier re-centralized it. Grier established the Apollo 20 program, using a more rigorous curriculum at schools known for having low test scores. Swartz characterized Apollo 20 as being similar to that of KIPP, a charter school network. Swartz explained that rising superintendents tend to enact innovative programs as those who are perceived as doing too little are often fired, and that for Grier Apollo 20 serves as his "novel program that attracts attention and helps them advance when the end comes, as it inevitably does." Grier also commissioned a study that concluded that magnet school programs - previously seen as being highly successful in HISD - should be severely curtailed.

Swartz stated that initially Grier, who was perceived as being "brusque", was seen as a potential reformer who could make necessary changes and that in July 2010 Grier "was still a pretty popular guy". The Houston Chronicle initially ran content supportive of Grier. However Swartz stated that by 2011 several vocal groups made heated rhetoric against Grier. She explained there were members of the public who believed Grier was too ambitious and trying to change too many things at once, contrasting him with Saavedra, who she stated was perceived as having accomplished relatively little. A May 2011 editorial by a teacher leaving HISD in the Chronicle was the first article in that paper that was critical of Grier. Swartz described Grier as "smart and articulate and charming" but that since people often have different facets of their personalities, it means other characterizations may also be accurate. The business networks of Houston and the HISD board were in favor of Grier.

Grier resigned effective March 1, 2016; his work was to end on February 29. His contract was originally scheduled to end in June of that year. Laura Isensee of Houston Public Media stated that the length of Grier's term outlasted the three-year average for a superintendent of a large school district.

Educational offices
Preceded by Abelardo Saavedra	Houston Independent School District superintendent 2009-2016	Succeeded by Richard Carranza
Preceded by ????	San Diego Unified School District superintendent ????	Succeeded by ?????
