= Abelardo Saavedra =

Abelardo "Abe" Saavedra

Superintendent of the Houston Independent School District
- In office 2004–2010
- Preceded by: Kaye Stripling (interim)
- Succeeded by: Terry Grier

Superintendent of the Corpus Christi Independent School District
- In office 1993–2000

Superintendent of the South San Antonio Independent School District
- In office 2014–2018

Personal details
- Spouse: Myrna
- Children: 2
- Education: Texas A&M University–Kingsville (BA, MA); University of Michigan (PhD)
- Known for: Houston Independent School District superintendent

Abelardo Saavedra is a former school district superintendent. He previously served as the superintendent of the Houston Independent School District (HISD) headquartered in Houston, Texas, United States. In addition he formerly served as superintendent of the Corpus Christi Independent School District (CCISD) and the South San Antonio Independent School District (SSAISD).

== Education ==
Saavedra received a bachelor's degree in Science in 1972 and a master's degree in Science in 1974; he earned both degrees at Texas A&I University (now Texas A&M University–Kingsville) in Kingsville. In 1976 he received his Doctor of Philosophy degree in school administration at the University of Michigan in 1976.

== Career ==
Saavedra became the superintendent of Corpus Christi Independent School District and he held that position from 1993 to 2000 for a total of seven years. At one point authorities filed charged against Saavedra, accusing him of tampering with government documentation and theft by a public servant; the authorities accused him of labeling US$344 dollars' worth of alcohol purchases with a CCISD-issued American Express credit card as a purchase of "meals." CCISD documents stated that Saavedra had reimbursed the district with $186.43. Some trustees said that they were with Saavedra when he purchased the alcohol. Three trustees said that they lost confidence in Saavedra, while other trustees said that they did not lose confidence. By April 4, 2000 the school board did not vote on whether to fire Saavedra. On May 18, 2000, a jury acquitted Saavedra and he paid a $100 fine.

Saavedra joined Houston ISD and became the Superintendent of the East District in February 2001. In August 2002 he became the executive deputy superintendent for School Support Services. When Houston Independent School District interim superintendent Kaye Stripling retired in August 2004 Saavedra took her position. The district officially made him superintendent on December 9, 2004. Saavedra became the first Hispanic American superintendent of Houston ISD.

In HISD Saavedra decentralized the management of schools. Mimi Swartz of Texas Monthly stated that Saavedra "was nothing if not cautious and reserved and accomplished little more than serving as Houston’s first Hispanic superintendent." She added that "Saavedra alienated a great many people because, it was said, he did too little". Citing the political and interest group pressures on school superintendents, Swartz added "To be fair, Saavedra may not have been able to do much more."

As of July 2008 his annual salary was $442,556. He announced his term would end in Spring 2010.

He became the superintendent of South San Antonio ISD in 2014. He announced that he was leaving the position at the end of his contract on March 19, 2019. He ultimately resigned before the end of his contract, with his last day being October 12, 2018. Saavedra's decision to resign, as well as the district's agreement on Saavedra leaving, was approved by the SSAISD board on a 6-1 basis that day. The then-Palacios Independent School District (PISD) superintendent, Alexandro Flores, replaced him.

In October 2018 the HISD board chose to appoint Saavedra as the interim HISD superintendent, but the board later reversed its decision.

== See also ==
Educational offices
Preceded by ???	South San Antonio Independent School District superintendent 2014-2018	Succeeded by Alexandro Flores
Preceded by Kaye Stripling (interim)	Houston Independent School District superintendent 2004-2010	Succeeded by Terry Grier
Preceded by ????	Corpus Christi Independent School District superintendent 1993-2000	Succeeded by ?????
