= Houston Independent School District =

Public school system in Texas

- The seal of the school district.

Address
- 4400 West 18th Street Houston, Texas, 77092; United States
- Coordinates: 29.802779°N 95.454267°W

District information
- Type: Public
- Motto: Building Houston's Future, Right Now
- Grades: Pre-K3–12
- Established: 1924; 102 years ago
- President: Audrey Momanaee
- Superintendent: Mike Miles
- Schools: 274
- NCES District ID: 4823640

Students and staff
- Students: 184,109 (2023–2024)
- Teachers: 11,785.74 (on an FTE basis) (2023–2024)
- Staff: 14,279.46 (on an FTE basis) (2023–2024)
- Student–teacher ratio: 15.62 (2023–2024)

Other information
- Website: www.houstonisd.org

The Houston Independent School District (HISD) is the largest public school system in Texas, and the eighth-largest in the United States. Houston ISD serves as a community school district for most of the city of Houston and several nearby and insular municipalities in addition to some unincorporated areas. Like most districts in Texas, it is independent of the city of Houston and all other municipal and county jurisdictions. The district has its headquarters in the Hattie Mae White Educational Support Center in Houston.

In 2016, the school district was rated "met standards" by the Texas Education Agency.

== History ==
=== 20th century ===
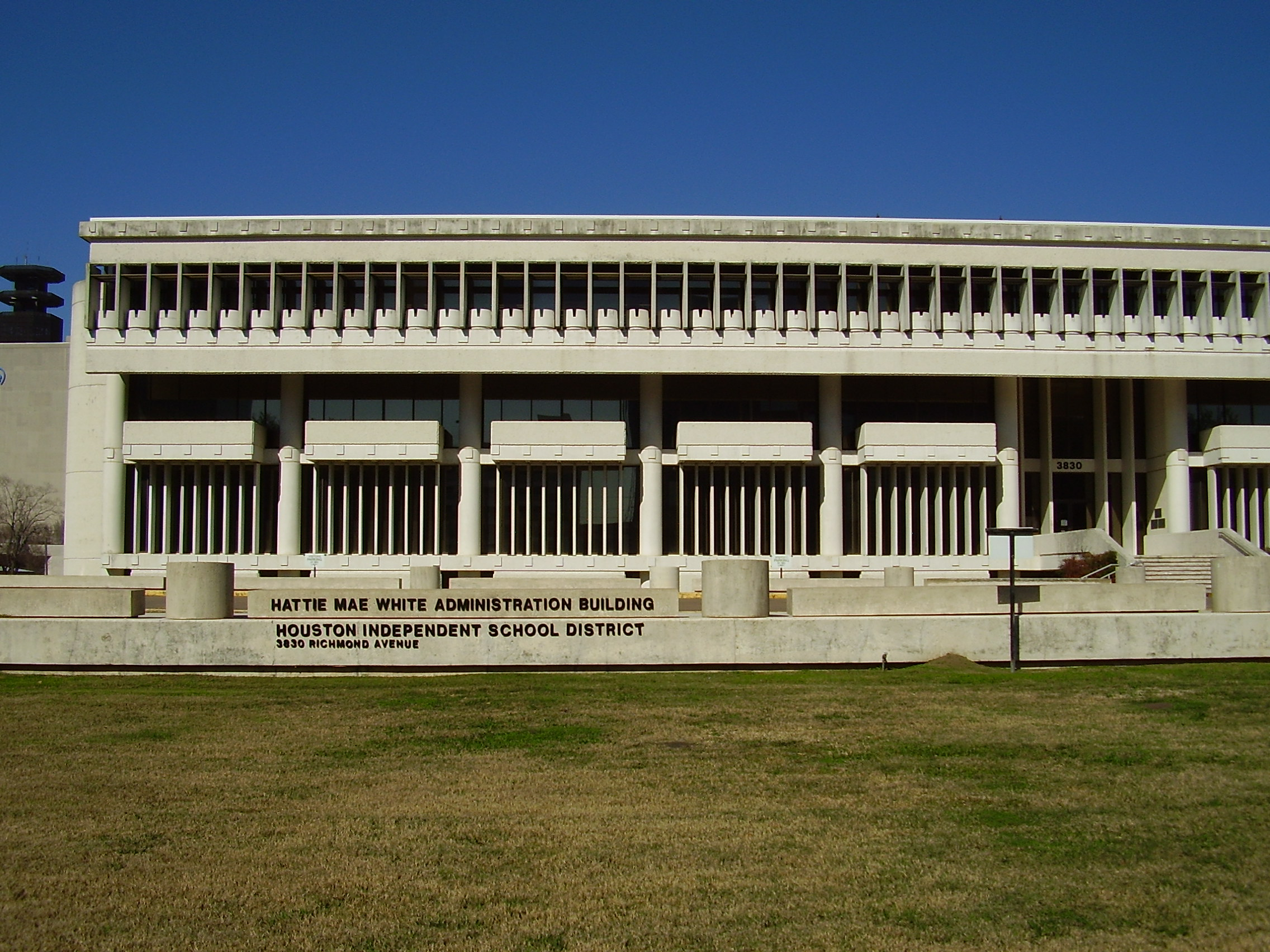
The first Hattie Mae White Administration Building. It has been sold and demolished. The building was replaced by the Hattie Mae White Educational Support Center.

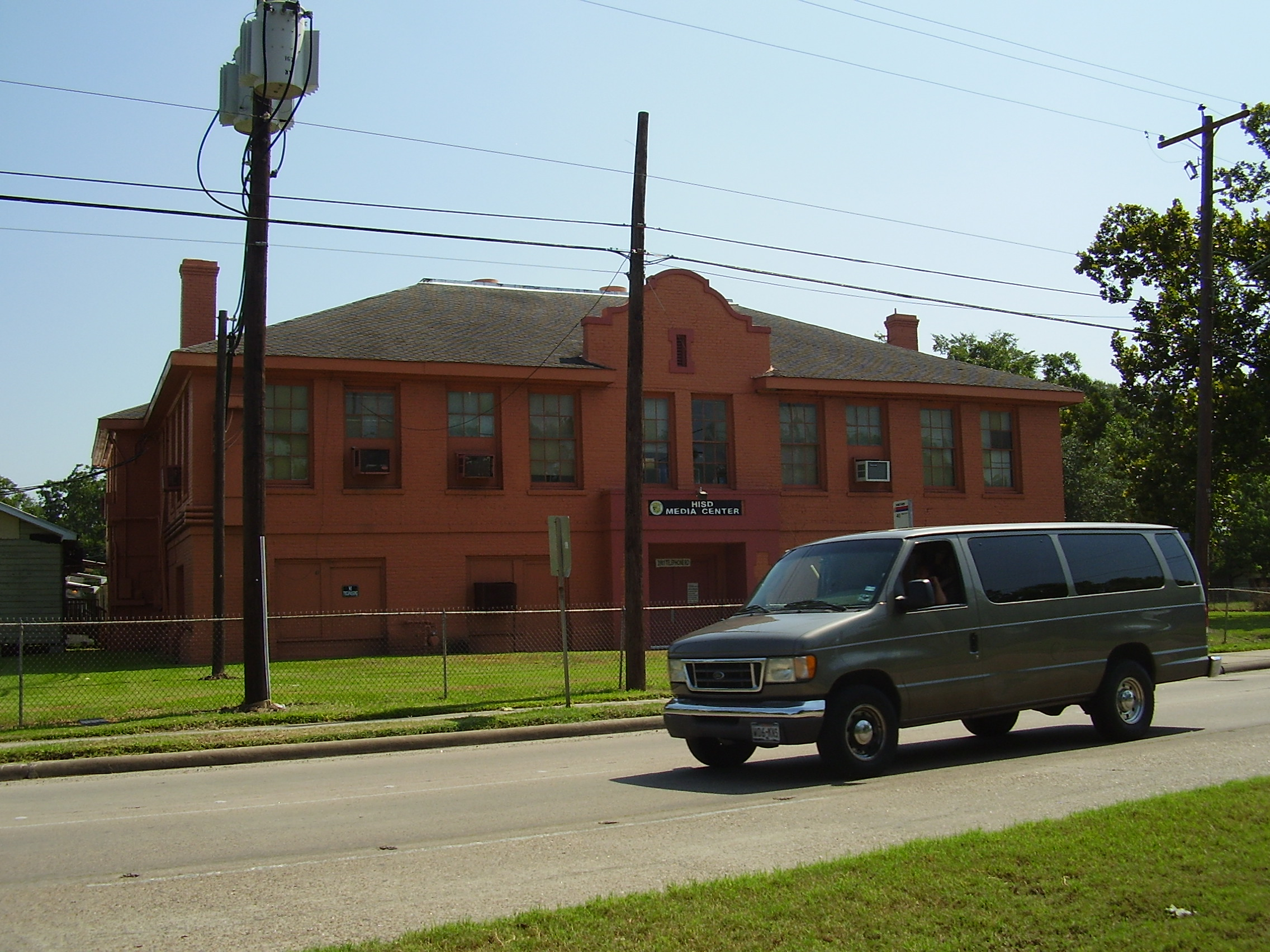
Media Center

The Brunner Independent School District merged into Houston schools in 1913-1914.

Houston ISD was established in 1923 after the Texas Legislature voted to separate the city's schools from the municipal government.

In the 1920s, at the time Edison Oberholtzer was superintendent, Hubert L. Mills, the business manager of the district, had immense political power in HISD. He had been in the employment of the district over one decade before Oberholtzer started. By the 1930s, the two men were in a power struggle.

The number of students in public schools in Houston increased from 5,500 in 1888 to over 8,850 in 1927.

In the 1920s, the school district expanded its infrastructure to accommodate a growing number of black students. There were 8,293 students in Houston's schools for black students in the 1924-1925 school year. In 1927, Houston ISD annexed the Harrisburg School District's colored school. The district also built new schools such as the former Jack Yates High School (later Ryan Middle School) and Wheatley High School. The capacity of Houston's secondary schools for black children increased by three times from 1924 to 1929. The original secondary school for blacks was named Colored High School (now Booker T. Washington High School). At the time, the district's three secondary schools for black students had junior high and senior high levels. There were 12,217 students in the black schools in the 1929-1930 school year. William Henry Kellar, author of Make Haste Slowly: Moderates, Conservatives, and School Desegregation in Houston, wrote that conditions in black schools "improved dramatically" in the 1920s.

Houston ISD absorbed portions of the White Oak Independent School District in 1937 and portions of the Addicks Independent School District after its dissolution.

In the fall of 1960, 12 black students were admitted to HISD schools previously reserved for whites. The racial integration efforts in HISD, beginning in 1960, were characterized by a lack of violence and turmoil as business leaders sought not to cause disruption. Prior to 1960 HISD was the largest racially segregated school system in the United States.

In the mid-1960s Gertrude Barnstone and Black board member Hattie Mae White, the sole politically liberal members of the school board, often clashed with more conservative board members in meetings held on Monday nights; the two women made efforts to racially integrate the schools. During the 1960s, HISD's school board instituted a phase-in with each subsequent grade being integrated. Local African-American leaders believed the pace was too slow, and William Lawson, a youth minister, asked Wheatley students to boycott school. Five days afterwards 10% of Wheatley students attended classes. In 1970 a federal judge asked the district to speed the integration process.

Simultaneously Mexican Americans were being discriminated against when they were being labeled as whites and being put with only African Americans as part of HISD's desegregation / integration plan. This kept both Mexican Americans and African Americans away from Anglos while satisfying integration requirements set forth by the 1954 Brown v. Board of Education court case decision. A number of Mexican Americans took their children out of the public schools and put them in "huelga," or protest schools. On August 31, 1970, and organized by the Mexican-American Education Council (MAEC), they began three weeks of boycotts, protests, and picketing. This action lasted approximately three weeks, during which up to 75% of the student bodies of some high schools participated in the boycotts. During the protests MAEC demanded twenty issues to be resolved and HISD began rezoning school areas within its jurisdiction in response. However, this rezoning encouraged "white flight" since minorities were now entering "white schools" in large numbers. At first the district used forced busing, but later switched to a voluntary magnet school program in order to discourage "white flight".

The district eventually integrated races in a semi-peaceful manner. River Oaks Elementary School became the first school to implement the HISD's Vanguard Program in the fall of 1972, with a program for 4th-6th graders. This program was initially named the Elementary School For The Gifted. The Vanguard Program name was adopted a year later. A desegregation busing plan, protested by Anglo White westside neighborhoods not wanting their children bused to predominately black schools, was rejected by the court system but white flight began by the 1970s.

Circa 1972, a group of citizens in western Houston tried to form Westheimer Independent School District out of a portion of Houston ISD. It would have removed 23 square miles (60 km^{2}) from the HISD territory. At the time 90% of the students in the area were white. The United States Court of Appeals for the Fifth Circuit rejected the appeals after formation of the district was denied.

HISD once served the Harris County portion of Stafford, until the Stafford Municipal School District was established in 1982 to serve the entire city of Stafford. Most of Stafford was in Fort Bend ISD, with a small amount in Houston ISD.

In 1987 Olivia Munoz, the district's foreign language director, said that an increase in interest in foreign languages prompted the district to add foreign languages to four high schools.

In 1992, the district, under superintendent Frank Petruzielo, massively rezoned Houston schools, moving students from overcrowded ones to underutilized ones. Donald R. McAdams, a former HISD school board member and author of Fighting to Save Our Urban Schools-- and Winning!: Lessons from Houston, wrote that Petruzielo accomplished this goal with a minimum of press coverage and controversy by using a participative process that minimized conflict between various Houston neighborhoods. McAdams credits the move with being the catalyst for the 1995 establishment of 11 geographic districts patterned around high school feeder patterns.

In 1994, after superintendent Petruzielo left the district, the school district voted 6-1 to make Yvonne Gonzalez the interim superintendent; the school district board members described this as a "symbolic" motion as Gonzalez was the first Hispanic interim superintendent. Gonzalez served until Rod Paige became the superintendent.

In 1995 HISD had a performance audit; As of 2019 this was the last such audit done.

In the 1990s, after voters rejected a $390 million bond package, Paige contracted with The Varnett School, River Oaks Academy, and Wonderland School to house 250 students who could not be placed in HISD schools. The schools were paid $3,565 per student. This was 10% lower than the district's own per pupil cost.

=== 21st century ===
==== 2000s ====
A 2003 The New York Times report which asserted that HISD did not report school violence to the police created controversy in the community as teachers, students, and parents expressed concern about the district's downplaying of campus violence. HISD officials held a news conference after the publication of the story. During the conference, HISD asserted that The New York Times published the story in an attempt to discredit the Bush administration's new accountability standards for school districts nationwide, which were partly modeled after HISD's system.

In 2005, HISD enrolled evacuees from the areas affected by Hurricane Katrina who were residing in Houston. The Houston Astrodome, the shelter used for hurricane evacuees, is located within the HISD boundaries. A number of Katrina evacuees stayed for the long term within the Houston ISD boundaries. Walnut Bend Elementary School's enrollment increased from around 600 to around 800 with the addition of 184 evacuees; Walnut Bend, out of all of the Houston-area elementary schools, took the most Katrina victims. Nearby Paul Revere Middle School, located in the Westchase district, gained 137 Katrina victims. Revere, out of all of the Houston-area middle schools, has taken in the most Katrina victims. Houston ISD's "West Region," which includes Walnut Bend and Revere, had about one-fifth of Houston ISD's schools but contained more than half of the 5,500 Katrina evacuees in Houston schools. At the start of the 2006-2007 school year, around 2,900 Hurricane Katrina evacuees were still enrolled in Houston ISD schools. Around 700 of them were held back due to poor academic performance. 41% of evacuee 10th graders and 52% of evacuee juniors were held back. According to the October 2006 "For Your Information" newsletter, the eleven HISD schools which took the largest number of Katrina evacuees were:

- Elementary schools: Bonham, Foerster, McNamara, Walnut Bend
- Middle schools: Fondren, Revere, Sharpstown Middle
- High schools: Lee, Sharpstown High, Westbury, Westside

A University of Houston study concluded that the presence of Katrina evacuees did not impact the test score grades of native Houstonian students.

In 2007 the Federal Bureau of Investigation, the Federal Communications Commission, and the United States Department of Justice began an investigation probing business relationships between Micro Systems Enterprises, a vendor, and HISD. Frankie Wong, former president of Micro Systems, and two Dallas Independent School District administrators received criminal charges.

As of 2007 several existing HISD schools were converting to K-8 school setups while other new K-8 schools were opening. Prior to the bond election in November 2007, the district abandoned a proposal to convert several schools into K-8 campuses due to African American neighborhoods communities resisting proposed school consolidations.

==== 2010s ====
In 2011 the Texas Education Agency ordered the North Forest Independent School District (NFISD) to close, pending approval from the U.S. Justice Department. NFISD would be merged into HISD.

On June 13, 2013, the HISD board voted unanimously to absorb the North Forest Independent School District (NFISD).

HISD won the Broad Prize in 2013.

On January 14, 2016, the HISD board voted 5-4 to rename four campuses named after Robert E. Lee or others linked to the Confederacy.

In October 2018 the HISD board chose to appoint Saavedra as the interim HISD superintendent, but the board later reversed its decision. The board members who did not favor bringing in Saavedra were not aware of this until a board member who did support this announced the decision at an official board meeting. The reversal meant that Grenita Latham remained as the interim superintendent.

By 2019 the Texas Education Agency (TEA) had opened an investigation against the school board and ordered a halt to any efforts to recruit a permanent superintendent. By August 2019 the TEA wrote a preliminary report recommending that the HISD school board be dissolved, with a state-appointed board of managers and conservator replacing it, and to reduce the accreditation of HISD. The report alleges wrongdoing of various board members, including violations of the Texas Open Meetings Act. The TEA initially had suggested a board takeover due to poor performance at some schools, but the alleged violation of the open meetings act when several board members attempted to re-hire Saavedra, without the knowledge of the remaining board members, became the reason to seek dismissal of the board. In 2019 HISD received a grade of 88 - "B" - from the TEA, while in 2018 it had a grade of 84. In 2019 271 HISD schools were counted in TEA accountability ratings. 250 schools passed, while 21 (7.5% of schools) did not.

==== 2020s ====
In 2020 the HISD board voted 6-3 against naming Lathan as permanent superintendent.

Millard House became the new superintendent on July 1, 2021. All board members voted to approve him and he was the only finalist for the position. He was from the Clarksville-Montgomery County School System.

During the COVID-19 pandemic in Texas House agreed to institute a mask mandate effective fall 2021 despite Governor of Texas Greg Abbott banning school districts from having mask mandates. Additionally the HISD board of education voted to approve the mask mandate. The vote was eight in favor and none voting against.

In 2023 the Texas Education Agency announced that it will remove the superintendent and the board of trustees, and therefore begin to directly control HISD. The Houston Independent School District takeover formally began on June 1, 2023 with the appointment of a new superintendent and board of managers. Millard House II was replaced as HISD superintendent by Mike Miles (school superintendent) as part of the planned takeover.

== Bilingual education, magnet, and vanguard schools ==
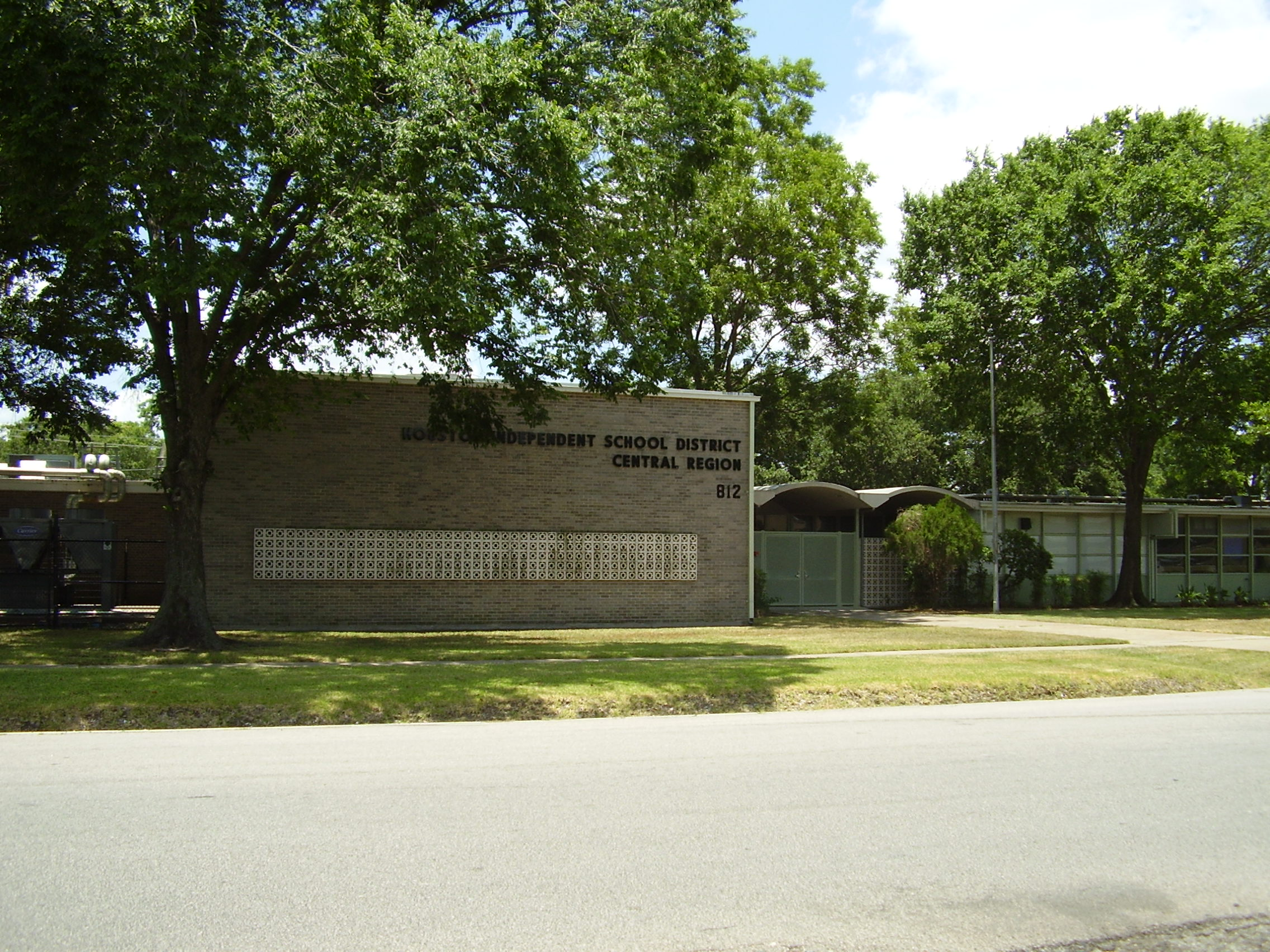
The at-the-time Central Region Office, which later held the Arabic Language Magnet School

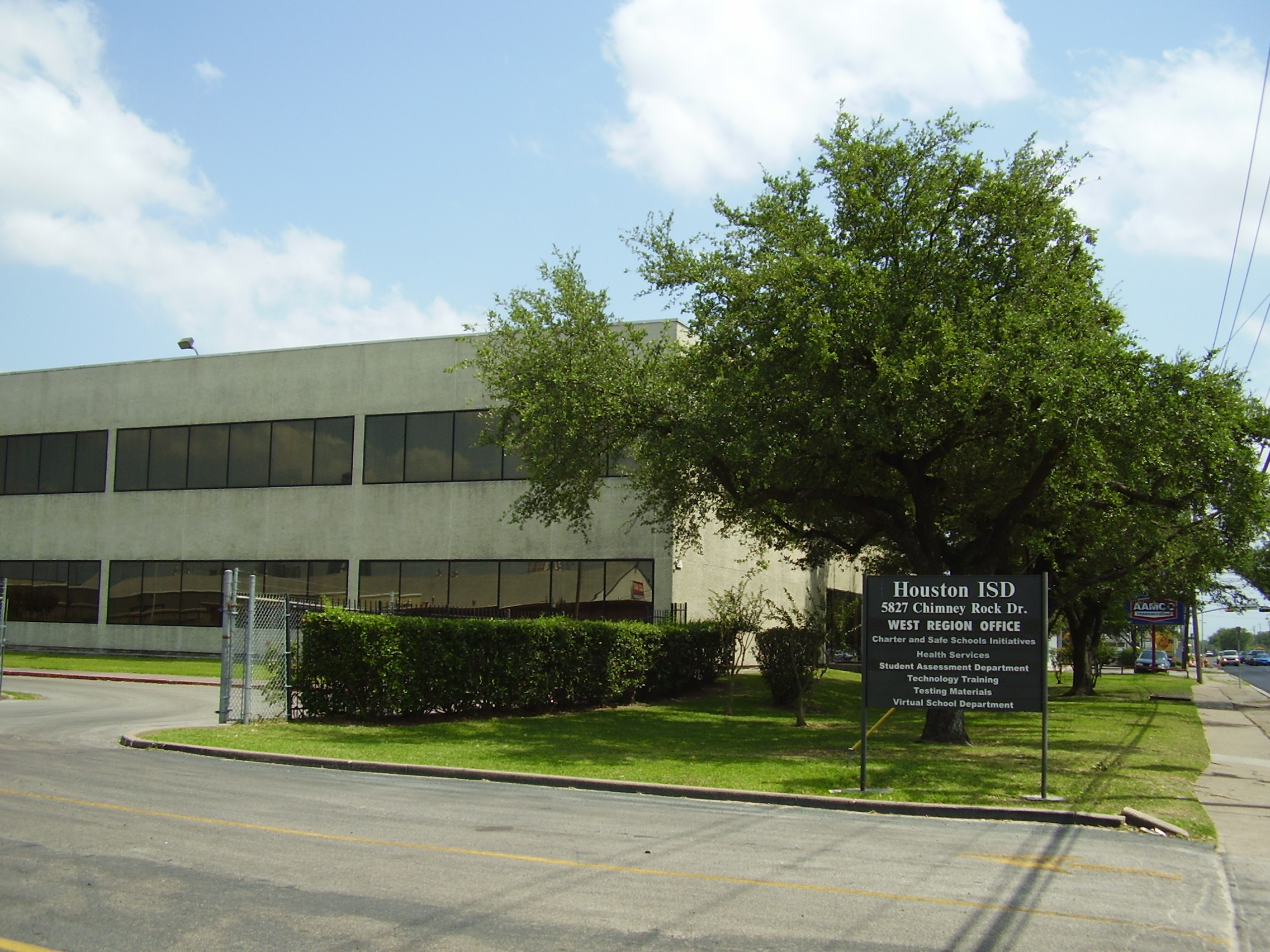
The at-the-time West Region Office, currently the Technology Information Systems building

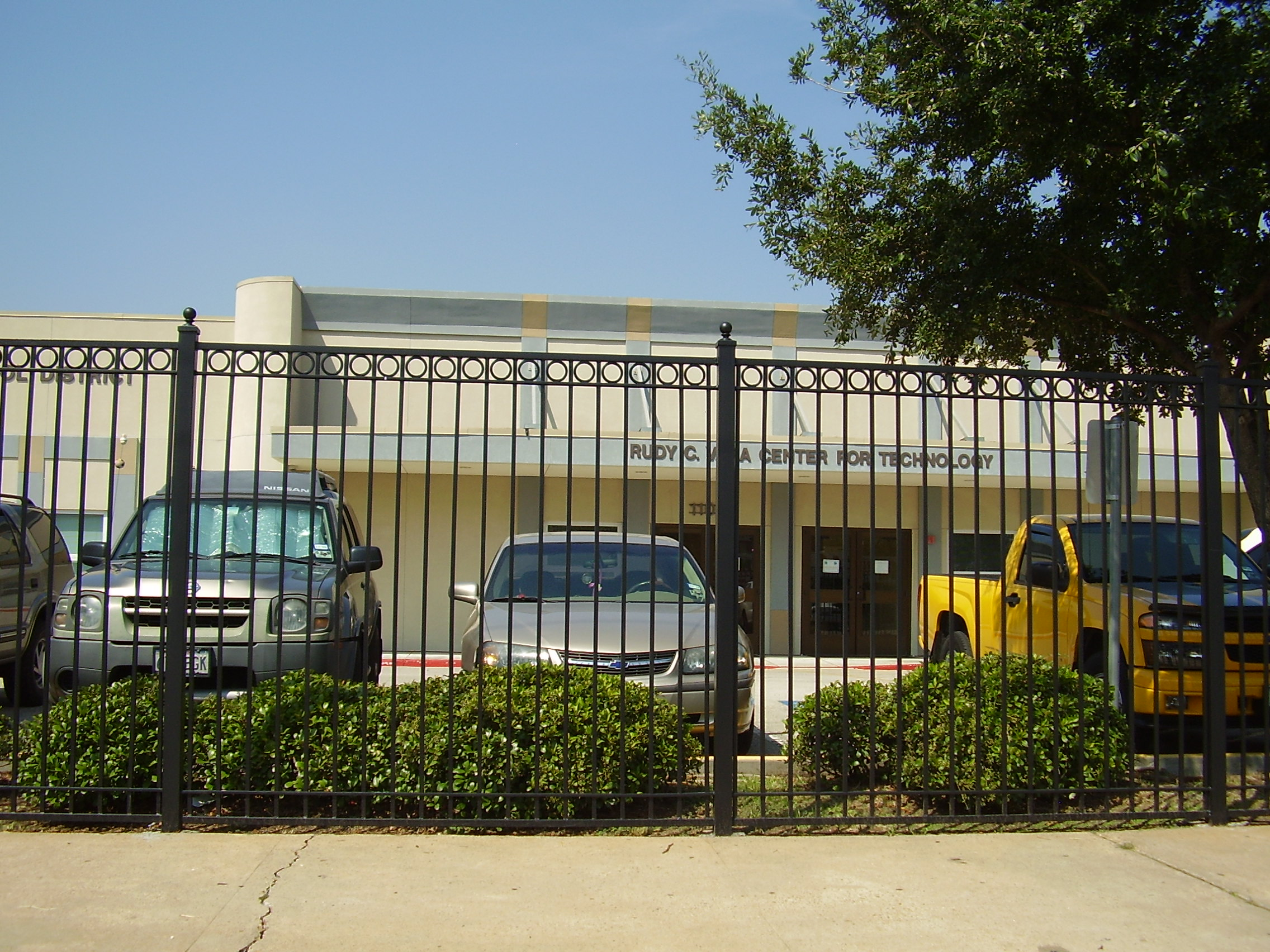
Rudy C. Vara Center for Technology

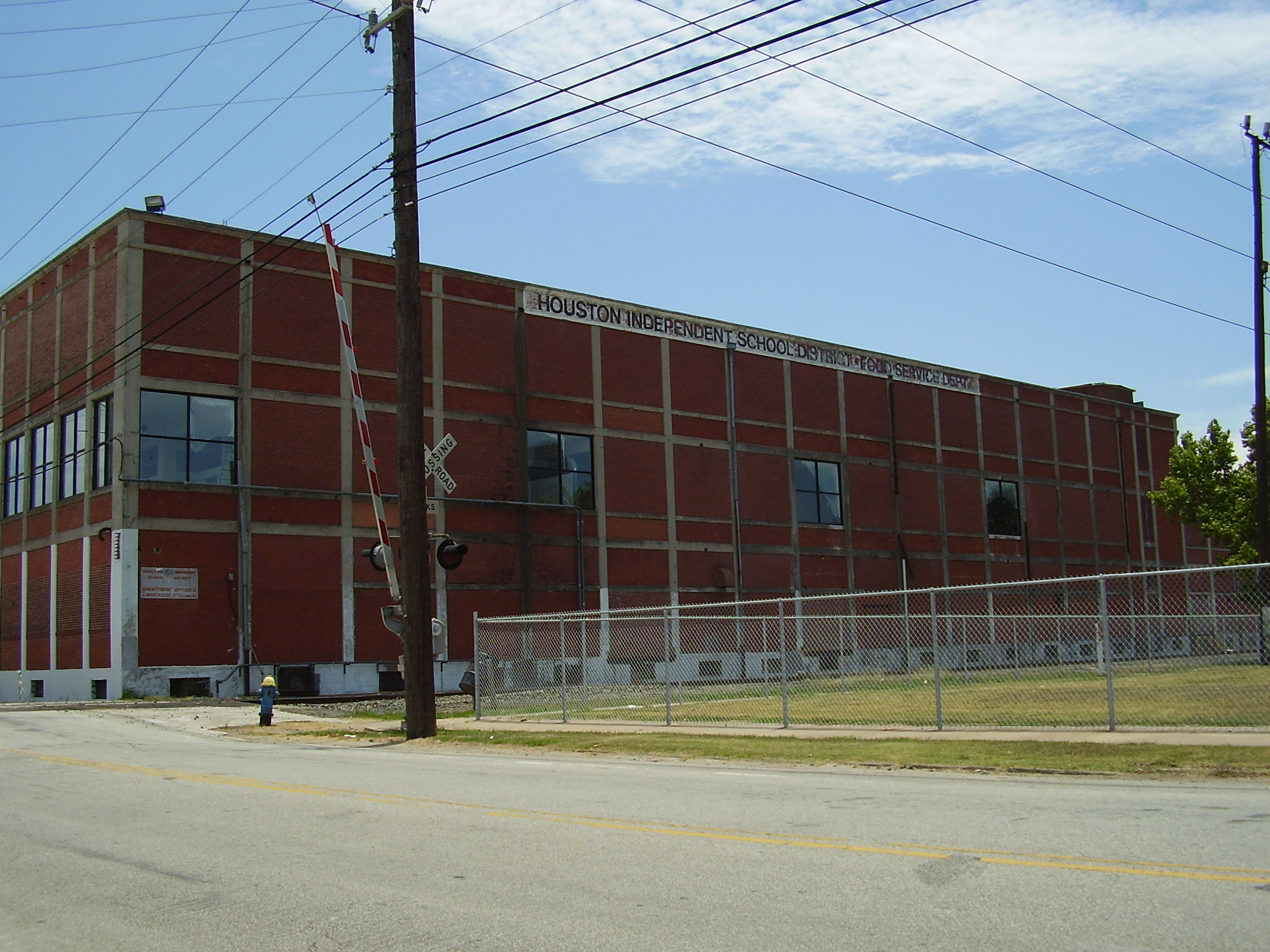
Former Food Service Department Building (now Saint Arnold Brewing Company plant)

HISD focuses on bilingual education of its predominantly Hispanic student body, including recruiting about 330 teachers from Mexico, Spain, Central and South America, Puerto Rico, China, and the Philippines from 1998 to 2007. Bilingual educational services, as of 2014, are available for Spanish, Arabic, Vietnamese, Mandarin Chinese, Nepali, Urdu, and Swahili speakers. According to Texas Administrative Code BB § 89.1205 a language is eligible to have a bilingual program if 20 or more students are present in a school district who speak that language as their home language.

Houston ISD offers three specialized programs, magnet programs, vanguard programs, and neighborhood vanguard programs. Each magnet program has a special focus and draws students throughout HISD. Each vanguard program is a gifted and talented program for students throughout HISD. A neighborhood vanguard program is a program designed for gifted and talented children zoned to a particular school. As of 2011, its 113 programs served almost 20% of the HISD student population.

HISD, which officially first opened its magnet system in 1975, started them as a way to voluntarily racially integrate schools. The High School for Performing and Visual Arts (HSPVA) was technically the first magnet school in Houston; this status was mistakenly attributed to River Oaks Elementary School. In 1984 the district had 75 magnet programs. By the mid-1990s multiple magnet schools no longer held the goal of integration and instead focused on improving educational quality of schools. As of 2011 magnet schools continued to be popular among HISD constituents.

HISD's magnet (Performing Arts, Science, Health Professions, Law Enforcement, etc.) high schools are considered a model for other urban school districts as a way to provide a high quality education and keep top performing students in the inner city from fleeing to private schools or exurban school districts. Magnet schools are popular with parents and students that wish to escape low-performing schools and school violence. The members of the administration of schools losing students to higher-performing campuses, such as Bill Miller of Yates High School, complained about the effects.

There are 55 elementary magnet schools, 30 magnet middle schools, and 27 magnet high schools. Some magnet schools are mixed comprehensive and magnet programs, while others are solidly magnet and do not admit any "neighborhood" students.

In April 1997 a lawsuit against HISD seeking to end race-based admissions to magnet schools was filed on behalf of two white applicants to Lanier Middle School who were denied admission because the quota for White students was filled. The lawsuit was funded by the group "Campaign for a Color-Blind America". That year, as a result of this lawsuit, HISD removed the ethnic guidelines to Vanguard enrollment.

== Student body ==
For the 2017-2018 school year the district reported a total enrollment of 214,175

- 61.84% were Hispanic American/Hispanic
- 24.02% were African American/Black
- 8.7% were White American/White
- 4.05% were Asian American/Asian
- 74.93% were economically disadvantaged

As of 2015, 7% of black students, 13% of Hispanic students, 36% of white students, and 43% of Asian students in HISD were labeled as gifted and talented. Students from wealthy families were twice as likely to be labeled as gifted and talented compared to students from economic disadvantaged backgrounds. HISD has been implementing multiple strategies to ensure there is more equity in its gifted and talented program.

As of the 2014-2015 school year, over 59,700 HISD students reported the language spoken at home by their families as Spanish. Over 925 reported their home language as Arabic and over 445 reported their home language as Vietnamese. As of 2015 other common languages were Mandarin Chinese, Nepali, and Urdu. As of 2014 the most common native languages for limited English and/or English learner students were Spanish (58,365 students, or 92% of ELL students), Arabic (855 or 1.3%), Vietnamese (437 or 0.7%), Mandarin Chinese (319 or 0.5%), Nepali (295, 0.5%), Swahili (250 or 0.4%), French (139 or 0.2%), Urdu (143 or 0.2%), Amharic (107 or 0.2%), and Tigrinya (104 or 0.2%).

As of 2013 the numbers of ELL learners by home language were: 56,104 for Spanish, 662 for Arabic, 538 for English, 528 for Vietnamese, 277 for Nepali, 271 for Mandarin, 212 for Swahili, 159 for Urdu, and 1,750 for other languages.

In the 2015-2016 school year, 58% of HISD students went to the schools of their attendance boundaries, about 27% attended other HISD schools, and 15% attended schools in other school districts and/or charter schools. Of high school students, 54.7% attended the schools they were zoned to, 33% attended HISD schools that they were not zoned to, and 11.5% attended charter schools or public schools in other districts. In the 2015-2016 school year there were 4,894 students transferring to four comprehensive high schools located in communities in which 33% or more of the students were Anglo White (Bellaire, Heights, Lamar, and Westside high schools) and 4,073 students transferred to other comprehensive high schools.

The student population declined by about 4,000 in 2018, and the expected decline for fall 2019 was 1,500. HISD officials cited enrollment in charter schools as a factor. The district chose to engage in advertising as a way to combat this.

=== Student body history ===
Until 1970 HISD counted its Hispanic and Latino students as "white."

Between the 1970-1971 and the 1971-1972 school years, during a period of white flight from major urban school districts across the United States, enrollment at HISD decreased by 16,000. Of that number, 700 were African Americans. The HISD student body had white students as the largest group until the 1972-1973 school year, when the largest group became the black students. The white student body decreased, while the Hispanic student body increased and became HISD's largest student demographic in the 1989-1990 school year. In 1975 the student body was 39% White and 19% Hispanic. In 1981 the district had 190,000 students; 31% of the district's students were Hispanic, and 21% were White. In 1990 the student body was 43% Hispanic, 40% Black, and 15% White. At the time 45% of HISD schools had no white students. By the 1990s HISD's student body was increasingly made up of racial and ethnic minority groups. In 1999 4,400 students in the HISD boundaries were attending state-chartered schools.

Of the 9th graders that were in the graduating classes of 2004-2005 in the district, 15% successfully obtained bachelor of arts and bachelor of science degrees. The U.S. average was 23%. In the District of Columbia Public Schools, 9% of its equivalent 9th grade class received a bachelor of arts or a bachelor of science and/or higher.

The preliminary fall enrollment for the 2006-2007 school year (203,163) had 7,000 fewer students than the 2005-2006 student enrollment (210,202), resulting in a more than 3% loss; the 2006-2007 enrollment was a 2.5% decrease from the fall 2004-2005 enrollment (208,454). From the preliminary 2006-2007 student count, the West and Central regions lost the most students, with a combined 4,400 student loss. The enrollment reported for the year in February 2007 was 202,936.

As of 2007, of the more than 29 HISD high schools, five had White students as the largest group of students; one of them, High School for Performing and Visual Arts, was the district's only White majority high school.

In 2010 Peter Messiah, the head of HISD's Homeless Education Office, said that HISD classified around 3,000 students as homeless. Margaret Downing of the Houston Press said that Messiah predicted "with confidence" that the actual number of homeless is higher because some families are too embarrassed to self-identify as homeless. Messiah also said that in the years leading to 2010, the number of students classified as homeless increased because the school district became better able to identify homeless students and because the Late-2000s recession continued to have an effect on their families.

As of 2011, between 50% and 66% of the non-Hispanic White students within the HISD boundaries enroll in private schools. In 2009, 72% of the non-Hispanic White students attending the district's schools were in magnet programs. In 2010 HISD had 15,340 non-Hispanic White students, the lowest numerical number of non-Hispanic Whites in recent history. This made up 7.6% of its student body. White enrollment increased to 17,313 by 2014, an increase by 13%. As of 2014, 8.2% of students were non-Hispanic White. Asian enrollment had increased since 2010. As of 2014 7,401 students were Asians, making up 3.5% of students.

In 2013 due to the absorption of the North Forest Independent School District, HISD's enrollment increased to 210,000.

== Staff and faculty demographics ==
As of 2007, Teach for America corps members made up about 25% of the number of HISD teachers. The district board voted to end its contract with TFA in 2019.

== Governance ==
As of June 2023, Mike Miles is the superintendent of schools. He was appointed by the Texas Education Agency Commissioner Mike Morath.

As of November 2023, the elected members of the HISD Board of Education are:

- District I: Elizabeth Santos
- District II: Savant Moore
- District III: Dani Hernandez
- District IV: Patricia Alen
- District V: Sue Deigaard
- District VI: Kendall Baker
- District VII: Bridget Wade
- District VIII: Plácido Gómez
- District IX: Myrna Guidry

Due to the June 2023 state takeover, elected board members serve in strictly advisory roles. Governance authority has been shifted to the state-appointed board of managers that primarily resides on the wealthier west side of the school district.

As of June 2026, the appointed board of managers are:

- Ric Campo
- Angela Lemond Flowers
- Michelle Cruz Arnold
- Janette Garza Lindner
- Paula Mendoza
- Edgar Colón
- Marty Goossen
- Lauren Gore
- Marcos Rosales

=== Superintendents ===
Former HISD superintendent Rod Paige used the PEER Program. Improving scores from its schools have caused a lot of praise from others nationwide. Kaye Stripling took over when Rod Paige headed to Washington, D.C. as part of United States President George W. Bush's administration cabinet. After Stripling stepped down as the interim Superintendent, Abelardo Saavedra became the superintendent of the district on December 9, 2004. Terry Grier became the district's superintendent 2009, followed by Richard A. Carranza in 2016 before standing down in order to become Chancellor of the New York City Schools. Dr. Grenita Lathan was appointed interim superintendent in March 2018 and left the school district to lead Springfield Public Schools (Illinois) in July 2021.

Billy Reagan served as superintendent until 1986. Joan Raymond began serving that year, and stepped down in 1991.

=== Political divisions ===
On December 1, 1994, HISD board members voted to divide HISD into 12 numbered geographic districts; of eleven districts, each district had one to three high schools. The 12th district was an alternative district.

Prior to Summer 2005, HISD had 13 administrative districts. Originally, the number of districts were to be cut to three, but HISD decided on cutting the number to five in fall 2005.

As of 2010 HISD schools are organized by elementary, middle, and high school offices.

Previously schools in Houston ISD were organized into "Regional Districts." Each district had its own Regional Superintendent.

There were five regional districts in Houston ISD:

- Central Regional District
- East Regional District
- North Regional District
- South Regional District
- West Regional District

Before its 2005 reorganization, HISD had the following districts:

Geographic districts:

- Central District
- East District
- North District
- North Central District
- Northeast District
- Northwest District
- South District
- South Central District
- Southeast District
- Southwest District
- West District

Other districts:

- Alternative District
- Acres Homes Coalition Schools

An additional district, West Central, was later established before the reorganization.

=== Taxation ===
As of 2010, of the school districts in Harris County, Houston ISD has the lowest taxation rate.

=== Support services ===
In 1948, Federal funding for school lunch programs became available. The district refused to participate and was unable to raise funds elsewhere. As a result, there were no free or reduced-price lunches for local schoolchildren until 1967.

In the 2000s HISD established "Breakfast in the Classroom." The program was replaced with a free breakfast program based in cafeterias. The Houston Press published a story about accounting irregularities regarding a program; the State of Texas announced it would investigate the program. On February 4, 2005, HISD Superintendent Abelardo Saavedra announced that the program was suspended. By 2006 HISD resumed its free breakfast programs.

== Houston ISD television channel ==
HISD TV is an educational cable access channel.

Houses in the Houston ISD area get the Houston ISD channel on cable.

- Channel 18 of Comcast
- Channel 99 of AT&T U-verse
- Channel 76 of Phonoscope Communications
- Channel 96 of Suddenlink
- Channel 18 of TV Max

== HISD coverage area ==
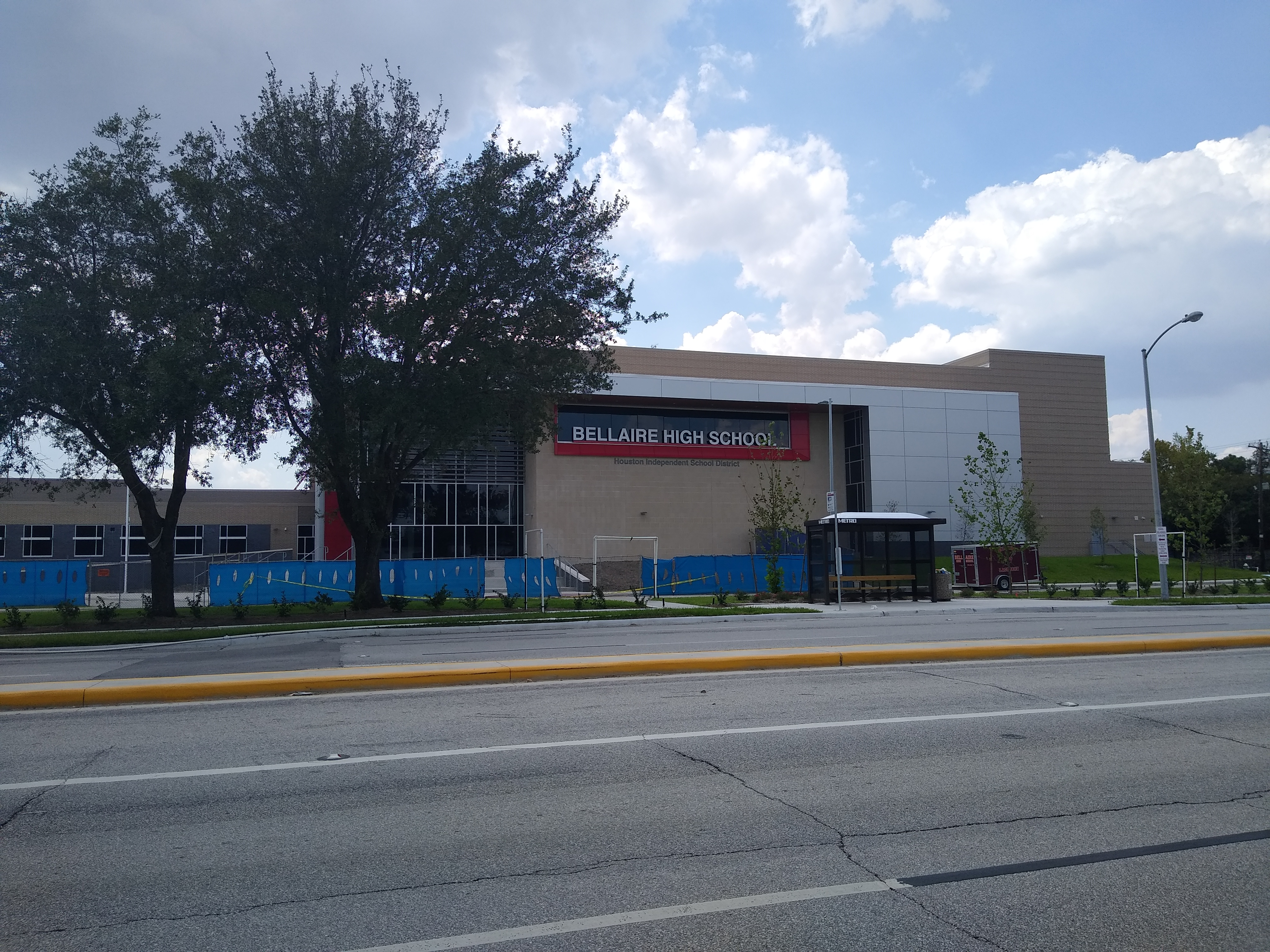
Bellaire High School

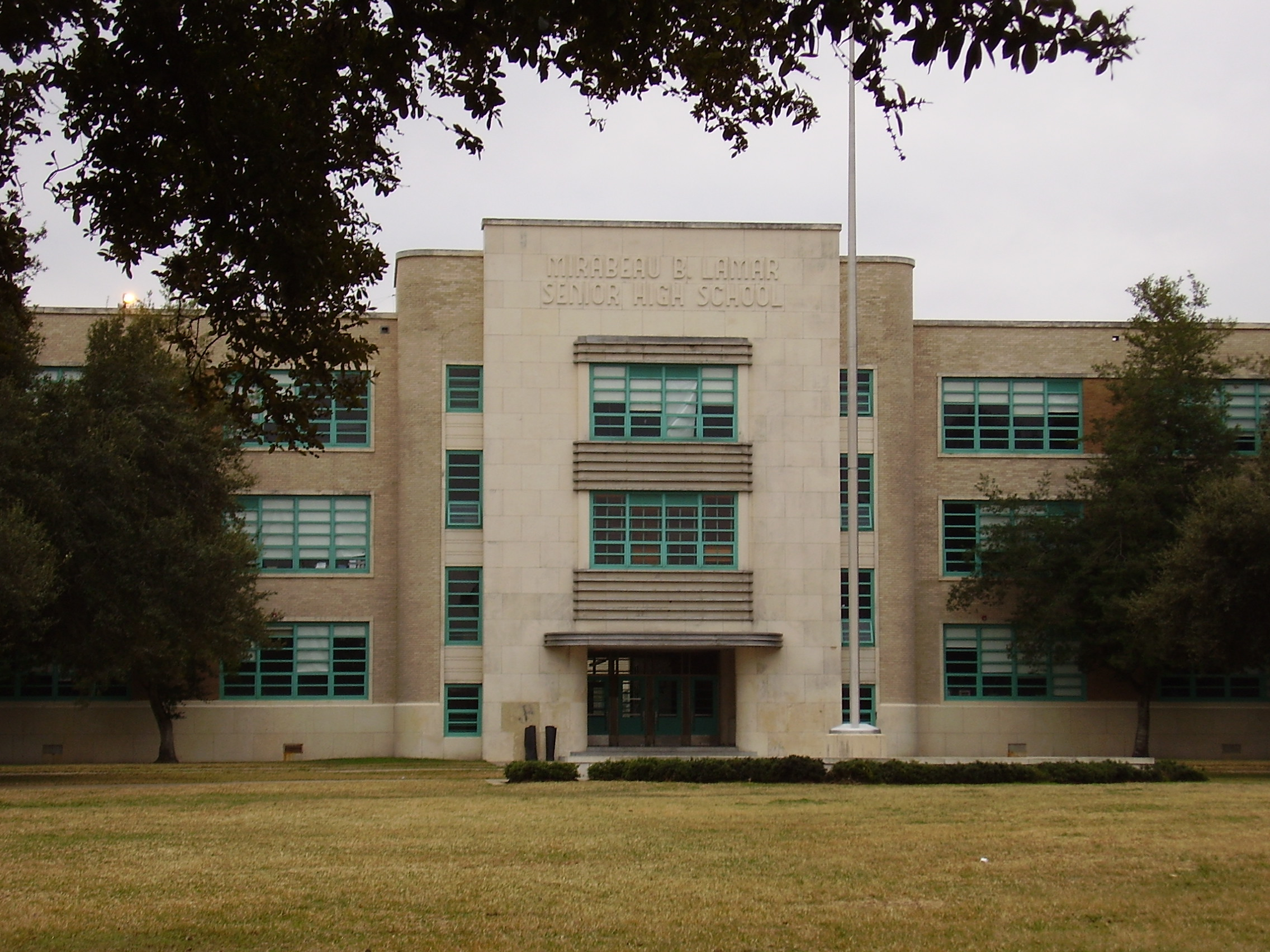
Lamar High School

The district covers territory in nine municipalities and some unincorporated areas in Greater Houston, including: all of the cities of Bellaire, West University Place. Southside Place, and most of the area within the Houston city limits. HISD also takes students from the Harris County portion of Missouri City, a portion of Jacinto City, a small portion of Hunters Creek Village, a small portion of Piney Point Village, and a small portion of Pearland; Pearland annexed territory within HISD between 1998 and 2005.

All of the HISD area lies within the taxation area for the Houston Community College System.

=== Cities ===
Houston ISD covers all of the following municipalities:

- Bellaire
- Southside Place
- West University Place

Houston ISD covers portions of the following municipalities:

- Houston (the majority of Houston, including all of the area inside the 610 Loop, falls under HISD)
- Hunters Creek Village (areas south of Buffalo Bayou are HISD)
- Jacinto City (areas north of Market street are in Houston ISD)
- Missouri City (Harris County portion only)
- Pearland (A section of the Harris County portion)
- Piney Point Village (areas south of Buffalo Bayou are in HISD)

HISD also covers unincorporated sections of Harris County, including portions of the Airline Improvement District.

Prior to 1982, the district included the small Harris County section of Stafford. Stafford residents voted to form a municipal school district in 1977.

== Transportation ==
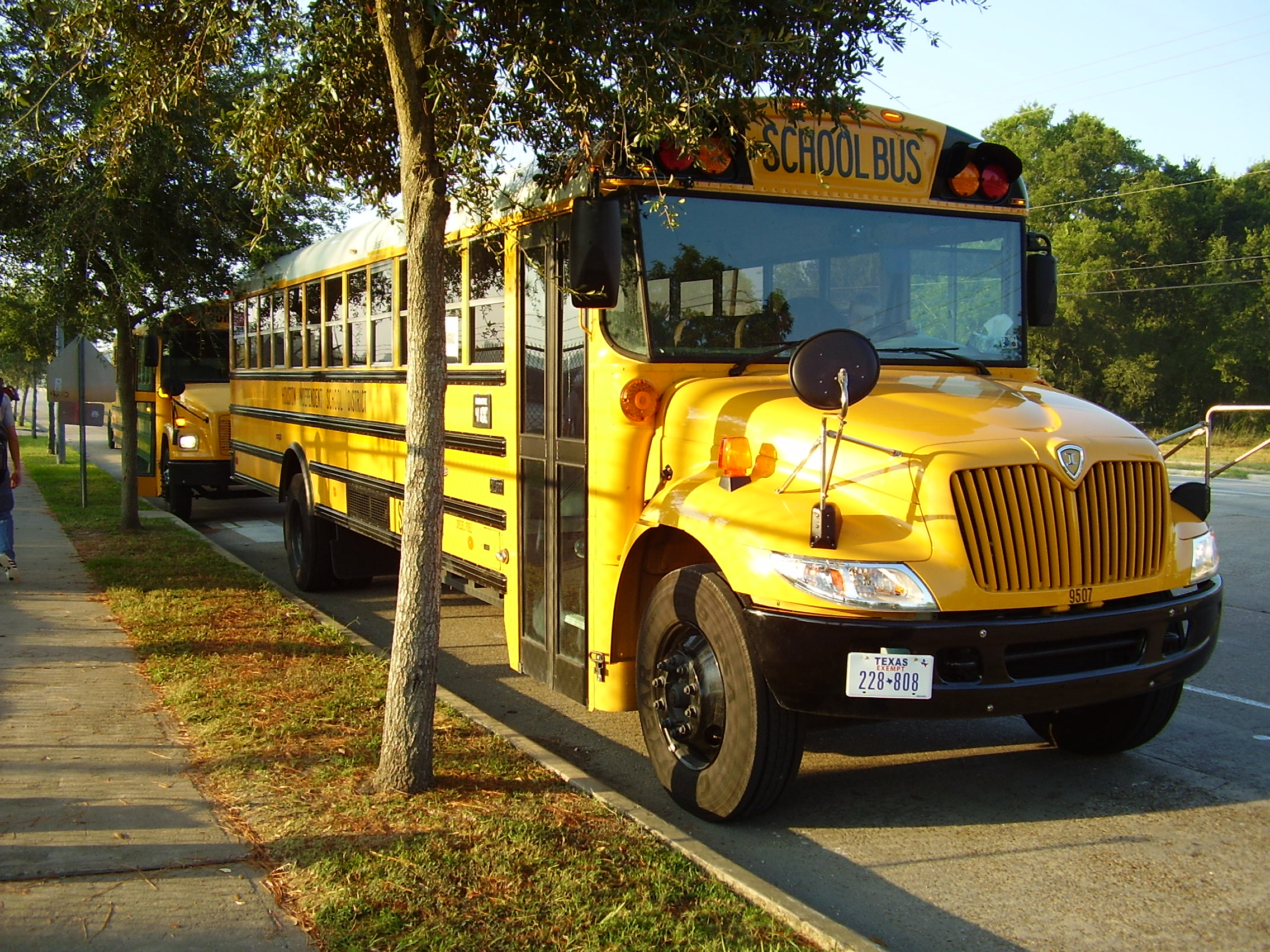
A Houston ISD CE300 school bus made by IC Corporation.

Houston ISD grants school bus transportation to any Houston ISD resident attending his or her zoned school or attending a magnet program who lives 2 miles (3.2 km) or more away from the campus (as measured by the nearest public roads) or must cross treacherous obstacles in order to reach the campus. Certain special education students are also permitted to use school bus transportation. HISD does not provide transportation for pre-kindergarten students.

== Schools ==
In HISD grades kindergarten and grades 1 through 5 are considered to be elementary school, grades 6 through 8 are considered to be middle school, and grades 9 through 12 are considered to be high school. Some elementary schools go up to the sixth grade. Some districts have grades elementary grades K-3 and 4-6 and then junior high school grades 7-8 and then high school grades 9-12.

Every house in HISD is assigned to an elementary school, a middle school, and a high school. HISD has a number of alternative programs and transfer options available to students who want a specialized education and/or dislike their home schools.

=== Characteristics of schools and White enrollment ===
Donald McAdams wrote that in the 1990s, within trustee District 5 there were schools that were about 50% White that usually had ample parent support and stronger test scores while there were schools about 90% or higher minorities that had low test scores and little to no parent support. He explained that in Houston white parents sent children to HISD schools that had minority children as long as the minority children tended to be middle class and that there were not too many of them. A number of black students who lived in District 5 were middle class children who took school buses to the schools and did not live in the school zones. According to McAdams their enrollment levels were stable and White parents were comfortable with their presence. He added that poor black children tended to go to their neighborhood schools outside of District 5. McAdams also stated that White middle-class parents did not consider Asians and Asian Americans to be minorities who could make a school less attractive to them. In the 1980s and 1990s increased enrollment of poor, non-English speaking Central American students at some HISD neighborhood schools made them unattractive to White parents.

According to McAdams, the White middle class community accepted minority percentages of around 50% for elementary schools, and for middle and high schools the White community accepted minority percentages of over 70 because classes at those levels were separated by academic ability. If percentages of minorities exceeded the tolerable levels at a particular school, white parents withdrew their children from the said school until there were few White people left. According to McAdams, HISD administrators knew about the levels of minority percentages tolerable to White middle-class parents.

McAdams argued that class was a far more important consideration than race to White parents. He stated that despite how "negative" his comments about White HISD residents sounded, many of the White parents were "not necessarily racists" but instead wanted high quality academic instruction in their schools, as methods and instructions for poor children were not suited for middle class children. McAdams argued that the attitude of the White community being willing to send their children to schools with about 50% minority enrollment was more progressive than the previous White attitude around the 1960s which was hostile to any minority enrollment in White schools.

== Dress codes ==
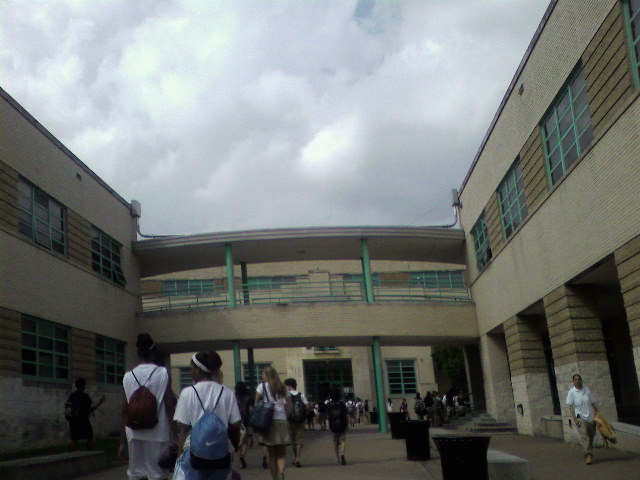
Students at multiple HISD high schools, including Lamar High School (pictured here), wear school uniforms

As of 2013, more than 230 schools required their students to wear school uniforms or "standardized dress."

As of 2006, over twenty high schools require their students to wear school uniforms or "standardized dress." Of them, one, Lamar High School, had a White plurality. Nine Houston ISD high schools did not require students to wear uniforms or standardized dress. Four of them had White students as the largest group of students.

In 1991 Key Middle School was the first school in HISD to introduce school uniforms. At the time, they were not required, but encouraged. Around the early 1990s the district began a trend of more localized management, so local schools set their own dress code policies. At the start of the 1994-1995 school year 37 HISD elementary and middle schools had uniforms or standardized dress; this was a large increase from the previous school year.

== Administration building ==
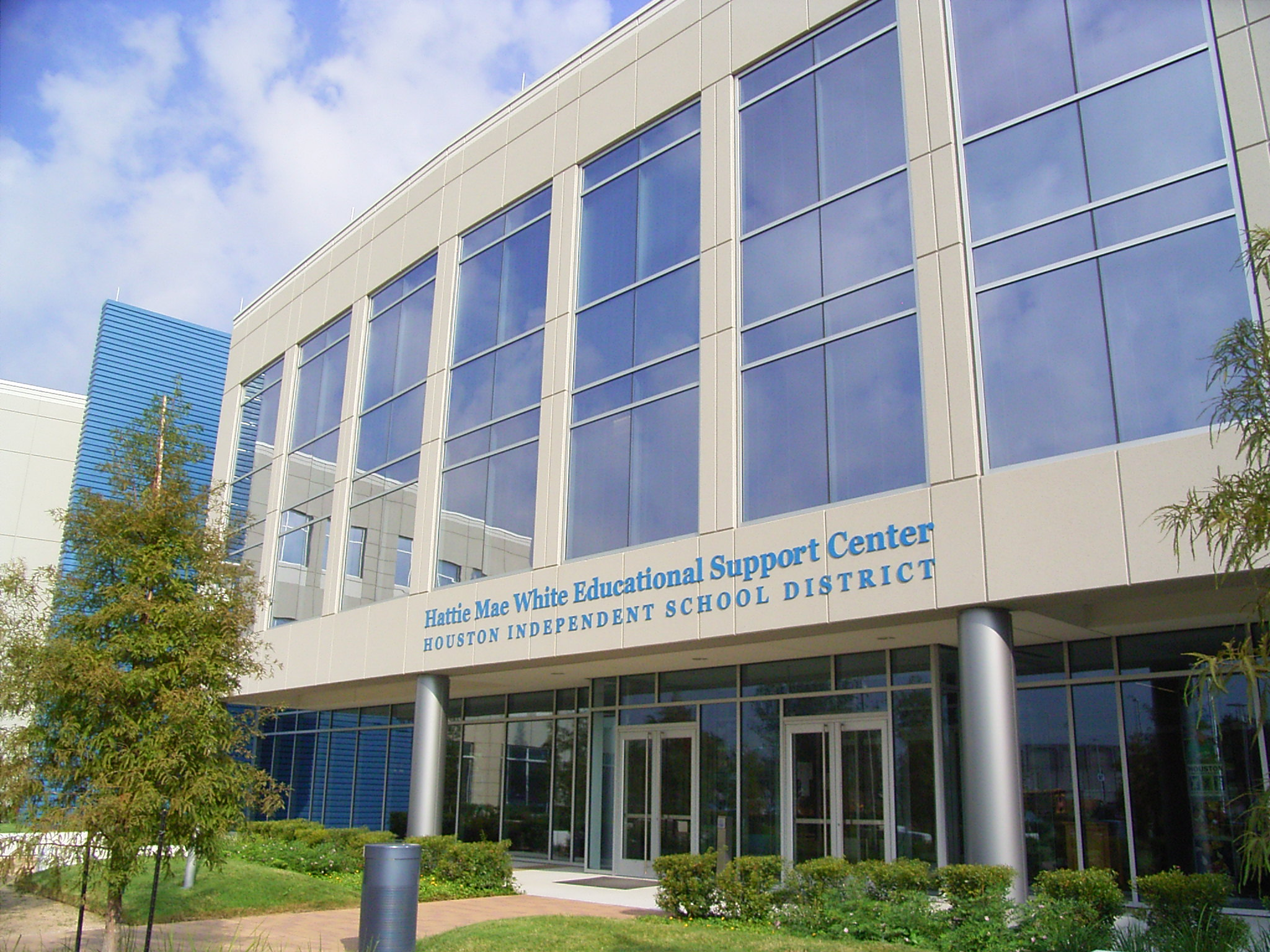
The Hattie Mae White Educational Support Center, the headquarters of the Houston Independent School District

The current administration building, the Hattie Mae White Educational Support Center, is in northwest Houston. The administration moved into the offices in spring 2006. It is named after Hattie Mae White, the first African American HISD board member and the first African-American public official in the State of Texas elected since Reconstruction.

The current Sam Houston High School building in the Northside opened in 1955. The previous Sam Houston High School building in Downtown Houston became the administrative headquarters of HISD. By the early 1970s HISD moved its headquarters out of the building, which was demolished. As of 2011 an HISD-owned parking lot occupies the former school lot; a state historical marker is at the lot. In meetings it had been proposed as a new location for the High School for the Performing and Visual Arts.

Houston ISD's administration building, which opened in 1969 and served in that capacity from July of that year to March 2006 was the 201,150-square-foot (18,687 m^{2}) Hattie Mae White Administration Building, at 3830 Richmond Avenue. It was designed by Neuhaus & Taylor in a New Brutalist style. The facility was labeled the "Taj Mahal" due to the counter-clockwise circular layout and the split-level floor pattern. The design made it difficult for wheelchair-using individuals to navigate the building. The complex cost U.S.$6 million. The building had tropical indoor atriums, causing critics to criticize the spending priorities of the district. When the district considered cutting a popular kindergarten program for financial reasons, taxpayers voted a number of board members out of office. The district sold the former complex for $38 million to a company that demolished the site and developed a mixed-use commercial property; demolition began on September 14, 2006. Demolition crews destroyed the Will Rogers Elementary School, an adjacent school at 3101 Weslayan that closed in spring 2006. The former HISD administration building appears in the film The Thief Who Came to Dinner. The land of the former administration building now includes a Costco among other businesses.

== Athletic facilities ==
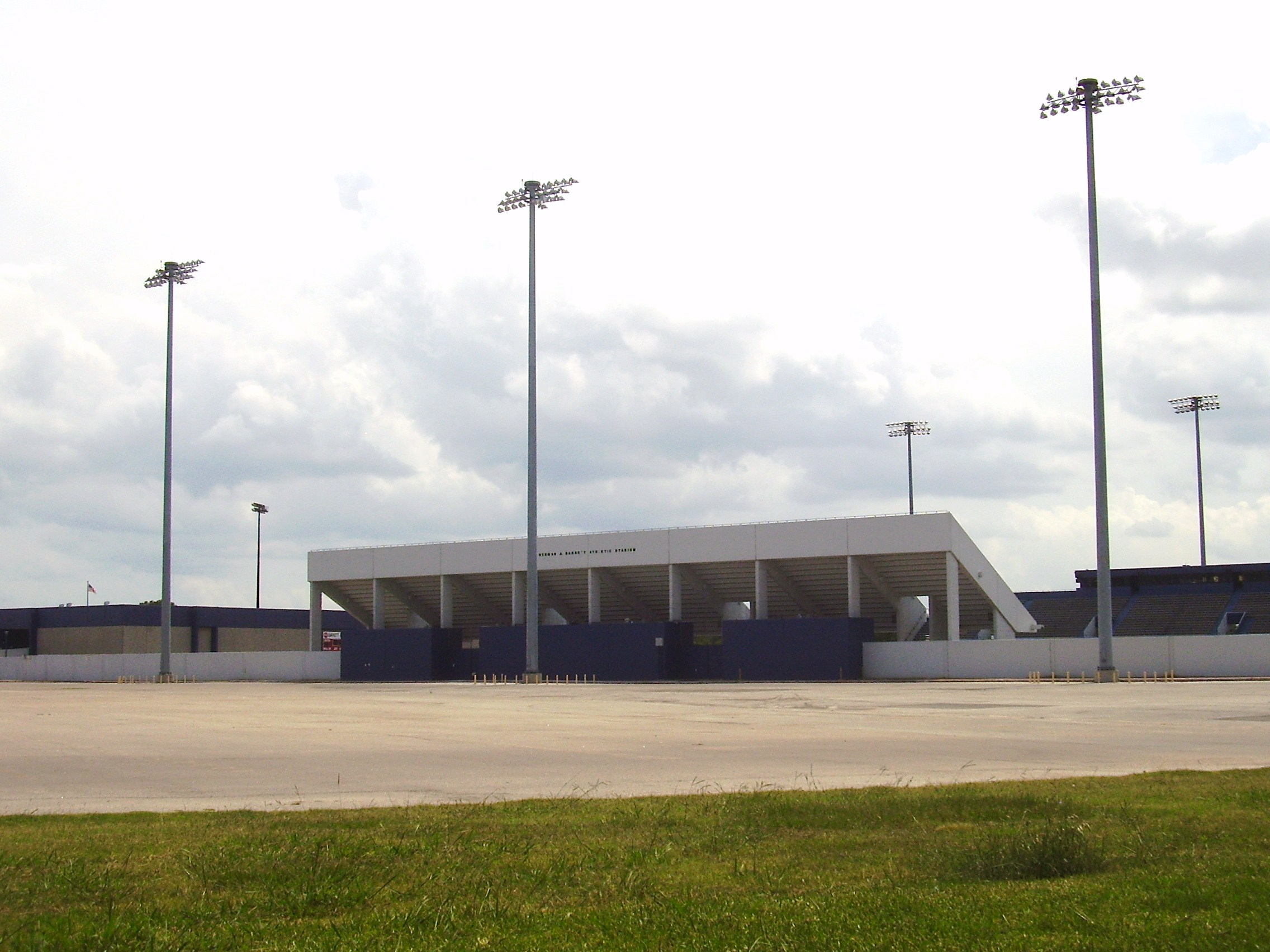
Hermann A. Barnett Stadium

Early HISD athletic facilities included West End Park (purchased in 1928) and Robertson Stadium (opened in 1942).

HISD has three athletic facility centers that were under its control as of June 30, 2013: Herman A. Barnett Sports Complex, Joe K. Butler Sports Complex, and the two-stadium Delmar - Dyer Sports Complex. Barnett has the capacity of 8,000 for American football and track games, 2,750 for basketball games, and 2,500 for soccer (football) games. Butler can seat 8,000 for American football and track games and 2,500 for basketball games. Butler also has middle school and high school baseball fields, which have a seating capacity of 4,500. The Delmar Stadium, an American football stadium, has a seating capacity of 12,500. The Delmar Fieldhouse has a capacity of 5,400. The Delmar baseball field has a capacity of 1,500. The Delmar middle school stadium has 3,000. The Dyer Stadium has a seating capacity of 6,000 for American football and track games.

In addition, the 12,000-capacity Jones-Cowart Stadium, which is used for American football, is located on the property of the former Smiley High School, now North Forest High School. When it was a part of the North Forest Independent School District (NFISD), it served as the district's stadium for sporting events. As of July 1, 2013, the NFISD territory was merged into HISD.

On September 12, 2013, HISD announced that it plans to demolish the existing 5,400-seat Delmar-Tusa Fieldhouse and build a new one at the same site. In the 1960s the old fieldhouse served as the home court for the University of Houston basketball team. HISD moved several scheduled events to the Mark Anthony Wilkins Pavilion at Forest Brook Middle School. The new facility is scheduled to open in 2016.

== Notable employees and teachers ==
- J. Don Boney, former administrator
- Lyndon B. Johnson, a teacher who became the 36th President of the United States
- Laura Bush, a teacher at Kennedy Elementary School who later became the First Lady of the United States
- Van G. Garrett, poet
- Alberto Gonzales, chair of the Commission for District Decentralization, later became United States Attorney General
- Thaddeus S. Lott Sr.
- Edison E. Oberholtzer, former superintendent, founder and first president of the University of Houston
- Rod Paige, former superintendent, became the United States Secretary of Education
- Noemi Dominguez, a teacher at Benjamin Franklin Elementary School who was murdered by Ángel Maturino Reséndiz

== See also ==
- List of school districts in Texas
- List of schools in Harris County, Texas
- Houston Area Independent Schools — association of Houston-area private schools.
