= South San Antonio Independent School District =

School district in Texas, United States

Coordinates: 29°21′17″N 98°36′42″W

South San Antonio Independent School District (South San ISD, SSAISD) is a public school district based in San Antonio, Texas (USA). The district serves southern and southwestern portions of the city. For the 2022–2023 school year, the district served 7,872 students in 18 schools. This district was the 107th-largest by enrollment in the state of Texas.

== History ==
From 2013 to 2018, total SSAISD enrollment declined by 1,400. The enrollment from the 2013–2014 school year until August 2019 decreased by 12%. From the beginning to the end of the 2017–2018 school year, the enrollment declined by over 550 students. From October 2018 until the end of the 2018–2019 school year the enrollment declined from 8,900 to 8,630.

In 2019, the board chose to re-open West Campus High, Kazen Middle, and Athens elementary, even though the superintendent and a large minority on the board opposed the decision. The enrollments did not reach the district's projections. More than $2.7 million, including $340,000 in cleaning costs, was spent on renovations of the three campuses.

== Superintendent ==
From 2014, the superintendent of South San Antonio Independent School District was Abelardo Saavedra, who was appointed in March 2014. He resigned from SSAISD, with his last day being Friday October 12, 2018. Saavedra's decision to resign, as well as the district's agreement regarding his departure, was approved by the SSAISD board on a 6-1 basis that day. The then-Palacios Independent School District (PISD) superintendent, Alexandro Flores, replaced him.

Krista Torralva stated that, after a change in the composition of the school board, the new leading bloc of board members did not support Flores. In September 2019 Flores, along with three board members, resigned. Chief academic officer Dolores Sendejo became the interim superintendent.

== Schools ==
Secondary schools
Name	Grades	Established	Mascot	Colors	Additional information
South San Antonio High School	9-12	1935	Bobcats	Blue & White	
Dwight Middle School	6-8	1957	Bobcats	Blue & White	Former South San Antonio High School campus
Alan B. Shepard Middle School	6-8	1970	Cougars	Red, White, & Blue	Former mascot was the Patriots until 2009
Robert C. Zamora Middle School	6-8	2003	Jaguars	Baby Blue & Navy Blue	

Primary schools
Name	Grades	Established	Mascot	Colors	Additional information
Neil Armstrong Elementary School	PK-5	1970	Astros	Red, White, & Blue	
Roy P. Benavidez Elementary School	PK-5		Patriots	Red, White, & Blue	
Miguel Carrillo Jr. Elementary School	PK-5		Wildcats	Maroon & White	
Five Palms Elementary Elementary School	PK-5	1970	Eagles	Blue & White	
Hutchins Elementary School	PK-5	1954	Vikings	Purple & White	
Frank L. Madla Elementary School	PK-5	1962	Alligators	Red & White	Renamed from Royalgate Elementary in 2006
Palo Alto Elementary School	PK-5		Rams	Red & Blue	
Price Elementary School	PK-5	1952	Cobras	Blue & Yellow	

Former schools
Name	Grades	Established	Closed	Mascot	Colors	Additional information
West Campus High School	9-12	1976, 2019	2007, 2024	Cougars	Red & White	Closed due to a flood. Never reopened due to declining enrollments. Was converted to administrative space, then returned to
Abraham Kazen Middle School	6-8	????, 2019	2017, 2023	Panthers	Black & Gold	
Athens Elementary School	PK-5	????, 2019	2017, 2023	Cowboys	Blue & White	
Kindred Elementary School	PK-5	1923	2023	Tigers	Red, White, & Blue	
Antonio Olivares Elementary School	PK-5	1974	2004			

== Distinctions ==
South San Antonio ISD received a “No Improvement Required” status for the 2016 school year, and none of its schools received failing ratings. This was the second year in a row for the district. That same year, the district's STAAR results produced a total of 21 TEA distinctions that were awarded to 10 SSAISD campuses. This equates to two-thirds of the District's campuses earning at least one distinction, and made it the fourth highest percentage total for all Bexar County's independent school districts.

== School board ==
South San Antonio Independent School District is overseen by a seven-member board. They serve four-year terms by specific geographic district without compensation.

South San Antonio Board of Trustees
Member	Position	District #	Term ends
Angelina Osteguin	President	1	2018
Leticia Guerra	Vice president	4	2018
Linda Longoria	Secretary	3	2020
Louis Ybarra Jr.	Trustee	2	2020
Connie Prado	Trustee	5	2020
Helen Madla-Prather	Trustee	6	2018
Elda L. Flores	Trustee	7	2020

=== School board elections ===
Members of the South San Antonio Board of Trustees are elected to four-year terms. Four seats were up for election on November 4, 2014. The District 7 election was for an unexpired two-year term. Four seats were up for election on November 8, 2016.
