= Commission to Study the Potential Creation of a National Women's History Museum =

The Commission to Study the Potential Creation of a National Women's History Museum was a U.S. federal government commission established in 2014 to study whether there is a need for, and the feasibility of creating, a national women's history museum as part of the Smithsonian Institution in Washington, D.C. The commission was authorized by law on December 19, 2014, and its first members were appointed in May 2015. The commission presented its report in November 2016, recommending the creation of such a museum. Congress established the Smithsonian American Women's History Museum in 2020.

The commission should not be confused with the National Women's History Museum, a nonprofit organization founded in 1996 to advocate for a national women's history museum.

== Legislation ==
=== Congressional approval ===
As she had in every legislative session since 1998, Representative Carolyn Maloney introduced legislation to authorize a federal commission to study the need for and feasibility of establishing a National Women's History Museum. Her 2013 bill was the Commission to Study the Potential Creation of a National Women’s History Museum Act of 2013 (H.R. 863). On May 6, 2014, the House Natural Resources Committee favorably reported H.R. 863 to the floor of the U.S. House of Representatives (House Report 113-411, Part 2). But no further action was taken.

Meanwhile, a completely unrelated bill (H.R. 3979), which clarified federal law so that emergency services volunteers were not considered employees under the Patient Protection and Affordable Care Act, was moving through Congress. The House approved this bill on March 11, 2014. The U.S. Senate approved the bill, with amendments, on April 7, 2014, and sent the bill back to the House for resolving differences.

A third bill, to authorize national defense programs for 2015, was consuming the attention of Congress. Originating in the House, this bill (H.R. 4435, the Howard P. "Buck" McKeon National Defense Authorization Act for Fiscal Year 2015), passed the House on May 22, 2014. A companion bill, S. 2410 (the Carl Levin National Defense Authorization Act for Fiscal Year 2015) had been favorably reported by the Senate Armed Services Committee on June 2, 2014. No action had been taken on the bill, however, as a number of Senators were trying to attach highly controversial provisions to it. As the congressional session neared its conclusion in December 2014, the House needed to find a legislative vehicle for its preferred text for the national defense authorization bill. Subsequently, the House leadership settled on H.R. 3979. The House Rules Committee took up H.R. 3979, and significantly amended it. Rules Committee Print 113–58 modified the text of H.R. 3979 to include the provisions of H.R. 4435 (as amended) and most of S. 2410 (as amended in committee). Because time was running out on a wide range of bills acceptable to both the House and Senate, the House Rules Committee also included a large number of provisions extraneous to national defense. Most of these pertained to interior, natural resources, wilderness areas, and memorials. One of the provisions contained the text of H.R. 863. On December 4, 2014, the House voted overwhelming to approve the text of H.R. 3979 as offered in Rules Committee Print 113–58.

H.R. 3979 now moved back to the Senate. On December 10, the Senate Energy and Natural Resources favorably reported S. 398 (the companion bill to H.R. 863) to the Senate floor (S. Rept. 113-290). With H.R. 3979 already having passed the Senate once, it could now be taken up under Senate rules that prohibited the controversial amendments many Senate members had sought. The Senate took up H.R. 3979 on December 9. Twice on December 10, Senator Tom Coburn attempted to strip all the interior, natural resources, wilderness areas, and memorials sections from the bill, but the chair ruled his amendments out of order. No amendments were made to H.R. 3979. The Senate re-approved H.R. 3979 on December 12.

H.R. 3979 was signed into law by President Barack Obama on December 19, 2014 (Public Law 113-291).

=== Text of the legislation ===
The legislation authorizing a Commission to Study the Potential Creation of a National Women's History Museum was enacted into law as Title XXX-Natural Resources Related General Provisions, Subtitle D—National Park System Studies, Management, and Related Matters, Section 3056 of the National Defense Authorization Act of 2015.

Section 3056(b) establishes a Commission to Study the Potential Creation of a National Women's History Museum. The following subsections establish an eight-member commission, two members of which shall be appointed by the majority leader of the Senate, the Speaker of the House, the minority leader of the Senate, and the minority leader of the House. The qualifications of the commissioners are also laid out. Generally, they must show a commitment to women's history, art, political or economic status, or culture, and should show additional expertise in areas such as museum administration or design, fundraising, teaching, research, or public service. Employees of the federal government are prohibited from serving on the commission, and the commissioners must be appointed within 90 days of the passage of the act. The commission shall elect one of its members as a chairperson.

Section 3056(c)(1) lays out the duties of the commission. Within 18 months of its first meeting, the commission must submit to the president of the United States and the Congress a report containing recommendations regarding the need for and the feasibility of establishing a National Women's History Museum. The report must address the availability and cost of acquiring collections, whether a national museum will negatively impact regional women's history museums, potential locations for a museum in the Washington, D.C., metropolitan area, whether the museum should be part of the Smithsonian Institution, the governance structure of a museum, how women would be included in the development and design of a museum, and the cost of building and operating a museum.

Section 3056(c)(2) lays out additional requirements the commission must address regarding fundraising for a potential museum. The commission must plan for the establishment, operation, and maintenance of the museum solely through public contributions. The goal of these plans should be to endow the museum in perpetuity, without reliance on any federal funding. The commission must also consider what role the National Women's History Museum—a nonprofit organization established in 1996 to promote the establishment of a national women's history museum—should play in the fundraising plan. The commission is required to seek an independent review of the viability of its fundraising recommendations.

The Commission to Study the Potential Creation of a National Women's History Museum may not rely on federal funds to pay its members or implement its programs. Commission members must serve without pay, although their travel expenses may be reimbursed from funds the commission raises. The commission is authorized, however, to hire an executive director and staff (if it can raise the funds to pay for them). It may ask federal agencies for technical assistance, but no federal employee may be detailed to work for the commission. The commission must self-terminate 30 days after submission of its reports to the president and Congress. However, the commission is authorized to host a national conference regarding a potential National Women's History Museum before its work ends.

== Commission members ==
Pursuant to federal law, the following members of the Commission to Study the Potential Creation of a National Women's History Museum were appointed by the Speaker of the House:

- Marilyn Musgrave, a former Representative from the 4th District of Colorado, and currently project director of the Susan B. Anthony List, a nonprofit supporting pro-life candidate for political office.
- Kathy Wills Wright, former deputy director of the USA Freedom Corps under President George W. Bush

The following members were appointed by the Senate Majority Leader:

- Jane Abraham, General Chairman of the Susan B. Anthony List
- Bridget M. Bush, a lawyer with the firm of Landrum & Shouse in Lexington, Kentucky, and founder of the politically conservative blog Elephants in the Blue Grass

The following members were appointed by the House Minority Leader:

- Pat Mitchell, Executive Chairman of The Paley Center for Media and former president and CEO of PBS
- Emily Kernan Rafferty, former president of the Metropolitan Museum of Art, member of the board of directors of the National September 11 Memorial & Museum, and chair of the board of directors of the Federal Reserve Bank of New York

The following members were appointed by the Senate Minority Leader:

- Mary Boies, lawyer and co-founder of the law firm Boies & McInnis, former Vice President of CBS and former general counsel if the Civil Aeronautics Board
- Maria Socorro Pesqueira, President & CEO of Mujeres Latinas en Accion (Latin Women in Action), a Chicago-based social service agency

The Commission to Study the Potential Creation of a National Women's History Museum should not be confused with the National Women's History Museum Inc., a private, nonprofit foundation established in 1996 to promote the creation of a national women's history museum in Washington, D.C. The chair of the nonprofit's board of directors is Susan Whiting, and its chief executive officer is Joan Wages.
