= American Women's History Initiative =

Women initiative

The American Women's History Initiative (AWHI) was launched by the Smithsonian Institution in Washington D.C. in 2018. The initiative aims to collect, research, educate, and disseminate compelling historical record of the accomplishment of American women.

== History ==
In 2016, the American Museum of Women's History Congressional Commission submitted a report to Congress, addressing the need for a museum to be dedicated to women's history in the United States, the content and location of the museum, and how it will be funded. Acknowledging that U.S. history is incomplete without women's history, the Commission recommended that a Women's History Initiative be established within the Smithsonian Institution, as the first step toward a permanent museum. The report also set out a concrete path for the museum to be built within the Smithsonian museum district.

In 2020, Congress established the Smithsonian American Women's History Museum.

== Development and exhibitions ==
The initiative has its own curators who develop programs and exhibitions to showcase women's history. It also intends to offer mentorship programs within the existing Smithsonian museums.

AWHI focuses its research on the diverse and missing history of American women spanning every race, class, ethnicity, religion, interest, political affiliation, and geographical region.

Since its inception, the American Women History Initiative has presented both online and on-site exhibitions such as "Her Story: A Century of Women Writers" at the National Portrait Gallery, "Girlhood: It's Complicated" at the National Museum of American History, among others.
