= South San Antonio High School =

Location
- 7535 Barlite Boulevard; San Antonio, Bexar County, Texas 78224; United States; 29.350766°N 98.547517°W

Information
- School type: Public high school
- School district: South San Antonio Independent School District
- NCES School ID: 484068004617
- Principal: Mr. Hernandez
- Faculty: 97.32 (on an FTE basis)
- Grades: 9–12
- Enrollment: 1,786 (2022–2023)
- Student to teacher ratio: 18.35
- Colors: Royal Blue & White
- Athletics conference: UIL Class AAAAAA
- Mascot: Bobcats/Lady Bobcats
- Website: South San Antonio High School

South San Antonio High School is a public high school located in the city of San Antonio, Texas, United States and classified as a 5A school by the UIL. It is a part of the South San Antonio Independent School District located in southwest Bexar County. South San Antonio High School opened in a new building on August 26, 2013. For the 2024-2025 school year, the school was given a "D" by the Texas Education Agency.

== Athletics ==
The South San Antonio Bobcats compete in these sports

- Baseball
- Basketball
- Cross Country
- Football
- Golf
- Powerlifting
- Softball
- Swimming
- Tennis
- Track and Field
- Volleyball

=== State Titles ===
- Baseball
  - 1958(3A), 1959(3A), 1961(3A), 1963(3A), 1964(3A), 1966(3A), 1967(3A),
- Boys Basketball
  - 1961(3A)
