= Clarence Brandley =

Person wrongly convicted of murder in Texas

Clarence Lee Brandley (September 24, 1951 – September 2, 2018) was an American man who was wrongly convicted of the rape and murder of Cheryl Dee Fergeson in 1981 and sentenced to death.

Brandley was working as a janitor supervisor at Conroe High School in Conroe, Texas when the 16-year-old student Fergeson was a visiting athlete from Bellville, Texas. Brandley was held for nine years on death row.

After lengthy legal proceedings and appeals that reached the Supreme Court of the United States, Clarence Brandley's conviction was overturned and he was freed in 1990. After his release, Brandley was involved in further legal proceedings over child support payments that had accrued over his time in prison. He filed a $120 million lawsuit against various agencies of the State of Texas because of his arrest and wrongful conviction but received neither an apology nor a settlement.

== The crime ==
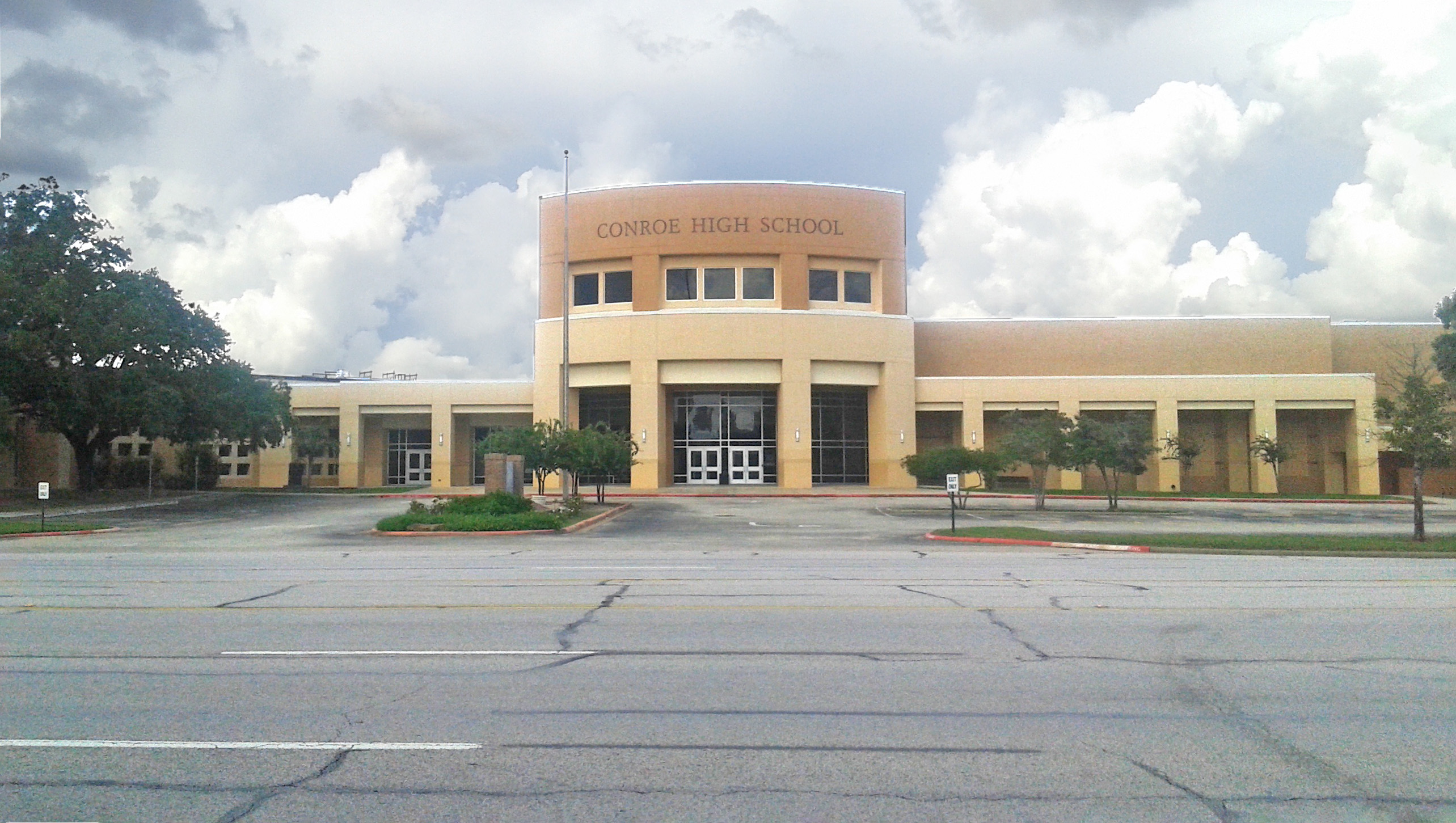
Conroe High School, where the murder occurred.

Cheryl Dee Fergeson, a 16-year-old junior at Bellville High School, was murdered on August 23, 1980. Fergeson was on a school volleyball team that had traveled to Conroe High School in Conroe, Texas to play a match. Prior to the game, Fergeson was seen heading to the washroom by a teammate. When she failed to return, the team split up to search for her, but did not locate the girl. They continued with the volleyball game as scheduled. When Fergeson had still not returned by the end of the game, the search was resumed.

Her body was found in the loft above the school auditorium by custodians Clarence Brandley and Henry "Icky" Peace.

== Investigation ==
=== Custodians ===
A total of five custodians were working at the school that day: Brandley, Peace, Gary Acreman, Sam Martinez, and John Henry Sessum. All of the men were classified as white except Brandley, who was African American. (Note: Martinez was Mexican-American, but sources describe him as white.)

Suspicion immediately fell on Brandley and Peace, as they had located the body. According to Peace, when the two were questioned together, Texas Ranger Wesley Styles told them, "One of you is going to have to hang for this" and, turning to Brandley, added, "Since you're the nigger, you're elected."

The other three custodians claimed to have seen the victim enter a girls' restroom near the school gymnasium, and soon to have seen Brandley walking toward the restroom with an armload of toilet paper. They claimed that they told Brandley there was a girl in the restroom, and that he replied that he was taking the toilet paper to the boys' restroom. They said that they did not see him again until about 45 minutes later, after a search had begun for the missing student. The fourth custodian, Peace, subsequently added that Brandley was insistent on immediately searching the loft. When they found Fergeson's body, Peace said that Brandley calmly checked for a pulse and then notified the authorities. All four said that only Brandley had keys to the auditorium where the body was found.

=== Brandley's statements ===
Before an all-white Montgomery County grand jury on August 28, 1980, five days after the crime, Brandley professed innocence. Although he contradicted his white co-workers in several respects, he acknowledged that he had disappeared for perhaps 30 minutes about the time the murder was believed to have occurred. He said he was in the custodian's office smoking and listening to music alone. He also testified that a number of other persons had master keys that would open the auditorium. He noted that doors near the stage usually were propped open with a two-by-four.

== Trials ==
=== December 1980 ===
Brandley was tried in December 1980 before an all-white jury. The prosecution's case was based entirely on circumstantial evidence and witness statements, as there was no physical evidence linking Brandley to the crime. Pubic hair with purported "negroid characteristics" were allegedly found on the body, but no expert testimony was given at trial to indicate they belonged to Brandley. These hairs were subsequently lost from the prosecution's exhibits and have never been recovered. Spermatozoa recovered from the victim's body had been destroyed before the trial. It was never tested to determine whether it was Brandley's. A fresh blood spot had been found on the victim's blouse but it did not come from Fergeson and could not have been Brandley's. The spot was Type A, but Brandley had Type O blood.

One juror found the evidence insufficient to establish guilt and refused to convict, forcing Judge Sam Robertson, Jr. to declare a mistrial. The name of the holdout juror, William Shreck, was leaked, and he received anonymous harassing telephone calls. One man, whose anonymous communication was monitored by police, threatened Shreck, "We're going to get you, nigger lover."

=== February 1981 ===
Brandley's second trial in February 1981 was held before a different judge, but also had an all-white jury. The prosecution did not call John Sessum, one of the original witnesses. Later it was discovered that the prosecution had decided against calling Sessum because he no longer was willing to support the other custodians' versions of events. The prosecution threatened him with a charge of perjury, but he still refused to comply.

The prosecution presented Danny Taylor, who had not testified previously. A junior at the school at the time of the crime, he had briefly also worked as a custodian there but was fired before the murder. Taylor claimed that Brandley had once commented – after a group of white female students walked past them – "If I got one of them alone, ain't no tellin' what I might do."

Dr. Joseph Jachimczyk, medical examiner for Harris County, testified that the victim had died of strangulation. He said that a belt belonging to Brandley was consistent with the ligature used in the crime. In closing argument, District attorney James Keeshan said that Brandley had a second job at a funeral home and suggested that he may have been a necrophiliac and raped Fergeson after she was dead. This, despite the fact that Keeshan had a report stating that Brandley did only odd jobs at the funeral home and had never been involved in the preparation of bodies for burial. The defense objected to Keeshan's remark as inflammatory, but Judge John Martin overruled the objection.

== Post-conviction ==
Eleven months after Brandley was convicted and sentenced to death, his appellate lawyers discovered that exculpatory evidence had disappeared while in prosecution custody. This included a Caucasian pubic hair and other hairs recovered from Fergeson's body that were neither hers nor Brandley's. Also missing were photographs taken of Brandley when he was arrested on the day of the crime. These showed that he was not wearing the belt that the prosecution claimed had been the murder weapon. The missing evidence was all the more troubling combined with the pretrial destruction of the spermatozoa.

Appellate briefs stressed the willful destruction and disappearance of potentially exculpatory evidence in Brandley's case, but the Texas Court of Criminal Appeals affirmed the conviction and death sentence without mentioning this issue. "No reasonable hypothesis is presented by the evidence to even suggest that someone other than [Brandley] committed the crime", said the court. Brandley V. Texas, 691 S.W.2d 699 (1985).

Brenda Medina, who lived in the nearby town of Cut and Shoot, Texas, saw a television broadcast about the Brandley case. Saying she had been unaware of the case until then, she told a neighbor that her former live-in boyfriend, James Dexter Robinson, had told her in 1980 that he had committed such a crime. Robinson had previously worked as a janitor at Conroe High School. Medina said she had not believed Robinson then, but with the current publicity, she did. At the neighbor's suggestion, Medina consulted an attorney, who took her to see District Attorney Peter Speers III. (He had succeeded Keeshan after the latter ascended to the Texas District Court bench.) Speers concluded that Medina was unreliable. He decided therefore that he had no obligation to inform Brandley's lawyers. The private attorney she had consulted thought otherwise, and brought her to the attention of the defense.

=== State habeas corpus sought ===
After obtaining Medina's sworn statement, Brandley's lawyers petitioned the Texas Court of Criminal Appeals for a writ of habeas corpus. The court ordered an evidentiary hearing, which was conducted by District Court Judge Ernest A. Coker.

Before calling Medina to testify at the evidentiary hearing, Brandley's defense team called Edward Payne, father-in-law of Gary Acreman. He was one of the school custodians who had testified at both Brandley trials, and the defense now suspected he may have been a co-perpetrator of the crime with Robinson. Payne testified that Acreman had told him where Fergeson's clothes had been hidden two days before the authorities found them.

After Medina related details of Robinson's purported confession, Brandley's lawyers called John Sessum, the custodian who had testified at the first trial but not the second. Sessum contradicted what he had said at the first trial. He stated that he had seen Acreman follow Cheryl Fergeson up a staircase leading to the auditorium and then heard her scream, "No" and "Don't." Later that day, Acreman warned Sessum not to tell anyone what he had seen. But Sessum said that he had told Wesley Styles, the Texas Ranger who was leading the investigation. According to Sessum, Styles threatened him with arrest if he did not testify consistently with Acreman's.

=== Community activism and result ===
Judge Coker recommended that Brandley be denied a new trial. A date had been set for Brandley's execution. Coker's ruling was accepted by the Court of Criminal Appeals on December 22, 1986. But civil rights activists, including Reverend Jew Don Boney, had organized and raised $80,000 to help finance further legal efforts on Brandley's behalf. The Rev. Boney was the chairman of the "Coalition to Free Clarence Lee Brandley", based in Houston. He led community efforts to have Brandley receive a fair trial. Interviewed on numerous national news outlets, Boney attracted significant media and community attention to the case. National Advocate James McCloskey, of Centurion Ministries in Princeton, New Jersey, also took on the case.

Working with a private investigator, McCloskey soon obtained a video-taped statement by Acreman stating that Robinson had killed Cheryl Fergeson and that he had seen Robinson place her clothes in the dumpster where they were later found. That is how Acreman knew where the clothes were before law enforcement found them. Although Acreman soon recanted that video statement, two witnesses had come forward attesting that they had heard Acreman say he knew who killed Fergeson, and that it was not Brandley. They also said that Acreman had said he would never reveal the girl's killer. Based on these statements, with Brandley's scheduled execution six days away, Coker granted a stay.

=== A fair hearing ===
After further investigation, Brandley's lawyers petitioned for another evidentiary hearing. The Court of Criminal Appeals granted this on June 30, 1987. The new hearing was conducted by Special State District Judge Perry Pickett. Robinson, Acreman, and Styles testified for the prosecution.

Robinson admitted he had told Brenda Medina in 1980 that he had killed the young woman in Conroe, but claimed he had said that only to frighten Medina. She had been pressuring him because she was pregnant, he said, and he wanted her to leave him alone. Acreman persisted with his previous trial testimony, but did admit that Robinson had been at Conroe High School on the morning of the murder. Evidence established that both Robinson and Acreman, unlike Brandley, had Type A blood, which was consistent with that found on Fergeson's blouse.

Texas Ranger Styles acknowledged that even before he had interviewed any witnesses, Brandley was his only suspect. When pressed about why he had not obtained a hair sample from Acreman to compare with the Caucasian pubic hair and other hairs found on the victim, Styles stammered, "Let's say I didn't do it and it wasn't done, and why it wasn't done, I don't know."

On October 9, 1987, Judge Pickett recommended that the Court of Criminal Appeals grant Brandley a new trial, declaring:

The litany of events graphically described by the witnesses, some of it chilling and shocking, leads me to the conclusion the pervasive shadow of darkness has obscured the light of fundamental decency and human rights." Pickett went on to say, that in his thirty-year career, "no case has presented a more shocking scenario of the effects of racial prejudice, perjured testimony, witness intimidation [and] an investigation the outcome of which was predetermined.

After 14 months, the Court of Criminal Appeals accepted Picket's recommendation with a sharply split en banc decision on December 13, 1989 (Ex Parte Brandley, 781 S.W.2d 886 (1989)).

The prosecution appealed, delaying disposition of the case another 10 months. But within hours of the U.S. Supreme Court's denial of certiorari on October 1, 1990 (Texas v. Brandley, 498 U.S. 817 (1990)), they dropped all charges. Brandley was released from state prison. A few months later he was ordained as a Baptist minister. Within the year, he married.

== Child support ==
Upon his release, Brandley discovered that he owed almost $50,000 in child support debt, which had accumulated in the years that he was wrongly imprisoned. This is because a federal law known as the Bradley amendment stipulates that once a child support order has been established, money owed cannot be retroactively reduced or forgiven, even in cases where the debtor was imprisoned and presumably incapable of paying. Brandley said: "It's like a double insult." As of 2011, Brandley's wages were still being garnished, and the debt stood at $12,683.

== See also ==
- List of exonerated death row inmates
- List of wrongful convictions in the United States

== Works cited ==
- Applebome, Peter (October 4, 1987). "The Truth is Also on Trial in a Texas Death Row Case". The New York Times.
- Davies, Nick (1991). White Lies: The True Story of Clarence Brandley, Presumed Guilty in the American South, ISBN 978-0-7011-3724-3
- Dow, David R. (2005). Executed on a Technicality: Lethal Injustice on America's Death Row (1st ed.). Boston: Beacon Press. pp. 121. ISBN 0-8070-4420-2. OCLC 56913483.
- Gordon, Cathy (1986). "Woman's Testimony May Help Death-Row Inmate." Houston Chronicle. July 18.
- Gross, Alexandra
- Haines, Herbert (1996). Against Capital Punishment: The Anti-Death Penalty Movement in America, 1972–1994. Oxford: Oxford University Press.
- United States House Committee on the Judiciary (1994). Innocence and the Death Penalty: Assessing the Danger of Mistaken Executions. Washington, DC.
- Radelet, Michael, Hugo Adam Bedau et al. (1992). In Spite of Innocence. Boston: Northeastern University Press.
