= Jew Don Boney =

American politician

Jew Don Boney Jr.

Member of the Houston City Council from the D District
- In office January 2, 1996 – January 2, 2002
- Preceded by: Alfred Calloway
- Succeeded by: Ada Edwards

Personal details
- Party: Democratic (council is nonpartisan)
- Occupation: Businessman

Jew Don Boney Jr. (born November 16, 1951) was a member of the Houston, Texas, City Council from 1995 until 2001, representing the historically African-American District D. In addition, he served as Mayor Pro Tem of Houston from 1998 to 2001. He was the Associate Director of the Mickey Leland Center on World Hunger and Peace at Texas Southern University.

== International trade ==
As an international trade facilitator, Boney has visited more than 20 foreign countries including Mexico, England, Ireland, Germany, Italy, the Bahamas, Jamaica, Brazil, Canada, Malawi, South Africa, Mozambique, Zimbabwe, Botswana, Ghana, Nigeria, Togo, Ivory Coast, Ethiopia, and Tanzania and Zanzibar.

Internationally, in the field of global peace and the fight against hunger, Boney participated in the 2002 Congressional Black Caucus Legislative Summit on issues relating to human rights. He also was a delegate to the African/African American Summit in Accra, Ghana. Boney has worked hand in hand with numerous African governments on missions to initiate, facilitate and implement global policy. This included work to secure passage of “The African Growth and Opportunity Act” (AGOA) signed by President Bill Clinton, established the first formalized trade relationship between the U.S. and Africa.

At the request of Ethiopian officials he successfully facilitated the certification of Ethiopia under AGOA. Boney was also asked to co-lead a September 2002 Trade Mission to Addis Ababa, Ethiopia where he was able to successfully facilitate an agreement between the Ethiopian Government and the Food Development Corporation (FDC) to develop an unprecedented food security project projected to build a multimillion-dollar agribusiness complex which is projected to provide food for 100,000 and employ more than 10,000 Ethiopians.

== Community activist ==
During the 1980s, Boney received national notoriety for his activism, which involved organizing the Coalition to Free Clarence Brandley, a multiracial and ecumenical alliance of Houstonians that successfully galvanized international support for Brandley’s release. Brandley was falsely accused of murder and sentenced to death row yet after serving a decade of his life in Huntsville, he was finally exonerated in 1990. “I believe having the opportunity to serve in a capacity that actually helped save a human being's life is the most significant contribution anyone can make”, Boney stated. His activism was depicted in the Showtime movie, Whitewash: The Clarence Brandley Story. He spoke out in the aftermath of the 1998 hate-crime killing of James Byrd Jr. in Jasper, Texas.

== Cultural accomplishments ==
Boney was Chairman of the Board of Directors for the 37th annual Houston International Festival in 2008, with the theme “Out of Africa: The Three Journeys”.

Boney chaired the Legislative and Public Policy Task Force for the Earl Carl Institute at the Thurgood Marshall School of Law at Texas Southern University.

== Family and personal life ==
Boney is the son of the late educator J. Don Boney of Calvert, Texas and Clara Bernice Payne of Houston. He earned his Bachelor of Arts in Speech Communication (magna cum laude), and M.A. in Communications from Texas Southern University (TSU) and an Executive Masters of Public Administration from TSU's Barbara Jordan-Mickey Leland School of Public Affairs. He is a Senior Fellow of the American Leadership Forum.

Boney is the father of three adult children. He is married to Dorca Medina.
