= List of law enforcement agencies in New York =

List of law enforcement agencies in New York may refer to:

- List of law enforcement agencies in New York (state)
- List of law enforcement agencies in New York City
