= List of law enforcement agencies on Long Island =

The List of Long Island law enforcement agencies provides an inclusive list of law enforcement agencies serving Long Island in southeastern New York State. This includes those agencies serving the New York City boroughs of Brooklyn and Queens on the western portion of Long Island, along with those serving the suburban counties of Nassau County and Suffolk County to the east.

== Federal agencies ==
- Administrative Office of the United States Courts
  - Probation and Pretrial Services System
- Amtrak Police Department
- United States Department of Agriculture
  - Forest Service Law Enforcement & Investigations
- United States Department of Defense
  - Army Civilian Police
  - Army Criminal Investigation Command
  - Army Military Police Corps
  - Air Force Office of Special Investigations
  - Air Force Police
  - Naval Criminal Investigative Service
  - Navy Police
- United States Department of Homeland Security
  - Coast Guard
  - Customs and Border Protection (Border Patrol and Office of Field Ops)
  - Federal Air Marshal Service
  - Federal Protective Service
  - Immigration and Customs Enforcement
    - Enforcement and Removal Operations (ERO)
    - Homeland Security Investigations (HSI)
  - Secret Service
  - Transportation Security Administration
- United States Department of the Interior
  - Fish and Wildlife Office of Law Enforcement
  - National Park Service Law Enforcement Rangers
  - United States Park Police
- United States Department of Justice
  - Bureau of Alcohol, Tobacco, Firearms and Explosives
  - Drug Enforcement Administration
  - Federal Bureau of Investigation
    - FBI Police
  - Federal Bureau of Prisons
  - United States Marshals Service
- United States Department of State
  - Diplomatic Security Service
- United States Department of the Treasury
  - Federal Reserve Police
  - IRS Criminal Investigation Division
  - United States Mint Police
- United States Department of Veterans Affairs Police
- United States Environmental Protection Agency Criminal Investigation Division
- United States Postal Inspection Service

== State agencies operating on Long Island ==
- New York State Office of the Attorney General
  - Criminal Justice Division - Investigations
- New York State Police
- New York State Department of Corrections and Community Supervision
  - Correction Officers and Parole Officers
- New York State Court Officers
- New York State Department of Environmental Conservation
  - New York State Department of Environmental Conservation Police
  - New York State Forest Rangers
- New York State Park Police
- New York State Division of Military and Naval Affairs
- New York State Department of Motor Vehicles
  - Division of Field Investigation
- New York State Office of Children and Family Services
  - Bureau of Juvenile Detention Services
- New York State Office of Mental Health Police
- New York State Office for People With Developmental Disabilities Police
- New York State Office of Tax Enforcement
- New York Waterfront Commission Police

== Interstate agencies ==
- Port Authority of New York and New Jersey Police Department (JFK Airport and LGA Airport in Queens)
- Metropolitan Transportation Authority Police Department (Long Island Rail Road)

== New York City ==
- New York City Police Department (Police Officers)
  - New York City Police Department School Safety Division (Special Patrolmen)
- New York City Department of Environmental Protection Police (Police Officers)
- Fire Department of the City of New York Fire Marshals (Police Officers)
- New York City Department of Correction (Peace Officers)
- New York City Department of Probation (Peace Officers)
- New York City Sheriff's Office under the New York City Department of Finance (Peace Officers)
- New York City Administration for Children's Services Police (Special Patrolmen)
- New York City Business Integrity Commission (Special Patrolmen)
- New York City Department of Citywide Administrative Services Police (Special Patrolmen)
- New York City Department of Health and Mental Hygiene Police (Special Patrolmen)
- New York City Department of Health and Hospitals Police (Special Patrolmen)
- New York City Department of Homeless Services Police (Special Patrolmen)
- New York City Human Resources Administration Police (Special Patrolmen)
- New York City Department of Investigation (Special Patrolmen)
- New York City Parks Enforcement Patrol (Special Patrolmen)
- New York City Department of Sanitation Police (Special Patrolmen)
- New York City Taxi and Limousine Commission Police (Special Patrolmen)

The New York City Transit Police and the New York City Housing Authority Police were merged into the NYPD in 1995, the Brooklyn Police Department and the Long Island City Police Department in 1898 and the Town of Morrisania Police Department in 1879.

Each of the five counties of New York City — New York (Manhattan), Bronx, Richmond (Staten Island), Kings (Brooklyn) and Queens — had a county sheriff's office. In 1942 they were merged to form the New York City Sheriff's Office. In 1939, the corrections part of the each county sheriff's office separated and became the consolidated New York City Department of Correction.

== Campus Safety ==
- New York State University Police (Police officers)
- City University of New York Public Safety Department (Public Safety Officers) Brooklyn and Queens CUNY facilities only

== Nassau County ==
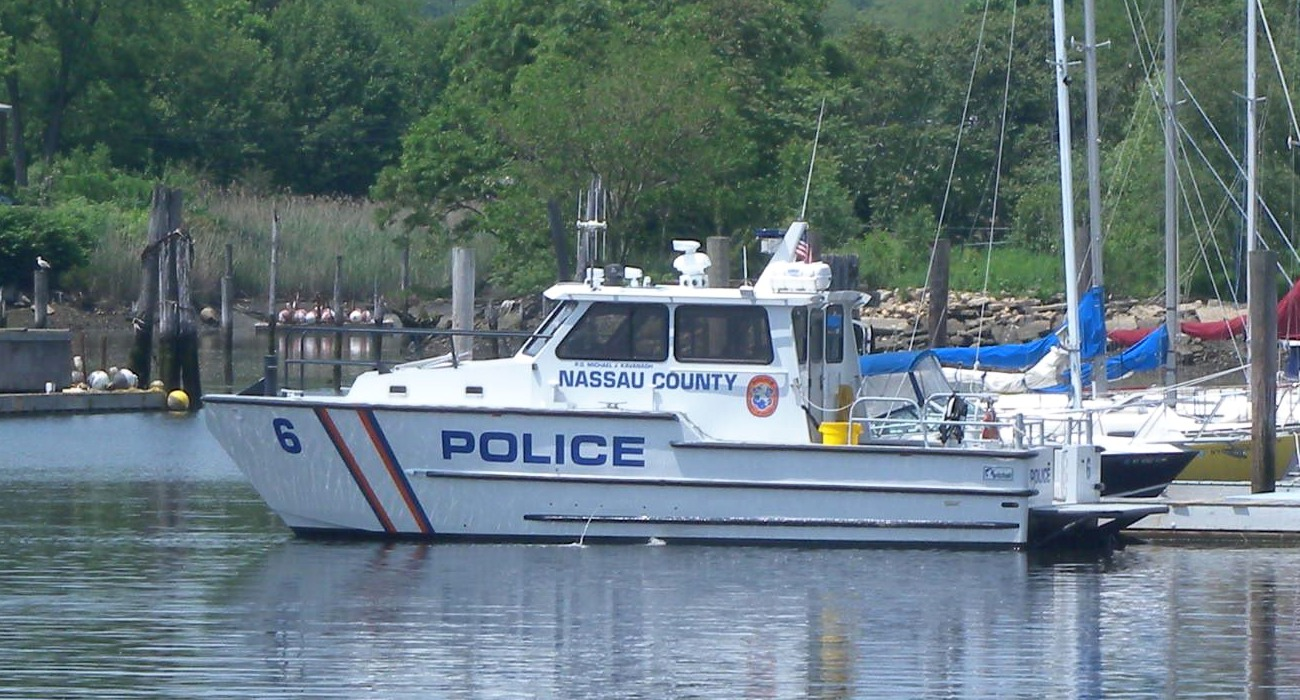
Nassau county police Patrol boat in Port Washington

- Nassau County Police Department
- Nassau County Sheriff's Department (Deputy Sheriffs are police officers; Correction Officers are peace officers)
- Nassau County Probation Department (Peace Officers)
- Nassau County Fire Marshals (Peace Officers)
- Nassau County SPCA (Peace Officers)
- Nassau County Auxiliary Police (Peace Officers)
- Brookville Police Department
- Centre Island Police Department
- Floral Park Police Department
- Freeport Police Department
- Garden City Police Department
- Glen Cove Police Department
- Glen Cove Harbor Patrol (Peace Officers)
- Great Neck Estates Police Department
- Hempstead Village Police Department
- Kensington Police Department
- Kings Point Police Department
- Lake Success Police Department
- Long Beach Police Department
- Lynbrook Police Department
- Malverne Police Department
- Muttontown–Upper Brookville Police Department
- Old Westbury Police Department
- Old Brookville Police Department
- Port Washington Police District
- Oyster Bay Cove Police Department
- Rockville Centre Police Department
- Sands Point Police Department
- Town of Hempstead Bay Constables (Peace Officers)
- Town of North Hempstead Bay Constables (Peace Officers)
- Town of Oyster Bay Bay Constables (Peace Officers)

== Suffolk County ==
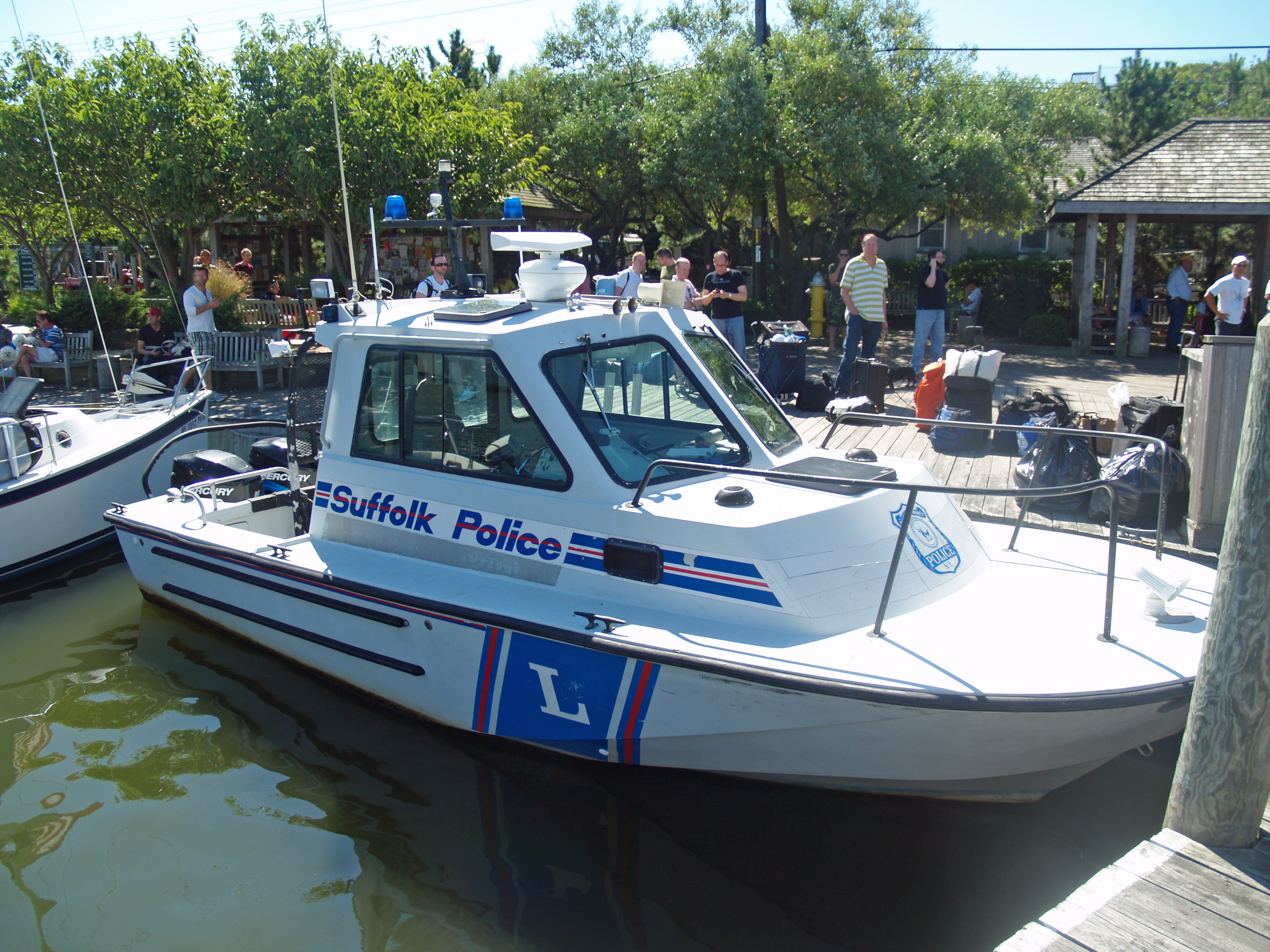
A Suffolk County Police boat

- Suffolk County Police Department
- Suffolk County Sheriff's Office (Deputy Sheriffs are police officers. Correction Officers are peace officers)
- Suffolk County Probation Department (Peace Officer)
- Suffolk County Fire Marshals (peace officers)
- Suffolk County SPCA (peace officers)
- Asharoken Police Department
- Amityville Police Department
- Babylon Village Code Enforcement (peace officers)
- Belle Terre Village Constables (peace officers)
- East Hampton Town Marine Patrol
- East Hampton Town Police Department
- East Hampton Village Police Department
- Fisher's Island Constables (peace officers)
- Head of the Harbor Police Department
- Huntington Bay Police Department
- Lloyd Harbor Police Department
- Long Island MacArthur Airport Law Enforcement (peace officers)
- Nissequogue Police Department
- Northport Police Department
- Ocean Beach Police Department
- Old Field Village Constables (peace officers)
- Port Jefferson Village Constables Bureau (peace officers)
- Poquott Village Constables (peace officers)
- Patchogue Village Constables (peace officers)
- Quogue Police Department
- Riverhead Town Police Department
- Sag Harbor Police Department
- Saltaire Police Department
- Shelter Island Town Police Department
- Southampton Town Bay Constables
- Southampton Town Police Department
- Southampton Village Police Department
- Southold Town Police Department
- Town of Babylon Bay Constable's Office (peace officers)
- Town of Babylon Fire Marshal's Office (peace officers)
- Town of Babylon Park Rangers (peace officers)
- Town of Brookhaven Fire Marshals (peace officers)
- Town of Brookhaven Park Rangers (peace officers)
- Town of Brookhaven Harbormaster/Bay Constables (peace officers)
- Town of Islip Fire Marshal's Office (peace officers)
- Town of Islip Harbor Police (peace officers)
- Town of Islip Park Rangers (peace officers)
- Town of Huntington Harbormaster/Bay Constables (peace officers)
- Town of Huntington Park Rangers (peace officers)
- Town of Smithtown Department of Public Safety (peace officers)
- Westhampton Beach Police Department
- Westhampton Dunes Village Constables (peace officers)

== Disbanded Agencies ==
=== State agencies ===
- Long Island Rail Road Police (merged into Metropolitan Transportation Authority Police in 1997)
- Long Island State Parkway Police (merged into New York State Police and New York State Park Police in 1980)

=== New York City agencies ===
- ASPCA Humane Law Enforcement Division (disbanded in 2013)
- New York City Transit Police (merged into the NYPD in 1995)
- New York City Housing Authority Police (merged into the NYPD in 1995)

=== Nassau County Agencies ===
- Cedarhurst Police Department (merged into Nassau County Police Department)
- Cove Neck Police Department (merged into Old Brookville Police Department)
- Farmingdale Village Police Department (merged into Nassau County Police Department in 1942)
- Lattingtown Police Department (merged into Nassau County Police Department)
- Laurel Hollow Police Department (merged into Nassau County Police Department – RMP 223)
- Lawrence Police Department (merged into Nassau County Police Department)
- North Hills Police Department (merged into Nassau County Police Department)
- Oyster Bay Police Department (merged into Nassau County Police Department)
- Plandome Police Department (merged into Nassau County Police Department in 1975)
- Roosevelt Police Department (merged into Nassau County Police Department)
- Sea Cliff Police Department (merged into Nassau County Police Department)
- Stewart Manor Police Department (merged into Nassau County Police Department)
- Valley Stream Police Department (merged into Nassau County Police Department)
- Woodmere Police Department (merged into Nassau County Police Department)
- Woodsburgh Police Department (merged into Nassau County Police Department)

=== Suffolk County agencies ===
- Babylon Town Police Department (merged into Suffolk County Police Department in 1960)
- Babylon Village Police Department (merged into Suffolk County Police Department in 1960)
- Lindenhurst Police Department (merged into Suffolk County Police Department in 1960)
- Brookhaven Town Police Department (merged into Suffolk County Police Department in 1960)
- Patchogue Village Police Department (merged into Suffolk County Police Department in 1960)
- Islip Town Police Department (merged into Suffolk County Police Department in 1960)
- Brightwaters Police Department (merged into Suffolk County Police Department in 1960)
- Huntington Town Police Department (merged into Suffolk County Police Department in 1960)
- Smithtown Town Police Department (merged into Suffolk County Police Department in 1960)
- Suffolk County Park Rangers (merged into Suffolk County Park Police in 1991)
- Greenport Village Police Department (absorbed by Southold Town Police Department in 1994)
- Hampton Bays Police Department (merged into Southampton Town Police Department in 19??)
- Suffolk County Park Police (merged into Suffolk County Police Department in 2014)

== See also ==
- List of law enforcement agencies in New York (state)
- Law enforcement in New York City
- Law enforcement in Westchester County
