= STPD =

STPD is an abbreviation for:

== Police Departments ==
- Southold Town Police Department
- Southampton Town Police Department
- Sor-Trondelag Police District, Trondheim, Norway

== Other ==
- SCSI Pass-Through Direct
- Short ton per day
- Schizotypal personality disorder
- STPD, the Indian Railways station code for Sitaphalmandi railway station, Hyderabad, Telangana, India
