= Amityville Police Department (New York) =

Municipal police force of New York

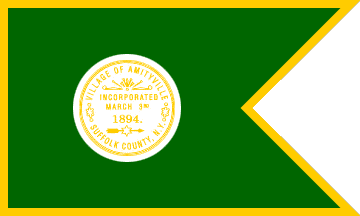
- Flag
- Common name: Amityville PD
- Abbreviation: AVPD

Agency overview
- Formed: March 3, 1894; 132 years ago

Jurisdictional structure
- Operations jurisdiction: Amityville, New York
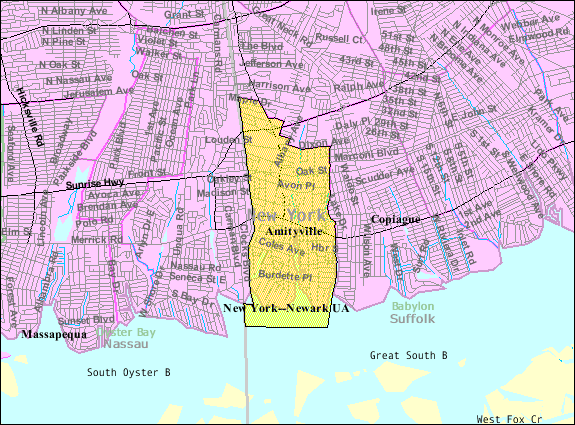
- Map of the Amityville Police Department's jurisdiction

Operational structure
- Headquarters: 21 Ireland Place, Amityville, NY 11701
- Sworn Officers: 26
- Elected officer responsible: Dennis M. Siry
- Agency executive: Frank Caramanica, Chief of Police
- Parent agency: Incorporated Village of Amityville, New York

Website
- Official website

The Amityville Police Department (colloquially known as the Amityville Police) is a municipal police department serving the Incorporated Village of Amityville, in Suffolk County, New York, United States.

The AVPD is an accredited law enforcement agency within the United States, with 26 full time officers.

== History ==
The mission of the department is to “enhance the quality of life in our village by working in partnership with the community and in accordance with the constitutional rights to enforce laws, preserve the peace, reduce fear and provide a safe environment for the residents and persons passing through.”

In 1994, during the village's centennial, the municipal building was modernized and renamed the William J. Kay Memorial Building, in honor of the former Chief of Department.

In 2012, the Amityville Police Department promoted officer Pam Slack to the role of sergeant. Slack – who joined the village's police force in 1994 and was, at the time, its only female officer – became the first woman to serve in that capacity.

In 2024, the police department officially became accredited by the State of New York. At the time, it was one of only 68 throughout the state to hold the Law Enforcement Agency Accreditation .

== Ranks and Insignia ==
Title	Insignia
Chief	
Lieutenant	
Sergeant	
Detective	
Police Officer	

== See also ==
- List of law enforcement agencies on Long Island, New York
- List of law enforcement agencies in New York (state)
