= List of law enforcement agencies in New York (state) =

Flag of the State of New York

As of 2025, there were 528 law enforcement agencies in New York State employing 68,810 police officers, some agencies employ peace / Special Patrolmen (about 352 for each 100,000 residents) according to the US Bureau of Justice Statistics' Census of State and Local Law Enforcement Agencies.

== State agencies ==
- New York State Office of the Attorney General
  - Criminal Justice Division - Investigations
- New York State Police
- New York State Department of Corrections and Community Supervision
  - Correction Officers and Parole Officers
- New York State Court Officers
- New York State Department of Environmental Conservation
  - New York State Department of Environmental Conservation Police
  - New York State Forest Rangers
- New York State Park Police
- New York State Division of Military and Naval Affairs
- New York State Department of Motor Vehicles
  - Division of Field Investigation
- New York State Office of Cannabis Management
  - New York State Cannabis Enforcement Division
- New York State Office of Children and Family Services
  - Bureau of Juvenile Detention Services
- New York State Office of Mental Health Police
- New York State Office for People With Developmental Disabilities Police
- New York State Office of Tax Enforcement
- New York Waterfront Commission Police

== Interstate agencies ==
- Palisades Interstate Parkway Police Department (New York State & New Jersey)
- Port Authority of New York and New Jersey Police Department (New York State & New Jersey)
- Metropolitan Transportation Authority Police Department (New York State & Connecticut)

== County agencies ==
- Albany County
  - Albany County Sheriff's Department
  - Albany County District Attorney's Office
  - Albany County Probation Department
- Allegany County
  - Allegany County Sheriff's Office
  - Allegany County District Attorney's Office
  - Allegany County Probation Department
- Broome County
  - Broome County Sheriff's Office
  - Broome County District Attorney's Office
  - Broome County Probation Department
- Cattaraugus County
  - Cattaraugus County Sheriff's Office
  - Cattaraugus County District Attorney's Office
  - Cattaraugus County Probation Department
- Cayuga County
  - Cayuga County Sheriff's Office
  - Cayuga County District Attorney's Office
  - Cayuga County Probation Department
- Chautauqua County
  - Chautauqua County Sheriff's Office
  - Chautauqua County District Attorney's Office
  - Chautauqua County Probation Department
- Chemung County
  - Chemung County Sheriff's Office
  - Chemung County District Attorney's Office
  - Chemung County Probation Department
- Chenango County
  - Chenango County Sheriff's Office
  - Chenango County District Attorney's Office
  - Chenango County Probation Department
- Clinton County
  - Clinton County Sheriff's Department
  - Clinton County District Attorney's Office
  - Clinton County Probation Department
- Columbia County
  - Columbia County Sheriff's Office
  - Columbia County District Attorney's Office
  - Columbia County Probation Department
- Cortland County
  - Cortland County Sheriff's Office
  - Cortland County District Attorney's Office
  - Cortland County Probation Department
- Delaware County
  - Delaware County Sheriff's Office
  - Delaware County District Attorney's Office
  - Delaware County Probation Department
- Dutchess County
  - Dutchess County Sheriff's Office
  - Dutchess County District Attorney's Office
  - Dutchess County Probation Department
- Erie County
  - Erie County, New York Sheriff's Office
  - Erie County District Attorney's Office
  - Erie County Probation Department
  - Erie County S.P.C.A Law Enforcement
- Essex County
  - Essex County Sheriff's Office
  - Essex County District Attorney's Office
  - Essex County Probation Department
- Franklin County
  - Franklin County Sheriff's Office
  - Franklin County District Attorney's Office
  - Franklin County Probation Department
- Fulton County
  - Fulton County Sheriff's Department
  - Fulton County District Attorney's Office
  - Fulton County Probation Department
- Genesee County
  - Genesee County Sheriff's Office
  - Genesee County District Attorney's Office
  - Genesee County Probation Department
- Greene County
  - Greene County Sheriff's Office
  - Greene County District Attorney's Office
  - Greene County Probation Department
- Hamilton County
  - Hamilton County Sheriff's Office
  - Hamilton County District Attorney's Office
  - Hamilton County Probation Department
- Herkimer County
  - Herkimer County Sheriff's Office
  - Herkimer County District Attorney's Office
  - Herkimer County Probation Department
- Jefferson County
  - Jefferson County Sheriff's Office
  - Jefferson County District Attorney's Office
  - Jefferson County Probation Department
- Lewis County
  - Lewis County Sheriff's Office
  - Lewis County District Attorney's Office
  - Lewis County Probation Department
- Livingston County
  - Livingston County Sheriff's Office
  - Livingston County District Attorney's Office
  - Livingston County Probation Department
- Madison County
  - Madison County Sheriff's Office
  - Madison County District Attorney's Office
  - Madison County Probation Department
- Monroe County
  - Monroe County Sheriff's Office
  - Monroe County District Attorney's Office
  - Monroe County Probation & Community Corrections
- Montgomery County
  - Montgomery County Sheriff's Office
  - Montgomery County District Attorney's Office
  - Montgomery County Probation Department
- Nassau County
  - Nassau County Police Department
  - Nassau County Sheriff's Department
  - Nassau County District Attorney's Office
  - Nassau County Probation Department
- Niagara County
  - Niagara County Sheriff's Department
  - Niagara County District Attorney's Office
  - Niagara County Probation Department
  - Niagara County S.P.C.A Law Enforcement
- Oneida County
  - Oneida County Sheriff's Office
  - Oneida County District Attorney's Office
  - Oneida County Probation Department
- Onondaga County
  - Onondaga County Sheriff's Office
  - Onondaga County District Attorney's Office
  - Onondaga County Probation Department
- Ontario County
  - Ontario County Sheriff's Office
  - Ontario County District Attorney's Office
  - Ontario County Probation Department
- Orange County
  - Orange County Sheriff's Office
  - Orange County District Attorney's Office
  - Orange County Probation Department
- Orleans County
  - Orleans County Sheriff's Office
  - Orleans County District Attorney's Office
  - Orleans County Probation Department
- Oswego County
  - Oswego County Sheriff's Office
  - Oswego County District Attorney's Office
  - Oswego County Probation Department
- Otsego County
  - Otsego County Sheriff's Office
  - Otsego County District Attorney's Office
  - Otsego County Probation Department
- Putnam County
  - Putnam County Sheriff's Department
  - Putnam County District Attorney's Office
  - Putnam County Probation Department
- Rensselaer County
  - Rensselaer County Sheriff's Department
  - Rensselaer County District Attorney's Office
  - Rensselaer County Probation Department
- Rockland County
  - Rockland County Sheriff's Department
  - Rockland County District Attorney's Office
  - Rockland County Probation Department
- Saratoga County
  - Saratoga County Sheriff's Office
  - Saratoga County District Attorney's Office
  - Saratoga County Probation Department
- Schenectady County
  - Schenectady County Sheriff's Office
  - Schenectady County District Attorney's Office
  - Schenectady County Probation Department
- Schoharie County
  - Schoharie County Sheriff's Office
  - Schoharie County District Attorney's Office
  - Schoharie County Probation Department
- Schuyler County
  - Schuyler County Sheriff's Office
  - Schuyler County District Attorney's Office
  - Schuyler County Probation Department
- Seneca County
  - Seneca County Sheriff's Office
  - Seneca County District Attorney's Office
  - Seneca County Probation Department
- Steuben County
  - Steuben County Sheriff's Office
  - Steuben County District Attorney's Office
  - Steuben County Probation Department
- St. Lawrence County
  - St. Lawrence County Sheriff's Office
  - St. Lawrence County District Attorney's Office
  - St. Lawrence County Probation Department
- Suffolk County
  - Suffolk County Police Department
  - Suffolk County Sheriff's Office
  - Suffolk County District Attorney's Office
  - Suffolk County Probation Department
- Sullivan County
  - Sullivan County Sheriff's Office
  - Sullivan County District Attorney's Office
  - Sullivan County Probation Department
- Tioga County
  - Tioga County Sheriff's Office
  - Tioga County District Attorney's Office
  - Tioga County Probation Department
- Tompkins County
  - Tompkins County Sheriff's Office
  - Tompkins County District Attorney's Office
  - Tompkins County Probation Department
- Ulster County
  - Ulster County Sheriff's Office
  - Ulster County District Attorney's Office
  - Ulster County Probation Department
- Warren County
  - Warren County Sheriff's Office
  - Warren County District Attorney's Office
  - Warren County Probation Department
- Washington County
  - Washington County Sheriff's Office
  - Washington County District Attorney's Office
  - Washington County Probation Department
- Wayne County
  - Wayne County Sheriff's Office
  - Wayne County District Attorney's Office
  - Wayne County Probation Department
- Westchester County
  - Westchester County Department of Public Safety
  - Westchester County Department of Correction
  - Westchester County District Attorney's Office
  - Westchester County Probation Department
- Wyoming County
  - Wyoming County Sheriff's Office
  - Wyoming County District Attorney's Office
  - Wyoming County Probation Department
- Yates County
  - Yates County Sheriff's Office
  - Yates County District Attorney's Office
  - Yates County Probation Department

=== New York City District Attorneys ===
- Bronx County
  - Bronx County District Attorney's Office
- Richmond County (Staten Island)
  - Richmond County District Attorney's Office
- Kings County (Brooklyn)
  - Kings County District Attorney's Office
- Queens County
  - Queens County District Attorney's Office
- New York County (Manhattan)
  - New York County District Attorney's Office
- New York City
  - Office of the Special Narcotics Prosecutor for the City of New York

== New York City Agencies ==
- New York City Police Department (Police Officers)
  - New York City Police Department School Safety Division (Special Patrolmen)
- New York City Department of Environmental Protection Police (Police Officers)
- Fire Department of the City of New York Fire Marshals (Police Officers)
- New York City Department of Correction (Peace Officers)
- New York City Department of Probation (Peace Officers)
- New York City Sheriff's Office under the New York City Department of Finance (Peace Officers)
- New York City Administration for Children's Services Police (Special Officer)
- New York City Business Integrity Commission (Special Patrolmen)
- New York City Department of Citywide Administrative Services Police (Special Officer)
- New York City Department of Health and Mental Hygiene Police (Special Officer)
- New York City Department of Health and Hospitals Police (Special Officer)
- New York City Department of Homeless Services Police (Special Officer)
- New York City Human Resources Administration Police (Special Officer)
- New York City Department of Investigation (Special Patrolmen)
- New York City Parks Enforcement Patrol (Special Officer)
- New York City Department of Sanitation Police (Special Patrolmen)
- New York City Taxi and Limousine Commission Police (Special Patrolmen)

== Municipal agencies ==
The following are municipal police departments outside of New York City. In New York, it is common for multiple municipal governments to have the same name. In these cases, the specific municipality is specified in parentheses after the department name.

- Adams Police Department (Village of Adams)
- Addison Police Department (Village of Addison)
- Afton Police Department (Village of Afton)
- Akron Police Department
- Albany Police Department (New York)
- Albion Police Department (Village of Albion)
- Alexandria Bay Village Police Department
- Alfred Police Department (Village of Alfred)
- Allegany Police Department (Village of Allegany)
- Altamont Police Department
- Amherst Police Department
- Amityville Police Department
- Amsterdam Police Department (City of Amsterdam)
- Andover Police Department (Village of Andover)
- Angelica Police Department (Village of Angelica)
- Antwerp Police Department (Village of Antwerp)
- Arcade Police Department (Village of Arcade)
- Ardsley Police Department
- Asharoken Police Department
- Athens Police Department (Village of Athens)
- Attica Police Department (Village of Attica)
- Auburn Police Department
- Avon Police Department (Village of Avon)
- Bainbridge Police Department (Village of Bainbridge)
- Baldwinsville Police Department
- Ballston Spa Police Department
- Batavia Police Department (City of Batavia)
- Bath Police Department (Village of Bath)
- Beacon Police Department
- Bedford Police Department
- Belmont Police Department
- Bethlehem Police Department
- Binghamton Police Department (City of Binghamton)
- Black River Police Department
- Blasdell Police Department
- Blooming Grove Police Department
- Bolivar Police Department (Village of Bolivar)
- Bolton Police Department
- Boonville Police Department (Village of Boonville)
- Brant Police Department
- Brewster Police Department
- Briarcliff Manor Police Department
- Brighton Police Department
- Broadalbin Police Department (Village of Broadalbin)
- Brockport Police Department
- Bronxville Police Department
- Brownville Police Department (Village of Brownville)
- Buchanan Police Department
- Buffalo Police Department
- Cairo Police Department
- Caledonia Police Department (Village of Caledonia)
- Cambridge-Greenwich Police Department (Villages of Cambridge and Greenwich)
- Camden Police Department (Village of Camden)
- Camillus Police Department (Town of Camillus and Village of Camillus)
- Canajoharie Police Department (Town of Canajoharie)
- Canandaigua Police Department (City of Canandaigua)
- Canastota Police Department
- Candor Police Department
- Canisteo Police Department (Village of Canisteo)
- Canton Police Department
- Cape Vincent Police Department (Village of Cape Vincent)
- Carmel Police Department
- Carroll Police Department
- Carthage Police Department
- Caton Town Constabulary
- Catskill Police Department (Village of Catskill)
- Cattaraugus Police Department
- Cayuga Heights Police Department
- Cazenovia Police Department (Village of Cazenovia)
- Central Square Police Department
- Centre Island Police Department
- Chatham Police Department (Village of Chatham)
- Cheektowaga Police Department
- Chester Police Department (Town of Chester)
- Chester Police Department (Village of Chester)
- Chittenango Police Department
- Cicero Police Department
- Clarkstown Police Department
- Clayton Police Department (Village of Clayton)
- Clifton Springs Police Department
- Clyde Police Department
- Cobleskill Police Department (Village of Cobleskill)
- Coeymans Police Department
- Cohocton Police Department (Town of Cohocton)
- Cohoes Police Department
- Colchester Police Department
- Cold Spring Police Department
- Colonie Police Department (Town of Colonie)
- Cooperstown Police Department
- Corfu Police Department
- Corning Police Department (City of Corning)
- Cornwall Police Department
- Cornwall-on-Hudson Police Department
- Cortland Police Department
- Coxsackie Police Department (Village of Coxsackie)
- Crawford Police Department
- Croton-on-Hudson Police Department
- Cuba Police Department (Town of Cuba)
- Cambria Constables (Town of Cambria)
- Dansville Police Department
- DeWitt Police Department
- Deerpark Police Department
- Delhi Police Department (Village of Delhi)
- Depew Police Department
- Deposit Police Department (Village of Deposit)
- Dexter Police Department
- Dobbs Ferry Police Department
- Dolgeville Police Department
- Dryden Police Department (Village of Dryden)
- Dunkirk Police Department (City of Dunkirk)
- Durham Police Department
- East Aurora Police Department (Village of East Aurora and Town of Aurora)
- East Fishkill Police Department
- East Greenbush Police Department
- East Hampton Police Department (Town of East Hampton)
- East Hampton Police Department (Village of East Hampton)
- East Rochester Police Department (Village of East Rochester)
- Eastchester Police Department
- Eden Police Department
- Ellenville Police Department
- Ellicott Police Department
- Ellicottville Police Department (Town of Ellicottville)
- Elmira Police Department (City of Elmira)
- Elmira Police Department (Town of Elmira)
- Elmira Heights Police Department
- Elmsford Police Department
- Endicott Police Department
- Evans Police Department
- Fairport Police Department
- Fallsburg Police Department
- Fishkill Police Department (Town of Fishkill)
- Fishkill Police Department (Village of Fishkill)
- Floral Park Police Department
- Florida Police Department
- Fort Plain Police Department
- Frankfort Police Department (Town of Frankfort)
- Frankfort Police Department (Village of Frankfort)
- Franklinville Police Department (Village of Franklinville)
- Fredonia Police Department
- Freeport Police Department
- Friendship Police Department
- Fulton Police Department
- Garden City Police Department
- Gates Police Department
- Geddes Police Department
- Geneseo Police Department (Village of Geneseo)
- Geneva Police Department (City of Geneva)
- Glen Cove Police Department
- Glen Park Police Department
- Glens Falls Police Department
- Glenville Police Department
- Gloversville Police Department
- Goshen Police Department (Town of Goshen)
- Goshen Police Department (Village of Goshen)
- Gouverneur Police Department (Village of Gouverneur)
- Gowanda Police Department
- Grand Island Police Department
- Granville Police Department (Village of Granville)
- Great Neck Estates Police Department
- Greece Police Department
- Green Island Police Department (Village of Green Island)
- Greenburgh Police Department
- Greene Police Department (Village of Greene)
- Greenport Police Department
- Greenwood Lake Police Department
- Groton Police Department (Village of Groton)
- Guilderland Police Department
- Hamburg Police Department (Town of Hamburg)
- Hamburg Police Department (Village of Hamburg)
- Hamilton Police Department (Village of Hamilton)
- Hammondsport Police Department
- Hancock Police Department (Village of Hancock)
- Harriman Police Department
- Harrison Police Department (Town of Harrison)
- Hastings-on-Hudson Police Department
- Holland Constables (Town of Holland)
- Haverstraw Police Department (Town of Haverstraw)
- Head of the Harbor Police Department
- Hempstead Police Department (Village of Hempstead)
- Herkimer Police Department (Village of Herkimer)
- Highland Falls Police Department
- Highland Town Constabulary (Town of Highland Constables)
- Highlands Police Department
- Holley Police Department
- Homer Police Department (Village of Homer)
- Hoosick Falls Police Department
- Hornell Police Department
- Horseheads Police Department (Village of Horseheads)
- Hudson Police Department
- Hudson Falls Police Department
- Hunter Police Department (Town of Hunter)
- Huntington Bay Police Department
- Hyde Park Police Department
- Ilion Police Department
- Independence Police Department
- Inlet Police Department
- Interlaken Police Department
- Irondequoit Police Department
- Irvington Police Department
- Ithaca Police Department (City of Ithaca)
- Jamestown Police Department
- Johnson City Police Department
- Johnstown Police Department (City of Johnstown)
- Jordan Police Department
- Kenmore Police Department
- Kensington Police Department
- Kent Police Department
- Kings Point Police Department
- Kingston Police Department (City of Kingston)
- Kirkland Police Department
- Lackawanna Police Department
- Lake Placid Police Department
- Lake Success Police Department
- Lakewood-Busti Police Department (Town of Busti and Village of Lakewood)
- Lancaster Police Department (Town of Lancaster)
- Larchmont Police Department
- Le Roy Police Department (Village of Le Roy)
- Lewisboro Police Department
- Lewiston Police Department (Town of Lewiston)
- Liberty Police Department (Village of Liberty)
- Little Falls Police Department (City of Little Falls)
- Liverpool Police Department
- Lloyd Police Department
- Lloyd Harbor Police Department
- Lockport Police Department (City of Lockport)
- Long Beach Police Department
- Lowville Police Department (Village of Lowville)
- Lynbrook Police Department]
- Macedon Police Department
- Malone Police Department (Village of Malone)
- Malverne Police Department
- Mamaroneck Police Department (Town of Mamaroneck)
- Mamaroneck Police Department (Village of Mamaroneck)
- Manchester Police Department (Village of Manchester
- Manlius Police Department (Town of Manlius)
- Marcellus Police Department (Village of Marcellus)
- Margaretville Police Department
- Marlborough Police Department
- Massena Police Department (Village of Massena)
- Maybrook Police Department
- McGraw Police Department
- Mechanicville Police Department
- Medina Police Department
- Menands Police Department
- Middleport Police Department
- Middletown Police Department
- Millbrook Police Department
- Millerton Police Department
- Mohawk Police Department
- Monroe Police Department (Village of Monroe)
- Montgomery Police Department (Town of Montgomery)
- Montgomery Police Department (Village of Montgomery)
- Monticello Police Department
- Moravia Police Department (Village of Moravia)
- Moriah Police Department
- Mount Hope Police Department
- Mount Morris Police Department (Village of Mount Morris)
- Mount Pleasant Police Department
- Mount Vernon Police Department
- Muttontown Police Department
- Nassau Police Department (Village of Nassau)
- New Berlin Police Department (Town of New Berlin)
- New Castle Police Department
- New Hartford Police Department (Town of New Hartford)
- New Paltz Police Department (Town of New Platz and Village of New Paltz)
- New Rochelle Police Department
- New Windsor Police Department
- New York Mills Police Department
- Newark Police Department
- Newburgh Police Department (City of Newburgh)
- Newburgh Police Department (Town of Newburgh)
- Niagara Police Department (Town of Niagara)
- Niagara Falls Police Department (City of Niagara Falls)
- Niskayuna Police Department
- Nissequogue Police Department
- Norfolk Police Department
- North Castle Police Department
- North Greenbush Police Department
- North Hornell Police Department
- North Salem Police Department
- North Syracuse Police Department
- North Tonawanda Police Department
- Northport Police Department
- Northville Police Department
- Norwich Police Department (City of Norwich)
- Norwood Police Department
- Newfane Constables
- Nunda Police Department (Town of Nunda and Village of Nunda)
- North Collins Police Department
- Ocean Beach Police Department
- Ogden Police Department
- Ogdensburg Police Department
- Old Brookville Police Department
- Old Westbury Police Department
- Olean Police Department (City of Olean)
- Olive Police Department
- Oneida Police Department
- Oneonta Police Department (City of Oneonta)
- Orangetown Police Department
- Orchard Park Police Department (Town of Orchard Park)
- Oriskany Police Department
- Ossining Police Department (Town of Ossining)
- Ossining Police Department (Village of Ossining)
- Oswego Police Department (City of Oswego)
- Owego Police Department (Village of Owego)
- Oxford Police Department
- Oyster Bay Cove Police Department
- Painted Post Police Department
- Palmyra Police Department (Village of Palmyra)
- Peekskill Police Department
- Pelham Police Department (Village of Pelham)
- Pelham Manor Police Department
- Penn Yan Police Department
- Perry Police Department (Village of Perry)
- Phelps Police Department (Village of Phelps)
- Philadelphia Police Department (Village of Philadelphia)
- Philmont Police Department
- Phoenix Police Department
- Piermont Police Department
- Pine Plains Police Department
- Plattekill Police Department
- Plattsburgh Police Department (City of Plattsburgh)
- Pleasantville Police Department
- Port Byron Police Department
- Port Chester Police Department
- Port Dickinson Police Department
- Port Jervis Police Department
- Port Washington Police District (Hamlet of Port Washington and the Villages of Port Washington North & Baxter Estates)
- Portville Police Department (Village of Portville)
- Potsdam Police Department (Village of Potsdam)
- Poughkeepsie Police Department (City of Poughkeepsie)
- Poughkeepsie Police Department (Town of Poughkeepsie)
- Pound Ridge Police Department
- Plandome Police Department
- Pulaski Police Department
- Quogue Police Department
- Ramapo Police Department
- Red Hook Police Department (Village of Red Hook)
- Rensselaer Police Department
- Rhinebeck Police Department (Village of Rhinebeck)
- Riverhead Police Department
- Rochester Police Department
- Rockville Centre Police Department
- Rome Police Department
- Rosendale Police Department
- Rotterdam Police Department
- Rushford Police Department
- Rye Police Department (City of Rye)
- Rye Brook Police Department
- Sacketts Harbor Police Department
- Sag Harbor Police Department
- Salamanca Police Department (City of Salamanca)
- Sands Point Police Department
- Saranac Lake Police Department
- Saratoga Springs Police Department
- Saugerties Police Department (Town of Saugerties)
- Scarsdale Police Department (Village of Scarsdale)
- Schenectady Police Department
- Schodack Police Department
- Schoharie Police Department (Village of Schoharie)
- Scotia Police Department
- Seneca Falls Police Department
- Shandaken Police Department
- Shawangunk Police Department
- Shelter Island Police Department
- Sherburne Police Department (Village of Sherburne)
- Sherrill Police Department
- Sidney Police Department (Village of Sidney)
- Silver Creek Police Department
- Skaneateles Police Department (Village of Skaneateles)
- Sleepy Hollow Police Department
- Sodus Police Department (Village of Sodus)
- Sodus Point Police Department
- Solvay Police Department
- Somers Police Department
- South Glens Falls Police Department
- South Nyack-Grand View Police Department (Villages of South Nyack and Grand View-on-Hudson)
- Southampton Police Department (Town of Southampton)
- Southampton Police Department (Village of Southampton)
- Southold Police Department
- Southport Police Department
- Spencer Police Department (Village of Spencer)
- Spring Valley Police Department
- St. Johnsville Police Department (Village of St. Johnsville)
- Stillwater Police Department (Town of Stillwater)
- Stockport Police Department
- Somerset Police Department
- Stony Point Police Department
- Suffern Police Department
- Springville Police Department
- Syracuse Police Department
- Tarrytown Police Department
- Theresa Police Department (Village of Theresa)
- The Town of Rochester Constable
- Ticonderoga Police Department
- Tonawanda Police Department (City of Tonawanda)
- Tonawanda Police Department (Town of Tonawanda)
- Troy Police Department *Town of Camel Police Department (New York)
- Trumansburg Police Department
- Tuckahoe Police Department
- Tupper Lake Police Department (Village of Tupper Lake)
- Tuxedo Police
- Tuxedo Park Police Department
- Ulster Police Department
- Utica Police Department
- Vernon Police Department (Village of Vernon)
- Vestal Police Department
- Valley Stream Police Department
- Walden Police Department
- Wallkill Police Department
- Walton Police Department (Village of Walton)
- Wappingers Falls Police Department
- Warsaw Police Department (Village of Warsaw)
- Warwick Police Department (Town of Warwick)
- Washingtonville Police Department
- Waterford Police Department (Town of Waterford and Village of Waterford)
- Waterloo Police Department (Village of Waterloo)
- Watertown Police Department (City of Watertown)
- Watervliet Police Department
- Watkins Glen Police Department
- Waverly Police Department
- Wayland Police Department (Village of Wayland)
- Webb Police Department
- Webster Police Department (Town of Webster)
- Weedsport Police Department
- Wellsville Police Department (Village of Wellsville)
- West Carthage Police Department
- West Seneca Police Department
- Westfield Constables (Town of Wheatfield)
- Westhampton Beach Police Department
- Willing Police Department
- Windham Police Department
- White Plains Police Department
- Whitesboro Police Department
- Whitestown Police Department
- Windham Police Department
- Wolcott Police Department (Village of Wolcott)
- Woodbury Police Department (Town of Woodbury)
- Woodridge Police Department
- Woodstock Police Department
- Yonkers Police Department
- Yorktown Police Department
- Yorkville Police Department
- Youngstown Police Department

== College and university agencies ==
Public colleges and universities

- New York State University Police
- City University of New York Public Safety Department
- Cayuga Community College Office of Public Safety Campus Police
- Erie Community College Office of College Safety
- Finger Lakes Community College Campus Police Department
- Fulton-Montgomery Community College Department of Public Safety
- Genesee Community College Office of Campus Safety
- Herkimer College Department of Campus Safety
- Hudson Valley Community College Department of Public Safety
- Monroe Community College Department of Public Safety
- Mohawk Valley Community College Department of Public Safety
- Onondaga Community College Department of Campus Safety and Security
- SUNY Niagara Campus Police Department
- SUNY Adirondack Office of Public Safety
- SUNY Broome Community College Office of Public Safety
- SUNY Corning Community College Department of Public Safety
- SUNY Ulster Office of Public Safety & Security
- Tompkins Cortland Community College Campus Police Department

Private colleges and universities

- Cornell University Police Department
- Hofstra University Department of Public Safety
- Ithaca College Office of Public Safety and Emergency Management
- Rensselaer Polytechnic Institute Department of Public Safety
- Syracuse University Department of Public Safety
- Union College Department of Campus Safety
- University of Rochester Department of Public Safety

Agencies marked with a "∗" possess limited powers on their campuses under NYS Education Law, Article 129-A,§6435

== Native American agencies ==
- Cayuga Nation Police Department
- Oneida Indian Nation Police Department
- St. Regis Mohawk Tribal Police Department
- Seneca Nation Marshal's Office
- Seneca Nation of Indians Fish and Wildlife Department

== Federal agencies ==
- Administrative Office of the United States Courts
  - Probation and Pretrial Services System
- Amtrak Police Department
- United States Department of Agriculture
  - Forest Service Law Enforcement & Investigations
- United States Department of Defense
  - Army Civilian Police
  - Army Criminal Investigation Command
  - Army Military Police Corps
  - Air Force Office of Special Investigations
  - Air Force Police
  - Naval Criminal Investigative Service
  - Navy Police
- United States Department of Homeland Security
  - Coast Guard
  - Customs and Border Protection (Border Patrol and Office of Field Ops)
  - Federal Air Marshal Service
  - Federal Protective Service
  - Immigration and Customs Enforcement
    - Enforcement and Removal Operations (ERO)
    - Homeland Security Investigations (HSI)
  - Secret Service
  - Transportation Security Administration
- United States Department of the Interior
  - Bureau of Indian Affairs Police (federally recognized Native tribes in the Upstate area)
  - Fish and Wildlife Office of Law Enforcement
  - National Park Service Law Enforcement Rangers
  - United States Park Police
- United States Department of Justice
  - Bureau of Alcohol, Tobacco, Firearms and Explosives
  - Drug Enforcement Administration
  - Federal Bureau of Investigation
    - FBI Police
  - Federal Bureau of Prisons
  - United States Marshals Service
- United States Department of State
  - Diplomatic Security Service
- United States Department of the Treasury
  - Federal Reserve Police
  - IRS Criminal Investigation Division
  - United States Mint Police
- United States Department of Veterans Affairs Police
- United States Environmental Protection Agency Criminal Investigation Division
- United States Postal Inspection Service
- Smithsonian Police (for the George Gustav Heye Center and the Cooper Hewitt, Smithsonian Design Museum)

== Other public agencies ==
Includes agencies run by NYS Public-benefit corporations

- Brooklyn Public Library Department of Public Safety
- Broome County Government Security Division
- Erie County Medical Center Hospital Public safety Department
- Lake George Park Commission Marine Patrol
- MTA Bridge and Tunnel Officers
- New York Racing Association Peace Officers
- New York State Bridge Authority Police
- Niagara Frontier Transportation Authority Police Department
- Roosevelt Island Public Safety Department
- Roswell Park Comprehensive Cancer Center Public Safety
- Syracuse Regional Airport Authority Police Department
- Troy Housing Authority Department of Public Safety

== Non-government / Private Company ==
- Bay Terrace Public Safety Department
- Big Six Towers Public Safety Department
- Co-op City Department of Public Safety
- Columbia-Greene Humane Society/SPCA Law Enforcement
- CSX Police Department
- Dutchess County SPCA Humane Law Enforcement
- Hudson Valley SPCA Humane Law Enforcement
- Humane Society of Greater Rochester Humane Law Enforcement
- Hunts Point Department of Public Safety
- Kaleida Health Security Department (Peace Officers) (Erie County)
- Morningside Heights Housing Corporation Department of Public Safety
- Nassau County SPCA (Humane Law Enforcement)
- Parkchester Department of Public Safety
- Peter Cooper Village-Stuyvesant Town Department of Public Safety
- Putnam County SPCA
- Sea Gate Public safety
- SPCA of Westchester County Humane Law Enforcement Unit
- SPCA Serving Erie County Investigations and Rescue Department
- Spring Creek Towers Department of Public Safety
- Suffolk County SPCA Humane Law Enforcement
- Ulster County SPCA Humane Law Enforcement
- Yonkers Raceway Public Safety

== Disbanded agencies ==
- Argyle Police Department
- Angola Police Department
- ASPCA Humane Law Enforcement Division (1866 - 2013)
- Babylon Town Police Department
- Babylon Village Police Department
- Brightwaters Police Department
- Bronx County Safety Patrol
- Bronx County Sheriff's Office
- Brookhaven Town Police Department
- Brooklyn Police Department (amalgamated with the New York City Police Department in 1898)
- Brooklyn Bridge Police
- Barker Police Department
- Brooklyn Town Police Department
- Brunswick Police Department
- Bushwick Town Police Department
- Buffalo Municipal Housing Authority Police (amalgamated with Buffalo Police Department in 2010)
- Busti Police Department
- Castleton Police Department
- Clay Police Department (Town)
- Clifton Park Police Department
- Corinth Police Department (Village of Corinth)
- Cortlandt Police Department (Town)
- Deposit Village Police Department
- East Nassau Police Department
- Elma Police Department
- East Syracuse Village Police
- Esopus Police Department (Town)
- Farmingdale Police Department
- Flatbush Town Police Department
- Flatlands Town Police Department
- Flushing Town Police Department
- Fort Edward Police Department
- Galway Police Department (Village of Galway)
- Grafton Police Department
- Gravesend Town Police Department
- Greenport Police Department
- Hampton Bays Police Department
- Village of Hermon Police Department
- Hoosick Police Department
- Huntington Town Police Department
- Islip Town Police Department
- Jamaica Town Police Department
- Kingsbridge Town Police Department
- Kings County Sheriff's Office
- Lakewood Police Department
- Lake George Police Department (Village of Lake George)
- Lindenhurst Police Department
- Long Island City Police Department
- Long Island Rail Road Police Department (merged to form the Metropolitan Transportation Authority Police Department)
- Long Island State Parkway Police (merged with the New York State Police and New York State Park Police)
- Lyons Village Police Department
- Metro-North Railroad Police Department (merged to form the Metropolitan Transportation Authority Police Department)
- Morrisania Town Police Department
- Mount Kisco Police Department (now merged and patrolled with the Westchester County Department of Public Safety)
- Naples Village Police Department (technically the Village still has a police department with a station but currently has no officers)
- New Lots Town Police Department
- Newtown Town Police Department
- New Utrecht Town Police Department
- New York City Housing Authority Police Department (amalgamated with the New York City Police Department in 1995)
- New York City Board of Education Division of School Safety (amalgamated with the New York City Police Department in 1998)
- New York City Transit Authority Police Department (amalgamated with the New York City Police Department in 1995)
- New York City Telegraph Bureau
- New York City Bureau of Water Supply Police
- New York County Sheriff's Office
- New York Cross Harbor Railroad Police
- New York State Capital Police (merged with the New York State Police)
- New York State Division of Parole (merged to form the New York State Department of Corrections and Community Supervision)
- New York State SPCC Child Abuse Unit
- Ossining Police Department (Town)
- Parish Police Department (Town)
- Patchogue Village Police Department
- Plandome Police Department
- Poestenkill Police Department
- Town of Putnam Valley New York Police Department (Putnam County)
- Queens County Sheriff's Office
- Queensbury Police Department
- Richmond County Sheriff's Office
- Roosevelt Police District
- Village of Salem Police Department
- Sand Lake Police Department
- Schaghticoke Police Department
- Schuylerville Police Department
- Staten Island Rapid Transit Police Department (merged with the Metropolitan Transportation Authority Police Department)
- Stephentown Police Department
- Smithtown Town Police Department
- Suffolk County Park Police (merged with the Suffolk County Police Department)
- Valley Falls Police Department
- Waterfront Commission of New York Harbor Police (succeeded by New York Waterfront Commission Police)
- Westchester County Sheriff's Department
- Westchester County Parkway Police
- West Farms Town Police Department
- Whitehall Police Department (Village)
- Woodsburgh Police Department

Town of Wheatland Town of Chili Town of Charlotte, annexed by the City of Rochester Village of Sodus Point Town of Marion Village of Sloan Village of Red Creek

== See also ==
- Crime in New York
- Law enforcement in the United States
- Briana's Law
- Law enforcement in New York City
- Law enforcement in Westchester County
- List of law enforcement agencies on Long Island
