= Nassau County Sheriff's Department =

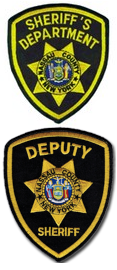

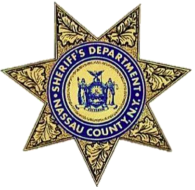
- Seal of the Nassau County Sheriff's Department
- Abbreviation: NCSD

Agency overview
- Formed: 1899

Jurisdictional structure
- Operations jurisdiction: Nassau County, New York, USA
- Map of Nassau County Sheriff's Department's jurisdiction
- Area: 287 square miles (land); 166 square miles (water)
- Population: 1,334,544
- Legal jurisdiction: Nassau County, New York
- General nature: Local civilian police

Operational structure
- Correction Officers: 835
- Deputy Sheriffs: 65
- Acting Sheriff responsible: Dr. Robert Matarazzo

Facilities
- Deputy Commands: County Building 240 & Family Court (Mineola, NY)
- Jails: Correctional Facility (East Meadow, NY)

Website
- nassaucountyny.gov/sheriff

The Nassau County Sheriff's Department (NCSD) is a local law enforcement agency serving Nassau County, New York, United States.

Established in 1899 following the formation of the county, it is responsible for civil, criminal, and correctional functions within its jurisdiction. The department is organized into two primary divisions: the Division of Corrections, which oversees the county’s correctional facility and inmate custody, and the Division of Enforcement, which executes court orders, serves civil process, and enforces applicable laws. The agency employs sworn personnel, including deputy sheriffs and correction officers, as well as civilian staff, and has played a role in the development of local law enforcement in Nassau County, including the establishment of the Nassau County Police Department in 1925.

== History ==
The office of the sheriff is historically traceable to Alfred the Great in late 9th-century Anglo-Saxon England. The unified kingdom was delineated into shires, known today as counties. A king’s representative, known as a shire-reeve, was assigned to each county, acting on behalf of the king. The English language would later evolve and over time the shire-reeve became known as the sheriff. The long-standing tradition of the sheriff was brought to Long Island by its early English settlers. Long Island was delineated into three geographical boundaries known as ridings. The West riding comprised present-day Nassau, Queens, and Kings counties. The East riding comprised present-day Suffolk County. The North riding comprised the remaining territory. Each riding had a deputy sheriff and a high sheriff was appointed by the governor to oversee the collective ridings that came to be known as Yorkshire. The constitutional convention of 1821 abolished the practice of appointing a high sheriff and instead, each individual county would choose their own sheriff through an election by the people. The office of the sheriff is the oldest law enforcement position in the United States.

In 1898, with approval from the New York State Legislature, the towns of Oyster Bay, North Hempstead, and a large portion of the Town of Hempstead were separated from Queens County officially forming the County of Nassau on January 1, 1899. The newly created Nassau County would have William H Wood as its first elected sheriff. Sheriff Wood went on to appoint Henry W Skinner as his undersheriff and also appointed the first deputy sheriff's thus making the Nassau County Sheriff's Department the oldest law enforcement agency in Nassau County. The Nassau County Sheriff's Department went on to play a vital role in the early foundation of law enforcement in Nassau County.

In 1900 the Nassau County Board of Supervisors approved the construction of the first Nassau County Jail to be under the control of the Sheriff's Department. The jail was built as an addition to the rear of the county courthouse located in Mineola. The jail consisted of multiple floors and wings which provided separate housing for men and women. It also provided a space in the center for jailors and Matron to operate within. In 1950, to keep pace with Nassau County’s booming population, the county constructed a new correctional center located in East Meadow, New York. The East Meadow correctional center has received multiple additions since its inception and remains the central hub for all Division of Corrections operations.

In 1915, the Nassau County Sheriff's Department played a pivotal part in the implementation of a public safety telecommunications system devised by Charles A Ryder of the New York Telephone Company. With the Sheriff's Department at the helm, the system connected the various scattered county, town, and city law enforcement agencies within the county to a central hub. This system enabled law enforcement throughout the county to easily and effectively communicate pertinent information regarding reported crimes in progress with one another. All law enforcement throughout Nassau County could be alerted to an incident if required.

By the 1920s New York City had begun to blend into Nassau County's western border. As a consequence to the prohibition of alcohol organized crime also began to boom. In 1925 due to rising concerns for public safety the Nassau County Police Department was founded. At the time of its formation, the Police Department was composed of fifty-five deputy sheriffs who were absorbed from the Nassau County Sheriff's Department. Today, the Nassau County Sheriff's Department employs approximately 1200 people including civilian staff, correction officers, and deputy sheriffs.

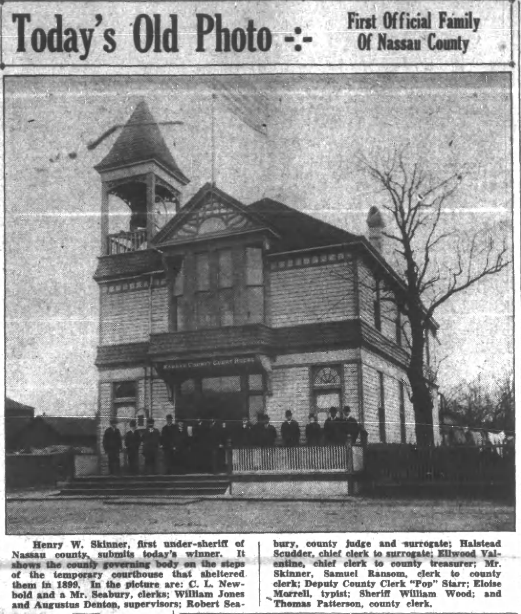
Nassau County sheriff Wood and undersheriff Skinner at the Nassau County's temporary court house, circa 1899

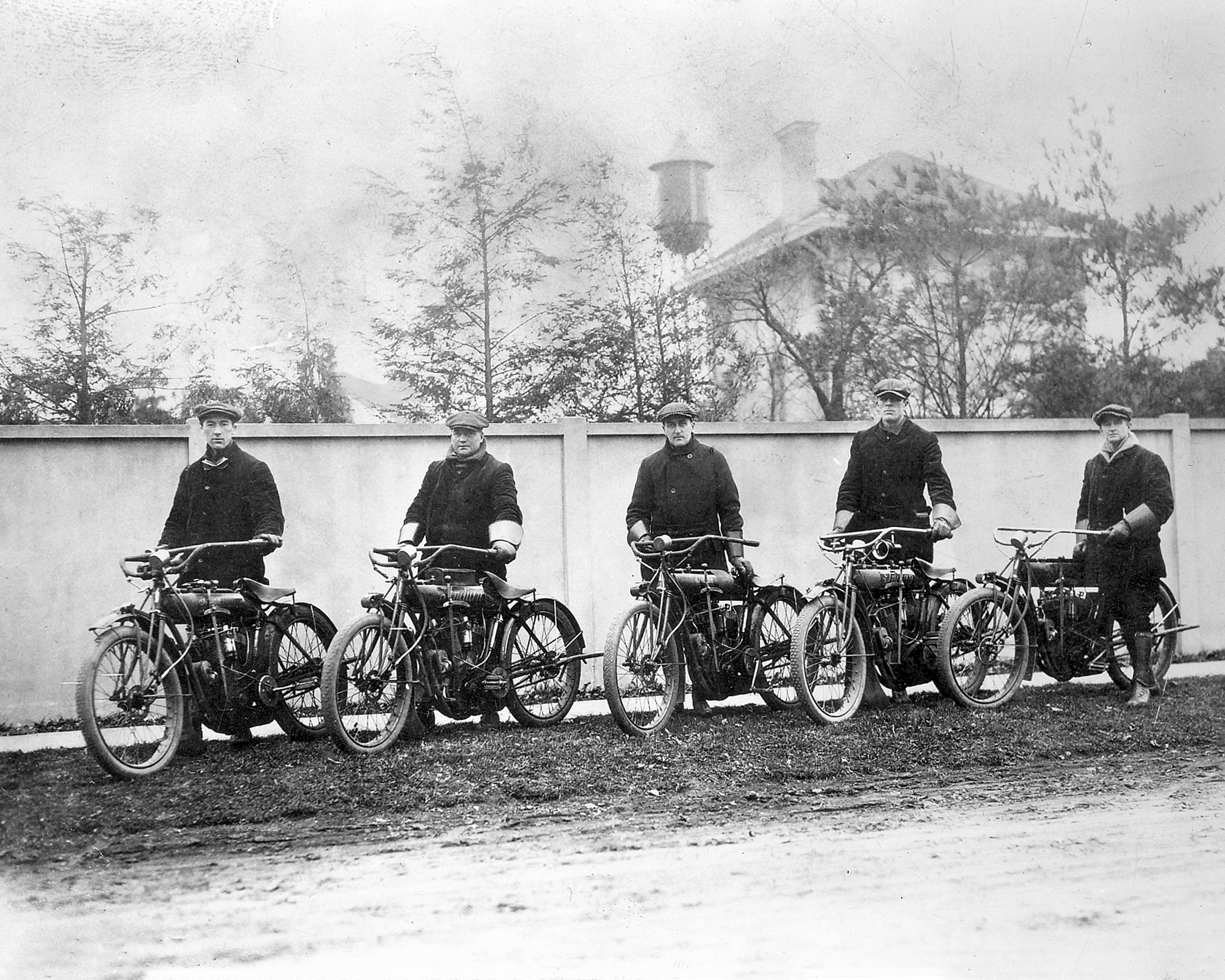
Nassau County deputy sheriffs patrolling on motorcycles, cicra 1911

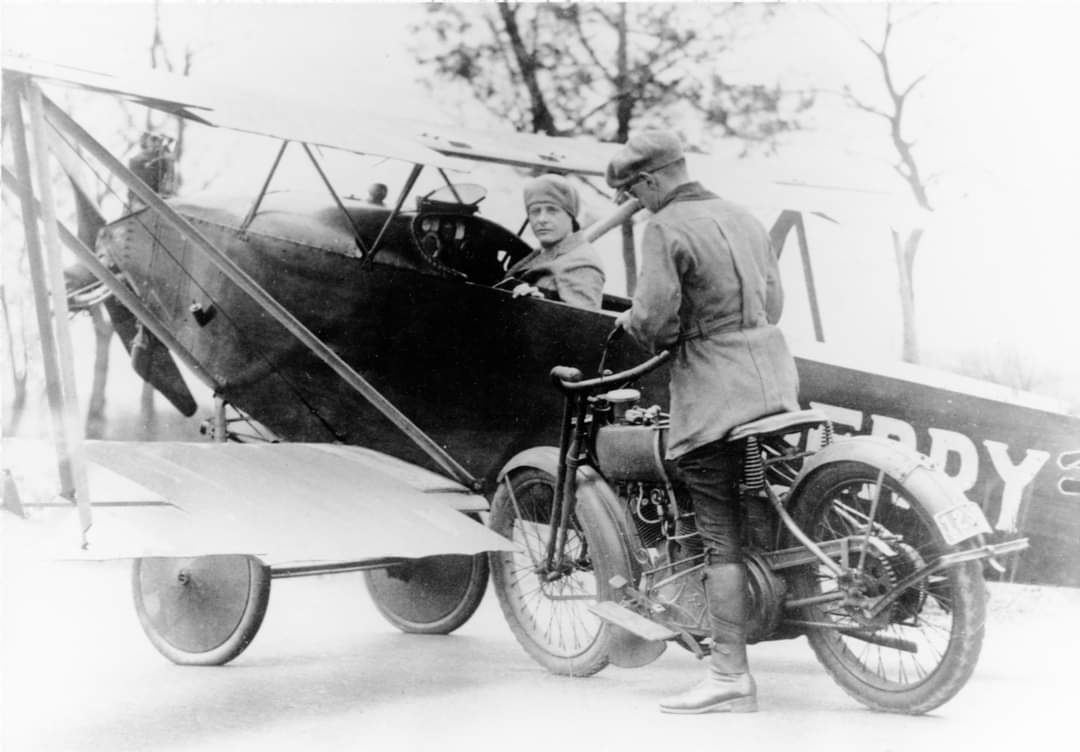
Nassau County deputy sheriff tickets Lawrence Sperry after landing a plane in the street, circa 1922.

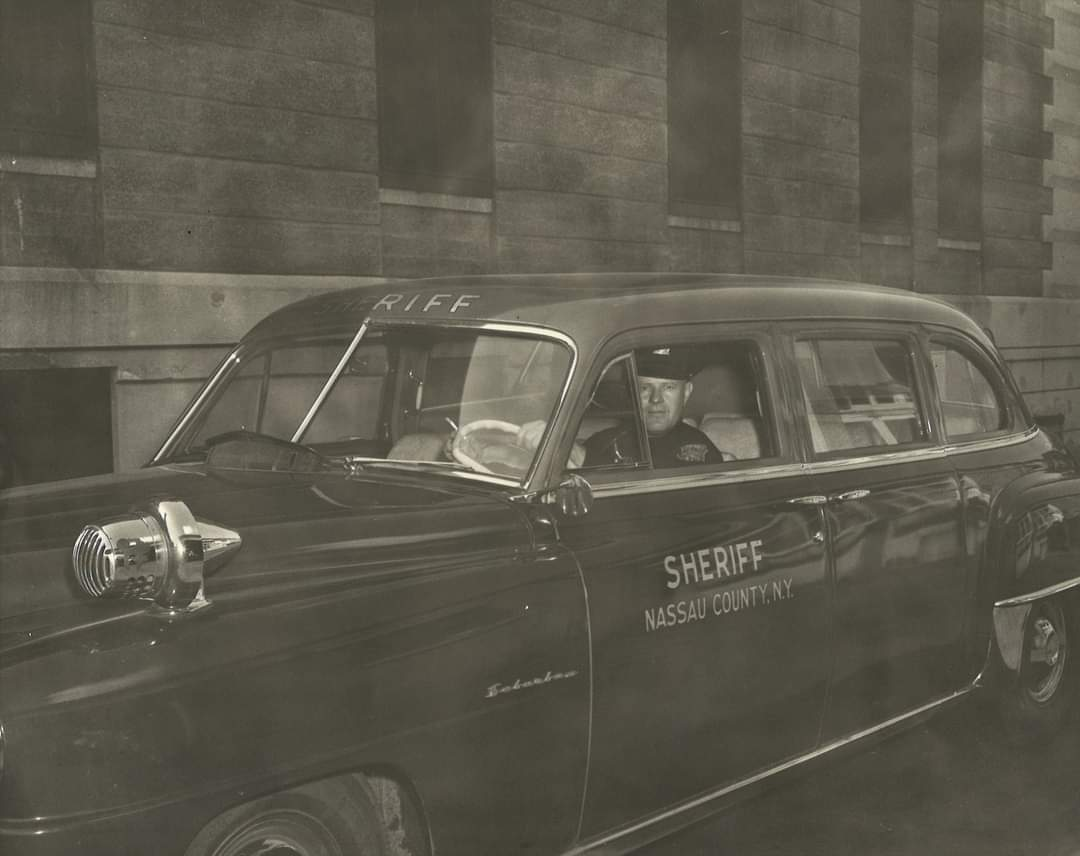
Deputy sheriff outside the Mineola courthouse, circa 1955

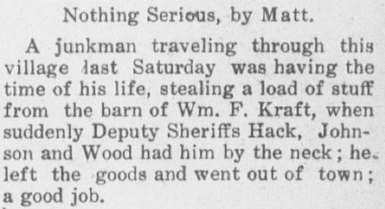
South SideMmessenger newspaper clipping, "Nassau County Deputy Sheriff's Foil Barn Thief," circa 1910

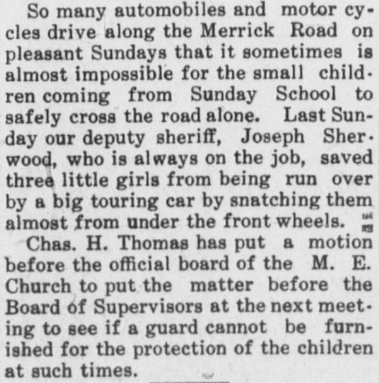
Nassau County Review newspaper clipping, "Children Saved by Nassau County Deputy Sheriff," circa 1913

== Department organization and rank structure ==
The Nassau County Sheriff's Department is organized into two distinct divisions known as the Division of Corrections and the Division of Enforcement. The Division of Corrections is responsible for all aspects of the county’s correctional facility (jail). The Division of Enforcement executes orders from the New York state courts and enforces both civil and criminal law throughout the county.

Department Heads
| Title | Insignia | Duties |
|---|---|---|
| Sheriff | | The sheriff is first in command |
| Undersheriff | | The undersheriff is second in command |

Division of Corrections
| Title | Insignia | Duties |
|---|---|---|
| Commissioner of Corrections | Unknown | The commissioner of corrections is a division commander. |
| Deputy Undersheriff | | The deputy undersheriff is an assistant division commander. |
| Chief Administrative Officer | Unknown | The chief administrative officer is a special units commander. |
| Correction Officer Captain | | Corrections officer captains are platoon/unit commanders. |
| Correction Officer Lieutenant | | Corrections officer lieutenants are tour commanders. |
| Correction Officer Sergeant | | Corrections officer sergeants are tour supervisors. |
| Correction Officer Corporal | | Corrections officer corporals are housing unit supervisors. |
| Correction Officer | | |

Division of Enforcement
| Title | Insignia | Duties |
|---|---|---|
| Chief Deputy Sheriff | | The chief deputy sheriff is the division commander. |
| Deputy Sheriff Captain | | Deputy sheriff captains are assistant division commanders. |
| Deputy Sheriff Lieutenant | | Deputy sheriff lieutenants are unit commanding officers. |
| Deputy Sheriff Sergeant | | Deputy sheriff sergeants are unit field supervisors. |
| Deputy Sheriff | | |

== Division of Corrections - correction officers ==
The Division of Corrections is staffed by correction officers who are sworn peace officers pursuant to Article 2.10 Subsection 25 of the states Criminal Procedure Law. The mission of the Division of Corrections is to provide a safe and secure environment for staff and inmates. Correction officers provide for the care, custody, control, and rehabilitation of detainees and inmates committed to its custody by the judiciary. In this regard, the department is required to comply with all laws, specifically correction law, oversight agencies such as the New York State Commission of Corrections, existing consent decrees, and court mandates.

- Correction officers attend and graduate from the Correction Officers Academy ran by the Nassau County Sheriff's Department. Academy training is approximately 12 weeks and includes the following:
  - Certification by the NYS DCJS - Metropolitan Police Training Council as peace officers (completing the Basic Course for Peace Officers).
  - Training in New York State Correction, Penal, and Criminal Procedure Law.
  - Physical training and defensive tactics, including handcuffing, control techniques, and less lethal use of force.
  - Training in firearms and the use of deadly physical force.
  - Training and first-aid, CPR, and AED.
  - Training in mental health awareness and de-escalation techniques.
- Correction officers provide security at the Nassau County Correctional Center (Jail) and transport inmates as required for court appearances, medical attention, and transfer of custody pursuant to sentencing. Correction officers are assigned to work in the following units.
  - Operations Unit
  - Security Unit
  - Sheriff's Bureau of Investigation (SBI)
    - Medical Investigations Unit
    - Internal Affairs
    - Criminal Investigation Unit
    - Gang Unit
    - Grievance Unit
  - Communications Unit
  - K-9 Unit
  - Transportation Unit
  - Visiting Unit
  - Rehabilitation Unit
  - Medical Unit
  - Sheriff's Emergency Response Team (S.E.R.T)
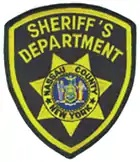
Patch worn by Nassau County Correction Officers & Civilian LSU/CC Staff.

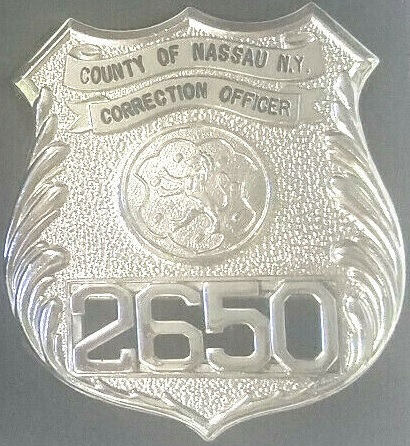
Shield worn by Nassau County Correction Officers.

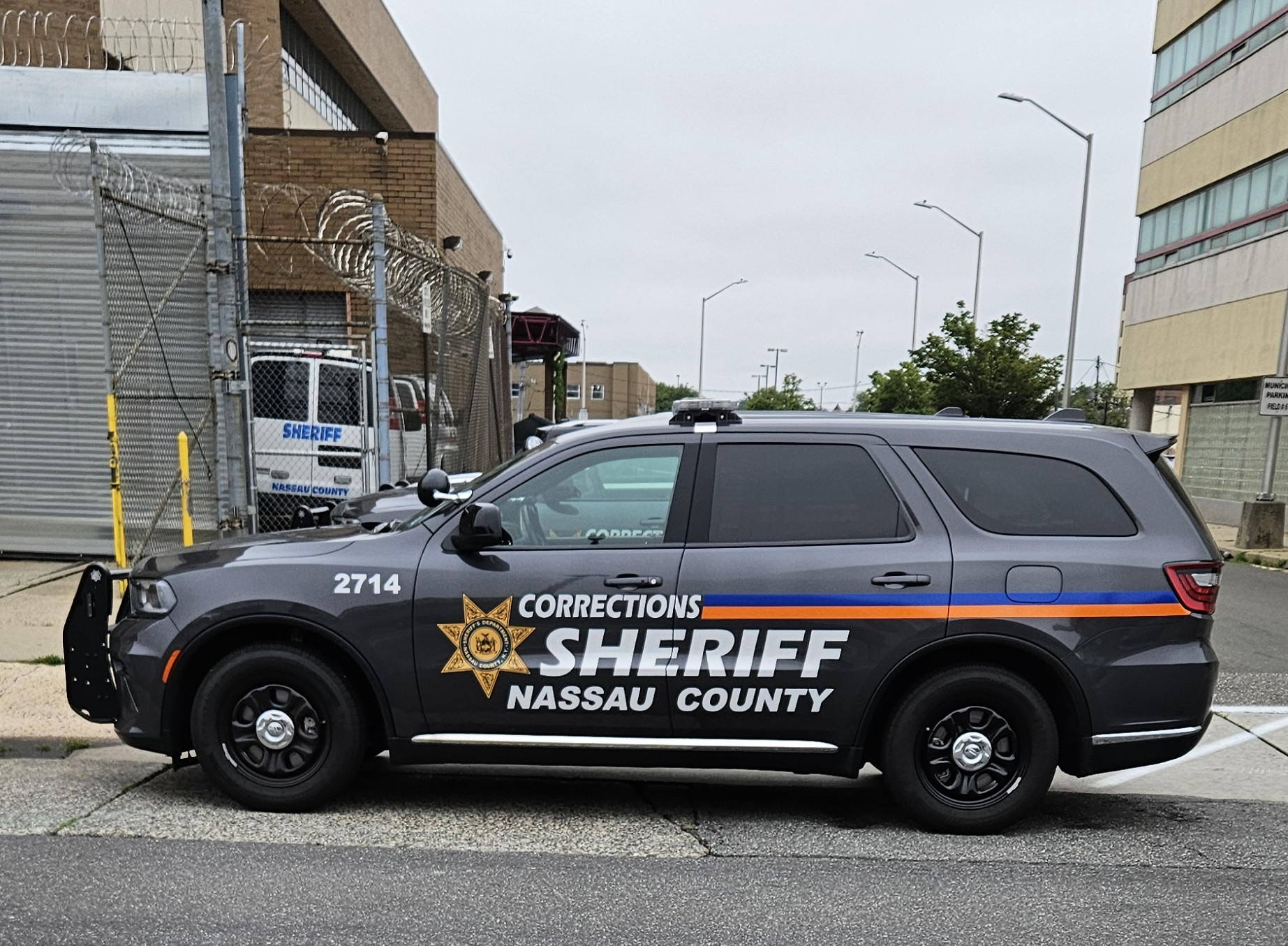
Nassau County Corrections Dodge Durango.

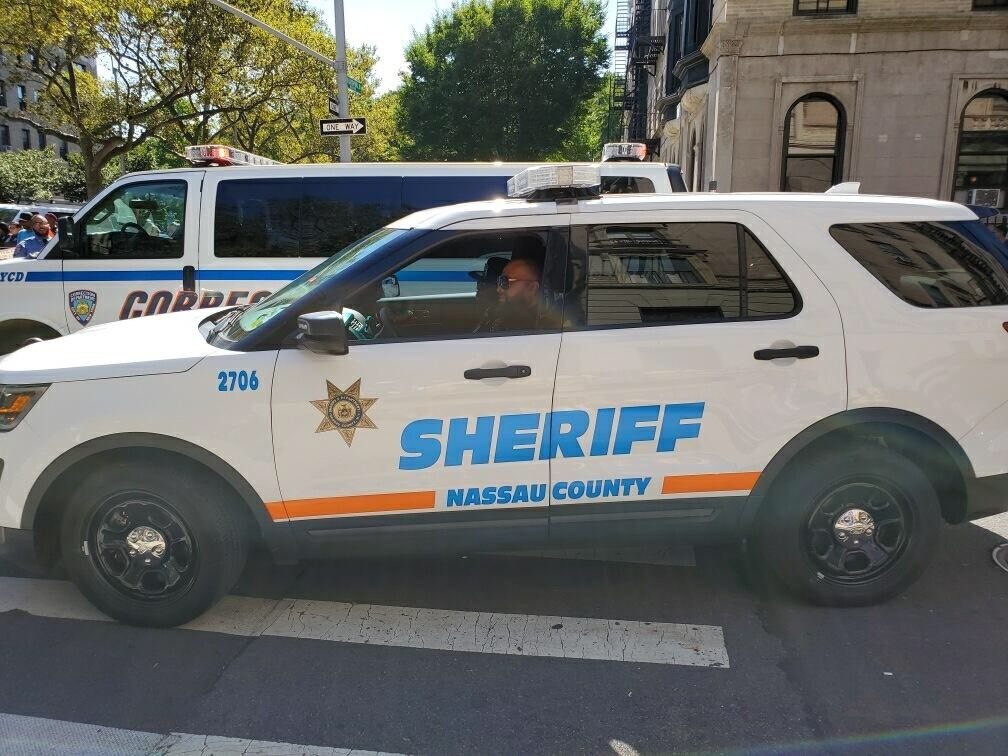
Nassau County Corrections Ford Explorer (Old Design).

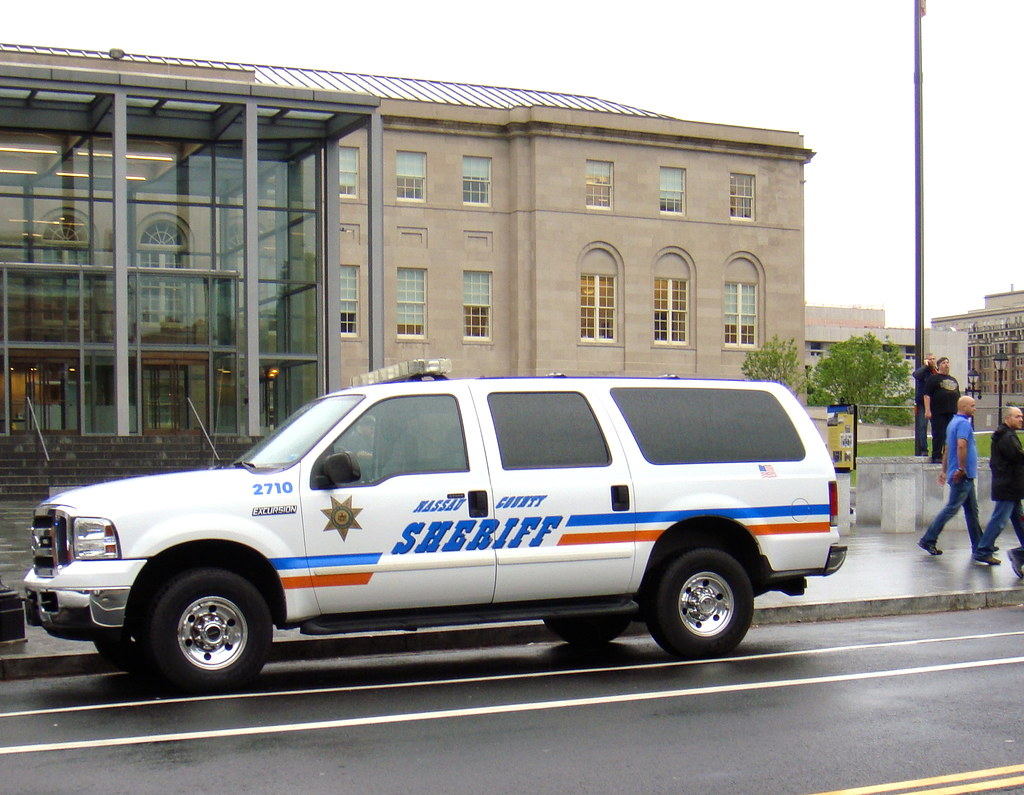
Nassau County Corrections Ford Excursion (Old Design).

== Division of Enforcement - deputy sheriffs ==
The Division of Enforcement is staffed by deputy sheriffs who are sworn NYS-certified police officers pursuant to Article 1.20 Subsection 34(B) of the states Criminal Procedure Law. The mission of the Division of Enforcement is to carry out the orders of the New York State Courts. This includes the execution of warrants, the discovery and seizure of property, the serving of civil process, and to conduct evictions. Deputy Sheriffs draw their authority to enforce both criminal and civil law from the NYS Criminal Procedure Law, NYS Constitution, and the Nassau County Charter.

- Deputy sheriffs attend and graduate from the Nassau County Police Academy alongside officers from the county police as well as officers from village and city police departments within Nassau County. Police academy training is approximately 6 months includes the following.
  - Certification by the NYS DCJS - Metropolitan Police Training Council as Police Officers (completing the Basic Course for Police Officers).
  - Training and certification in Standardized Field Sobriety Testing for DWI offenders.
  - Training in New York State Penal, Criminal Procedure, Vehicle and Traffic, Environmental Conservation, Domestic Relations and other Laws.
  - Physical Training exceeding the cooper standards and Extensive Defensive Tactics, including arrest and control techniques.
  - Training in Emergency Vehicle Operations.
  - Training in Firearms and the use of Deadly Physical Force.
  - Training less lethal force including Tazer, Baton, and Pepper Spray.
  - Training and NYS Department of Health certification as emergency care providers.
  - Training in Mental Health Awareness and De-Escalation Techniques.
- Deputy sheriffs do not provide security at the Nassau County Correctional Center (Jail) or in the courts. Deputy sheriffs work throughout the entire geographical area of Nassau County and are assigned to the following units.
  - Sheriff's Warrant Apprehension Program (SWAP)
  - Landlord and Tenant Eviction Unit
  - Domestic Violence Unit / Family Court Unit
  - Field Unit / Personal and Real Property Law Unit
  - Joint Federal Task Forces
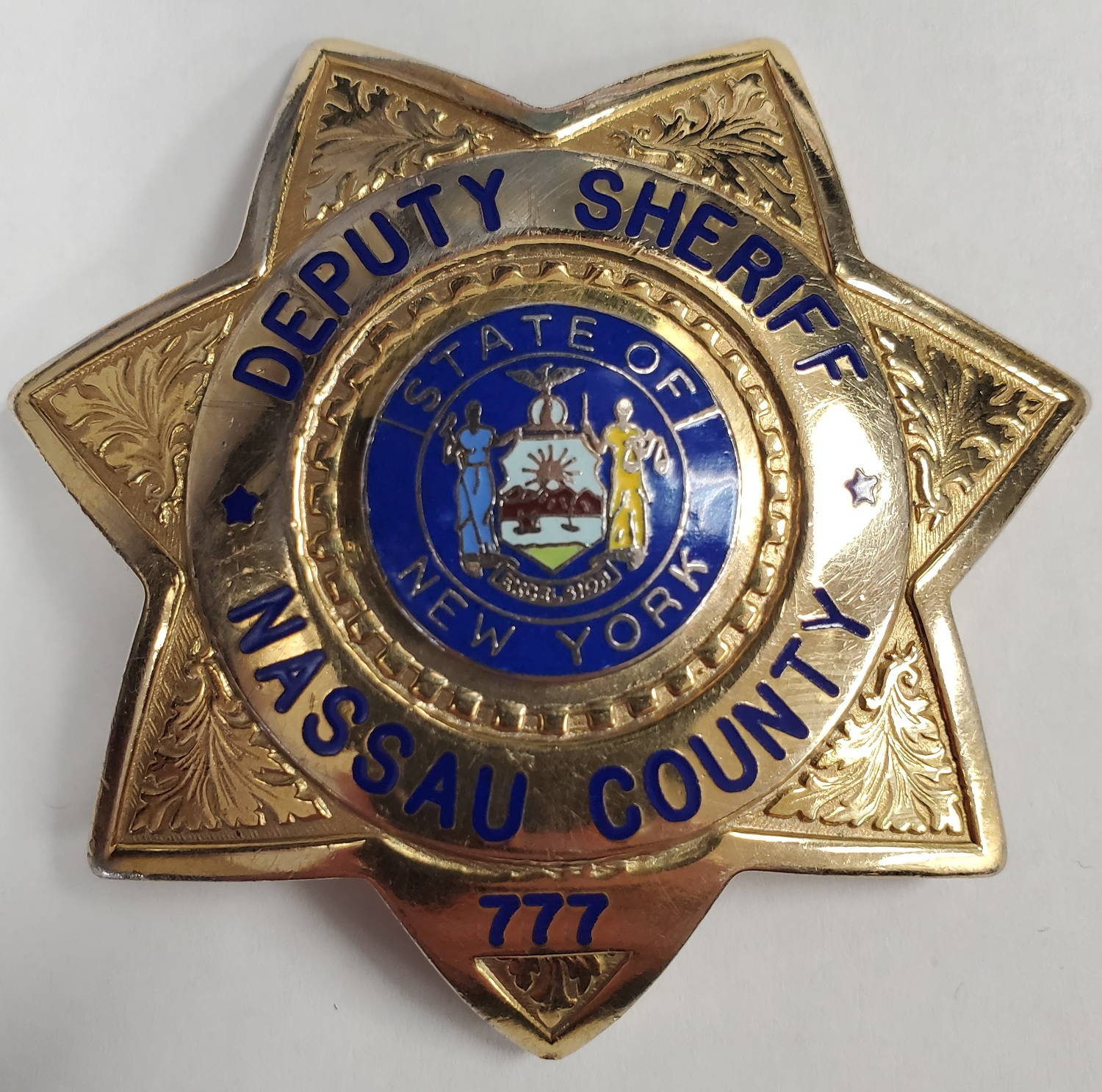
Shield worn by Nassau County deputy sheriff's (Enscribed Deputy Sheriff).

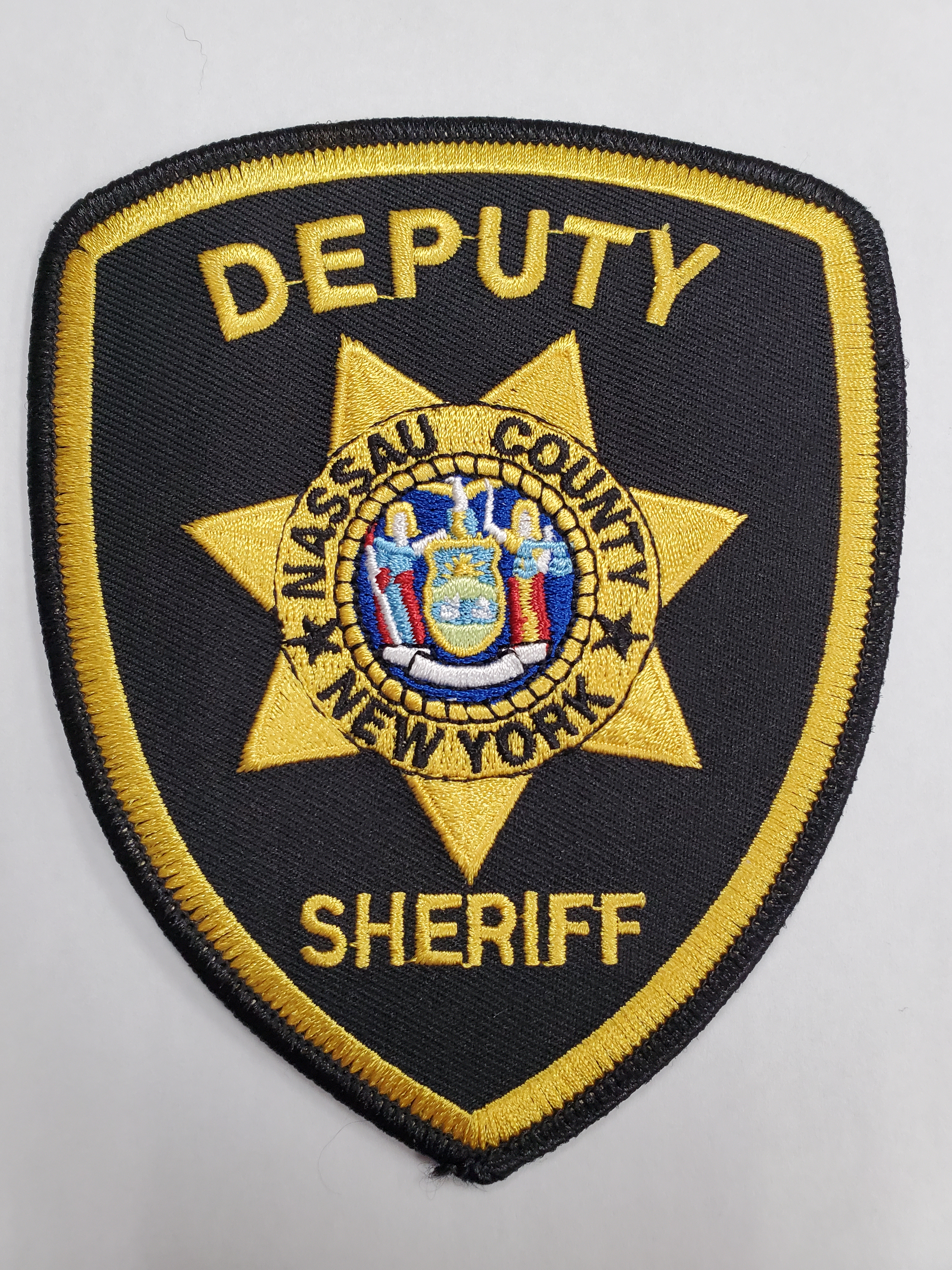
Patch worn by Nassau County deputy sheriff's (Stitching says Deputy Sheriff).

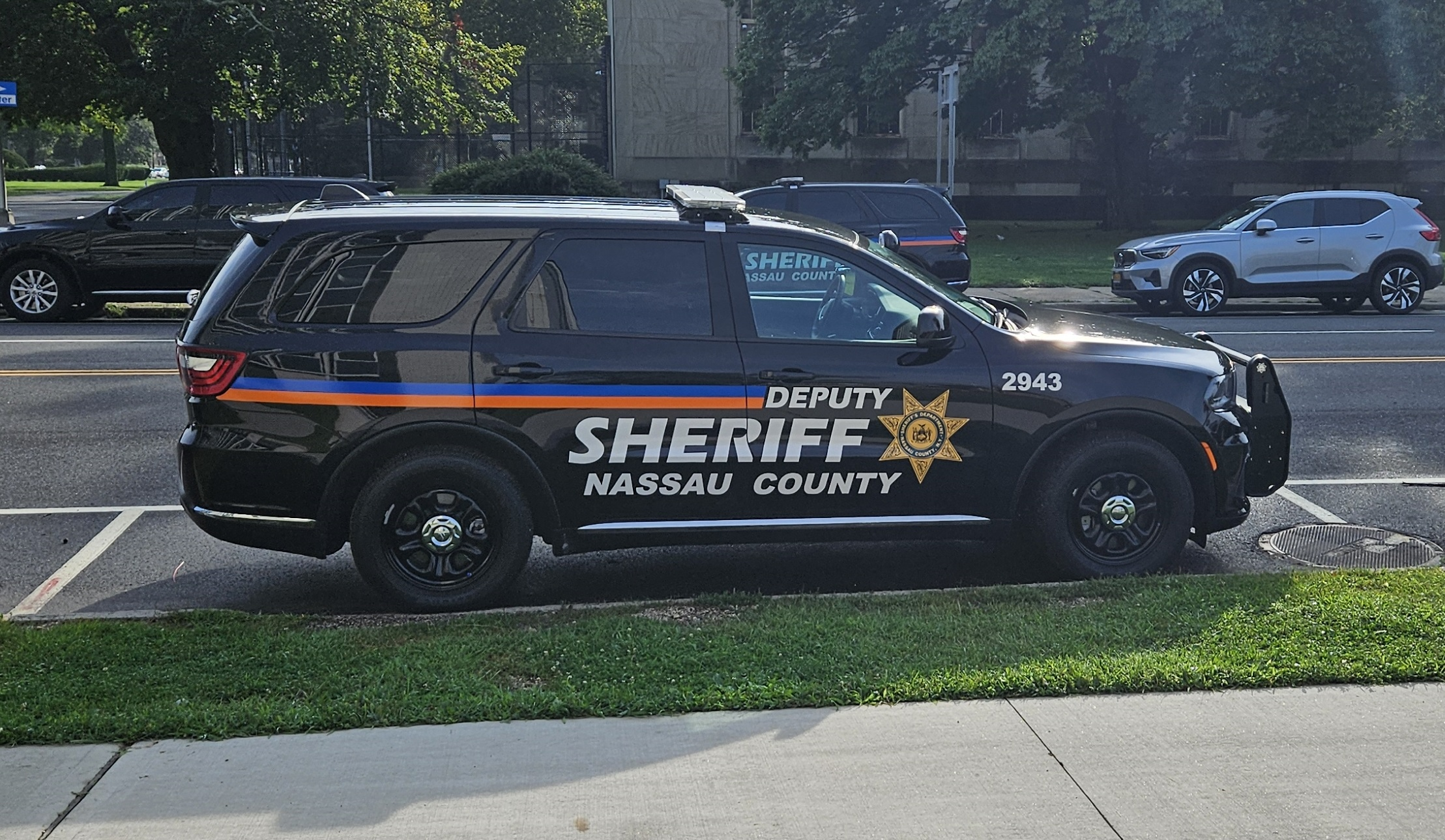
Nassau County deputy sheriff Dodge Durango.

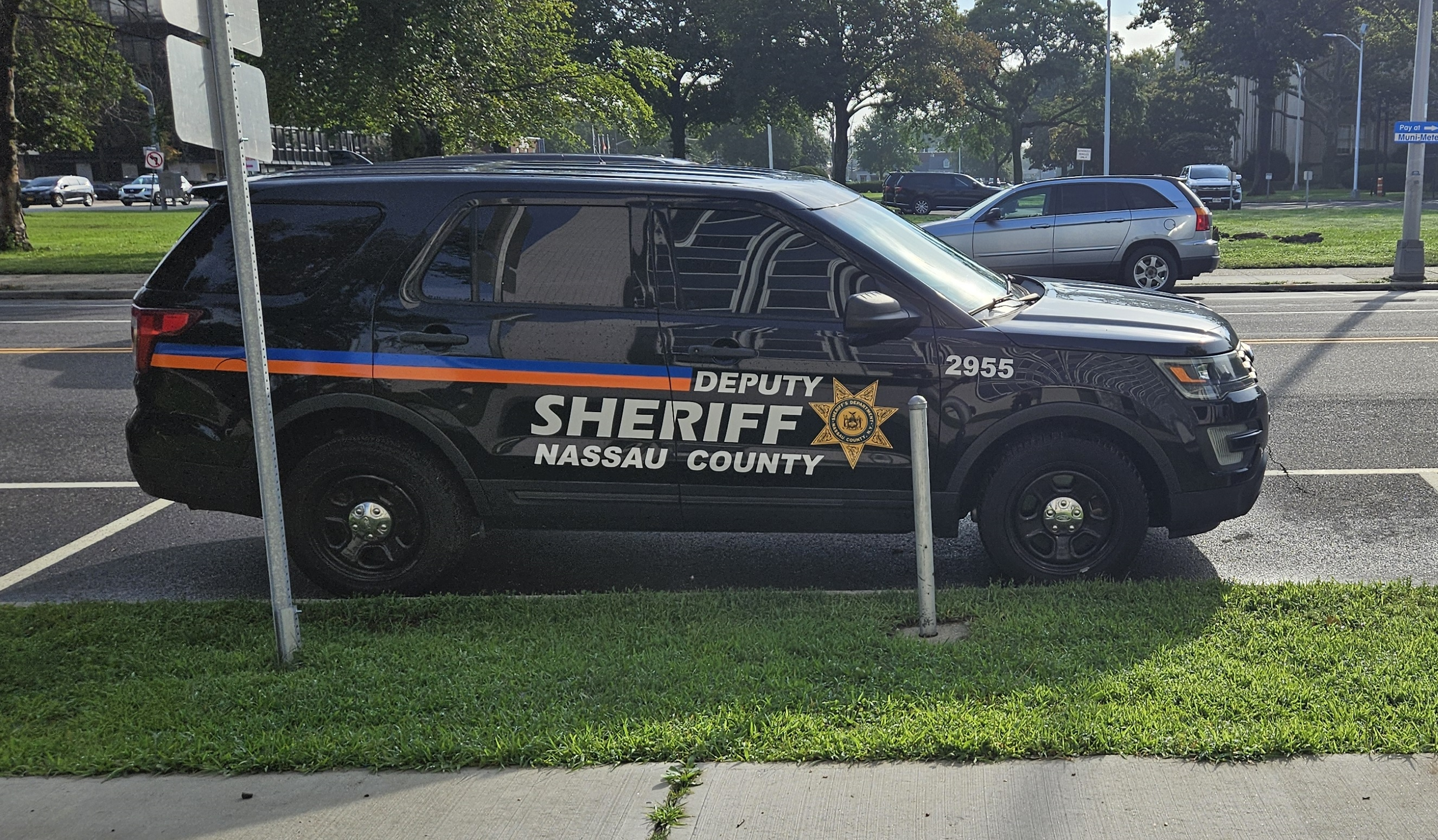
Nassau County deputy sheriff Ford Explorer

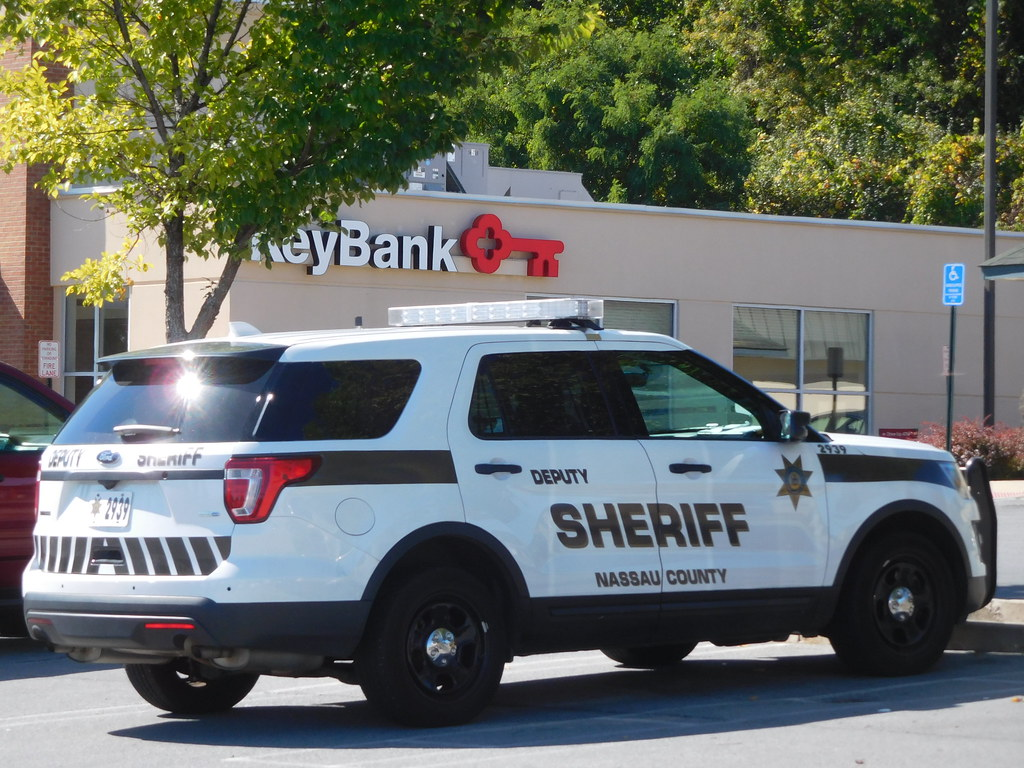
Nassau County deputy sheriff Ford Explorer (Old Design).

== Civilian staff ==
The Nassau County Sheriff's Department employs both non-uniformed and uniformed civilians (non–law enforcement). These civilians support the administrative and logistical needs of the department by carrying out various duties as it relates to their positions.

- Non-uniformed civilians
  - Administrative assistants
  - Clerks and secretaries
  - Cashiers
  - HR personnel
  - Accountants, Payroll, and Budgeting Personnel
- Uniformed civilians (Logistical Support Unit & Civilian Correctional Center Staff)
  - Vehicle mechanics and fleet maintenance supervisors
  - Building maintenance
  - Grounds keepers
  - Cooks and food service supervisors
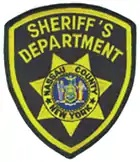
Patch worn by the LSU and Civilian Correctional Center Staff (Same patch also worn by Correction Officers).

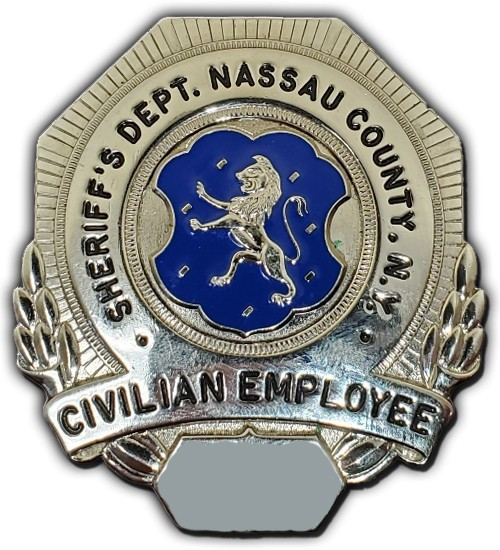
New Style Badge worn by the LSU and Civilian Correctional Center Staff.

== Fallen corrections officers ==
Since the establishment of the Nassau County Sheriff's Department, 4 corrections officers have died in the line of duty.

| Officer | Date of death | Details |
|---|---|---|
| Corrections Officer George H. Klimpel | Friday, December 12, 1986 | Automobile Accident |
| Corrections Officer Maureen F. Callanan | Friday, December 12, 1986 | Automobile Accident |
| Corrections Officer Anthony L. Brown | Sunday, June 18, 1995 | Gunfire |
| Corrections Officer John R. Allen | Wednesday, March 16, 2005 | Fall |

== Appointed sheriff controversy ==
In August 1965 the Nassau County County Board of Supervisors, the predecessor to the County Legislature, passed a resolution (to begin in 1968) for a local proposal granting the county executive the authority to appoint a county sheriff if approved by the majority of the board. In November 1965 the proposal was put to a vote by county residents and passed. Joseph F. Maher was sworn in as the first appointed sheriff in Nassau County history On Jan. 1, 1968.

Article XIII of the current New York State Constitution states,

Except in counties in the city of New York and except as authorized in section one of article nine of this constitution, registers in counties having registers shall be chosen by the electors of the respective counties once in every three years and whenever the occurring of vacancies shall require; the sheriff and the clerk of each county shall be chosen by the electors once in every three or four years as the legislature shall direct.

While there is an exemption allowing an appointed sheriff in the 5 counties within the City of New York, no such exemption exists for Nassau County. Of the 62 counties in New York State, Nassau County is the only county without exemption in the New York State Constitution to have an appointed sheriff which has led some to question the constitutionality of having an appointed sheriff for Nassau County. The appointment of a sheriff in Nassau County has not yet been challenged through the courts.

== See also ==
- List of law enforcement agencies in New York
- List of law enforcement agencies on Long Island
- Nassau County Police Department
