= Law enforcement in Westchester County =

There are forty-five local police agencies in Westchester County, New York. In recent years, rising economic costs have spurred some smaller communities to consolidate or contract their police services with other agencies.

== Westchester County Department of Public Safety ==
Westchester County Department of Public Safety was created in 1979 through the merger of the Westchester County Sheriff's Office with the Westchester County Parkway Police. The Westchester County Police provide primary law enforcement services for county-owned parks, parkways, and facilities. They also patrol the town of Mount Kisco and supplement patrol along with the New York State Police for the town of Cortlandt. The department is the fourth-largest law enforcement agency in Westchester County.

In 2010, then-Westchester county executive Robert P. Astorino announced a plan to merge the county departments of Public Safety and Emergency Services. As of 2021, these departments remain separate, and the plan appears to have been abandoned.

== Local police departments ==
The following departments are responsible for primary law enforcement in their respective jurisdictions.

- Ardsley Village Police Department
- Bedford Town Police Department
- Briarcliff Manor Police Department
- Bronxville Village Police Department
- Buchanan Police Department
- Croton-on-Hudson Police Department
- Dobbs Ferry Village Police Department
- Eastchester Town Police Department
- Elmsford Village Police Department
- Greenburgh Town Police Department
- Harrison Village/Town Police Department
- Hastings-on-Hudson Police Department
- Irvington Village Police Department
- Larchmont Village Police Department
- Lewisboro Police Department
- Mamaroneck Town Police Department
- Mamaroneck Village Police Department
- Mount Pleasant Town Police Department
- City of Mount Vernon Police Department
- New Castle Town Police Department
- New Rochelle Police Department
- North Castle Town Police Department
- North Salem Town Police Department
- Ossining Village Police Department
- City of Peekskill Police Department
- Pelham Manor Police Department
- Pelham Village Police Department
- Pleasantville Village Police Department
- Port Chester Village Police Department
- Pound Ridge Town Police Department
- Rye Brook Police Department
- City of Rye Police Department
- Scarsdale Village/Town Police Department
- Sleepy Hollow Village Police Department
- Somers Police Department
- Tarrytown Police Department
- Tuckahoe Village Police Department
- City of White Plains Police Department
- City of Yonkers Police Department
- Yorktown Town Police Department

== Other law enforcement agencies ==
- Westchester County District Attorney Investigations Squad
- Westchester County Department of Correction
- Westchester County Probation Department
- New York State Police (has multiple barracks located in Westchester County, responsible for police services in the towns of Cortlandt, Lewisboro, North Salem, Somers and Pound Ridge, on state roads and major thoroughfares such as New York State Thruway, Taconic State Parkway, Interstate 684, Interstate 95 as well as supplementing local police agencies with additional resources)
- New York State Department of Environmental Conservation Police (NYS DEC Police)
- New York State Park Police (responsible for patrol and security of all New York State Parks and Sites in Westchester County)
- New York State University Police at Purchase College
- New York City Department of Environmental Protection Police (NYC DEP Police) (Responsible for securing the NYC water supply system in Westchester County - i.e. NYC water shed located in Northern Westchester).
- Town of Pelham Constable
- The SPCA of Westchester Humane Law Enforcement has jurisdiction throughout Westchester to enforce Animal Cruelty laws.
- Metropolitan Transportation Authority Police (MTA Police) (Responsible for security and patrol of Metro-North Railroad property)
- Amtrak Police

== Bay constables ==
The City of Rye and Village of Mamaroneck employs seasonal bay constables who serve as peace officers. Constables patrol areas of Long Island Sound and enforce state, local maritime, environmental, fish, and wildlife laws. Bay constables are licensed armed peace officers as per NYS CPL 2.10(18).

== Auxiliary police officers ==
Several municipalities in Westchester have auxiliary police units which contain volunteers who are trained peace officers and assist their police departments with special events, traffic control, crowd control and patrol under the supervision of full time police officers. Auxiliary police officers derive their authority through NYS CPL 2.10(26) and only have the powers of peace officers pursuant to the provisions of the New York State defense emergency act during a period of attack or imminent attack by enemy forces or while combating natural or man made disasters.

== Public Safety Emergency Force ==
The Public Safety Emergency Force (PSEF) is a volunteer unit within the Westchester County Department of Public Safety. Members of the PSEF are appointed as part-time Deputy Sheriffs by the Commissioner/Sheriff and have full peace officer powers when activated pursuant to New York State criminal procedure law section 2.10 Subdivision 57a. All Members are provided with equipment including a county-issued handgun (M&P40 2.0)

== Defunct law enforcement agencies ==
- Cortlandt Town PD - disbanded; police services in Cortlandt provided by the New York State Police, augmented by the Westchester County Police.
- Mount Kisco Town/Village PD - disbanded, officers merged with Westchester County Police. Mount Kisco is currently patrolled by Westchester County Police.
- Ossining Town PD - The Village of Ossining Police provides police services to the unincorporated part of the Town of Ossining as well as the Village of Ossining.
- Rye Town PD - The Police Officers that made up the Town of Rye Police Department were transferred to the newly formed Village of Rye Brook Police Department ON June 1st, 1983.

== See also ==
- List of law enforcement agencies in New York
- Law enforcement in New York City
- List of law enforcement agencies on Long Island
