= Southold Town Police Department =

Police department in Southold, New York

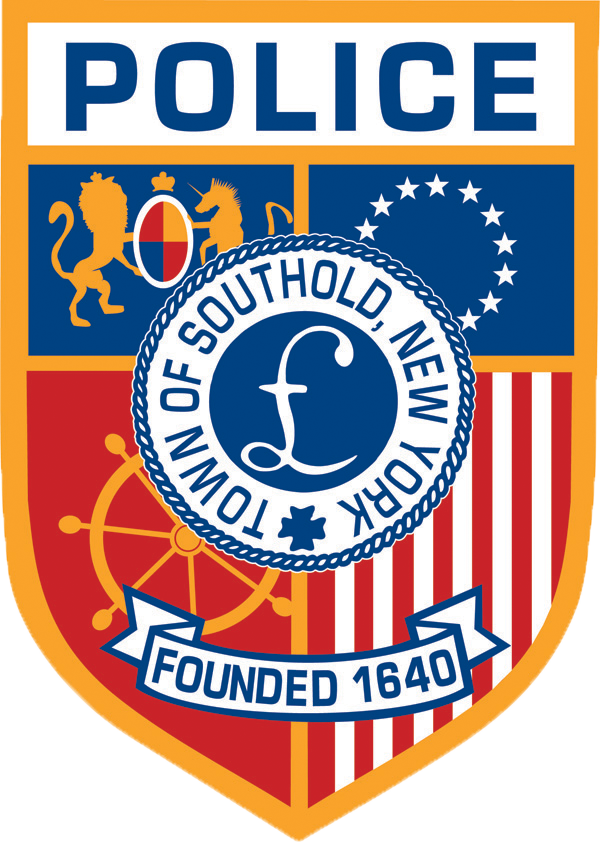
- Logo

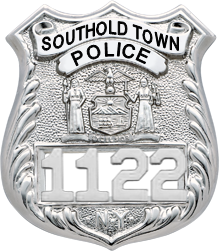
- Patrol officer shield
- Common name: Southold Police
- Abbreviation: STPD

Agency overview
- Formed: 1640
- Employees: 69 (2019)
- Annual budget: USD$8.4 million (2020)

Jurisdictional structure
- Operations jurisdiction: Southold, New York, United States
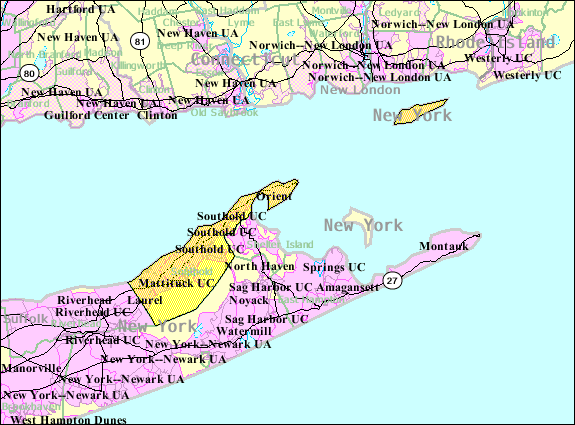
- Map of Southold Police's jurisdiction.
- Area: 403.70 square miles (1,045.6 km^{2})
- Population: 20,114 (2016)
- Governing body: Southold Town Board
- General nature: Civilian police

Operational structure
- Headquarters: 41405 Route 25; Peconic, New York 11958
- Police Officers: 49 (2019)
- Civilians: 20 (2019)
- Agency executive: Steven Grattan, Chief of Police

Website
- Official website

The Southold Town Police Department (STPD), commonly referred to as Southold Police, is the primary law enforcement agency within the town of Southold, New York. The Southold Police Department also operates an emergency service dispatch center, servicing two police departments and eight local fire departments.

== History ==
Law enforcement in the Town of Southold dates back to 1640 when the land was first settled. The land was purchased under the authority of the New Haven colony, and Southold's town was managed similarly to other colonies under New Haven's control. The local government existed through the church, and all cases, criminal and civil, were heard by a court of judges following the "laws of God." The court established rules regulating highways, property, and common areas. These rules were enforced by every man in the town, who was required to carry their own guns and ammunition. When called upon, the local militia assembled in the town to enforce laws.

The town's police department, as it exists today, was established under Southold Town Code § 51 on September 29, 1964. The town's code created a structure for the standing police force, including the department's authority and duties.

In November 1994, the Southold Police Department's authority expanded to include the Village of Greenport. The Greenport Village Police Department disbanded after a series of scandals led to a grand jury investigation.

In 2017, the Southold Police Department began the process of accreditation with the New York State Division of Criminal Justice Services. The accreditation standardizes law enforcement throughout the state, bringing transparency, increased cooperation, standardized training, and more benefits to the department. The process included adjusting the department's standing rules and regulations to the state's standard. Southold Police was the last police department in Suffolk County to seek accreditation with the state, and received its accreditation in 2026.

== Organization ==
=== Jurisdiction ===
The Southold Police Department patrols three regional sectors, including Plum Island and Fishers Island. The Southold Police Department's Marine Division also works with the United States Coast Guard to patrol and enforce maritime law in Orient Harbor, Greenport Harbor, the Peconic Bay, and a portion of the Long Island Sound.

Regional Patrol Sectors

- Mattituck Sector
  - Mattituck
  - Laurel
- Cutchogue Sector
  - Cutchogue
  - New Suffolk
  - Peconic
- Southold Sector
  - Southold
  - Greenport
  - Greenport West
  - East Marion
  - Orient
  - Plum Island
  - Fishers Island

=== Rank structure ===
All police officers within the Southold Police Department are appointed by the Southold Town Board. When additional services are required, the Town Board may appoint temporary police officers, known as special policemen, with the same power and authority as regular police officers. While the Southold Police Department does not have a standing Police Commissioner, the Town Board may establish a Board of Police Commissioners, consisting of one to three town residents, to oversee the operations of the police department.

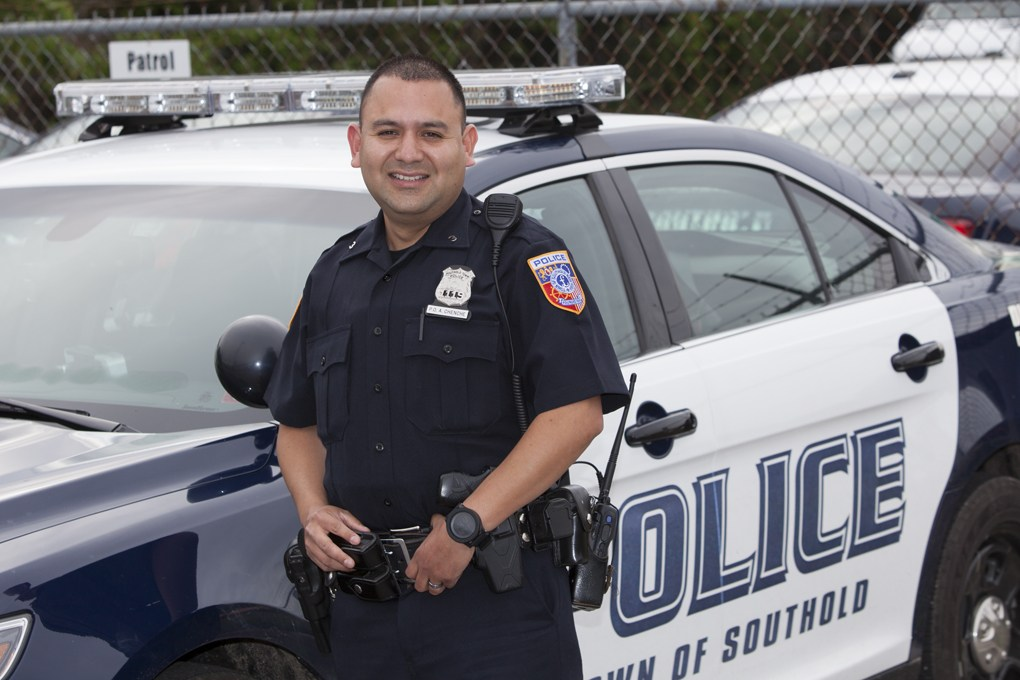
Officer Alex Chenche, Southold Police

Title	Insignia	Badge	Uniform
Chief of Police			White shirt, peaked cap, gold hat badge
Lieutenant			White shirt, peaked cap, gold hat badge
Sergeant			Navy blue shirt, peaked cap, gold hat badge
Detective	None		Navy blue shirt, peaked cap, gold hat badge
Police Officer	None		Navy blue shirt, peaked cap, silver hat badge

== Crime statistics ==
In 2019, the Southold Police Department responded to 18,776 reports of crime and made 139 arrests. The department also responded to 836 motor vehicle accidents and assisted local fire departments in 2,028 aid cases. A 2019 safety index combining FBI crime statistics and law enforcement employee to resident ratio rated the Town of Southold as the 4th safest community in New York State.

Reported Number of Arrests
Crime	2017	2018	2019
Aggravated Assault	10	10	11
Burglary	26	38	28
Larceny	178	171	171
Motor Vehicle Theft	8	7	7
Driving Under Influence	58	52	63
Domestic Violence	95	68	71
Rape	3	3	4
Controlled Substance Sale	1	1	0
Controlled Substance Possession	59	38	25
Total Arrests (Note: The total number of arrests includes other offenses not listed in this table.)	236	164	139

== Specialized units ==
=== Detective Division ===
The Detective Division is responsible for investigating the town's misdemeanor crimes and serious felonies. The division's sergeant and three detectives assist other officers, respond to serious crimes, and work closely with other local, state, and federal law enforcement agencies. Detectives are trained to handle crime scene investigations, including evidence identification, fingerprint collection, photography, and interview techniques. The division also investigates illegal drug crimes and participates in the Suffolk County District Attorney's office East End Drug Task Force. A detective is also assigned to the United States Marshal's Regional Fugitive Task Force to assist in the apprehension of fugitives.

=== Marine Division ===
The Marine Division patrols Southold's shoreline and enforces state Navigational Law, Environmental Conservation Law, and Southold Town Codes, including the regulating of fishing, wetlands, boats, and beaches. The division has three full-time bay constables with three boats to aid in marine search and rescue, beach patrol, and Homeland Security patrols. The department also maintains a Scuba Dive Team, composed of police officers who are certified for open water dives. The Scuba Dive Team assists in rescue operations, evidence recovery, and other police functions.

=== Highway Patrol Unit ===
The Highway Patrol Unit responds to traffic safety issues, including speeding, driving under the influence, and reckless driving complaints, throughout the town. Southold Police's Highway Patrol is responsible for patrolling portions of New York State's Route 25 and Suffolk County Route 48.

=== K-9 Unit ===
The Southold Police Department operates a single K-9 dog handled by Officer Frank Mele, who founded the unit in 2004 after the purchase of AJAX, a canine from North Fork Bank and Trust. After AJAX died in 2010, the Hudson City Savings Bank donated HUDZIN, a canine cross-trained in narcotics, to the department.

=== Community Response Unit ===
The Community Response Unit participates in several events and activities that bring the police department closer to the community. The unit hosts a Drug Abuse Resistance Education program, also known as the D.A.R.E. Program, to inform the community about the use of illegal drugs. The unit also offers child safety seat inspections, training in alcohol, drug, and crime prevention, and bicycle safety courses. Within the Community Response Unit is the department's Juvenile Aid Bureau, which works closely with local schools to educate students, parents, and teachers on drug and alcohol abuse. The Juvenile Aid Bureau also provides driver's education classes and assists school counselors.

=== Bicycle Patrol Unit ===
Formed in 2001, the Bicycle Patrol Unit has over 10 officers trained by the Suffolk County Police Department and certified by New York State Division of Criminal Justice Services as bicycle patrol officers. The unit patrols the town's major events and festivals, including an annual maritime festival.

== Equipment and technology ==
=== North Fork Dispatch Center ===
The Southold Police Department operates the primary emergency service dispatch center for the North Fork of Long Island. Located in the basement of the department's headquarters, the dispatch center services eight local fire departments and two police departments, including the Shelter Island Town Police Department. The center operates with no less than two radio operators at a time. Whenever services at the dispatch center are interrupted, calls automatically transfer to the East Hampton Village Police Department's emergency service dispatch center.

In 2017, local IGA supermarket owner Charles Reichert donated US$340,000 to renovate the department's dispatch center. The renovation included upgraded technology and the addition of a radio dispatch station, bringing the total up to four.

=== Vehicles ===
As of 2017, the Southold Police Department's patrol vehicles use a two-tone navy blue and white body. The department's patch is emblazoned on each front door with the words "POLICE" and "TOWN OF SOUTHOLD" spanning both doors of the vehicle. The words "DIAL 911 EMERGENCY" are printed on each rear side panel above the gas intake. Patrol supervisors use an all-white body with the same design as regular patrol vehicles. Traffic control vehicles use the department's older color scheme: an all-white body with two blue stripes arching from the rear tail lights to the front wheels. The words "TRAFFIC CONTROL" are printed in red on the vehicle's door above a blue "SOUTHOLD TOWN" inscription.

Southold Police Department vehicles use license plate numbers in the 800 range. Specialized units use license plate prizes, such as HP-0 (Highway Patrol), CRU-0 (Community Response Unit), M-0 (Marine Division).

Vehicle	Image	Units
Ford Police Interceptor Sedan		Sector Patrol; Highway Patrol; Community Response
Ford Explorer Special Service Vehicle		Sector Patrol
Ford Explorer Special Service Vehicle		Patrol Supervisor
Chevrolet Tahoe		Patrol Supervisor
Ford Crown Victoria Police Interceptor		Traffic Control
Ford F-59		Command
World Cat 270 HT		Marine Division
World Cat 266 SC		Marine Division
Boston Whaler 240 Dauntless		Marine Division

== Notable cases ==
- On October 14, 2014, Southold Police apprehended three suspects in a Peconic shooting where two people were seriously injured. The three suspects, Pedro Emilio Santamaria, Jeremias Nathaniel Recinos Torres, and Walter Vasquez, were all charged with first-degree assault after firing five bullets and attacking the victims with a machete. Santamaria and Torres were also charged with second-degree criminal possession of a weapon. Police officers connected the shooters with MS-13, while the two victims were affiliated with the rival gang Mara-18. Officers found Santamaria and Torres a short distance from the scene with a loaded .22 caliber pistol. Vasquez was later arrested at Greenport High School.
- In July 2015, a drunk driver crashed into a limousine on Suffolk County Route 48 in Cutchogue, killing four women and injuring five others. Steven Romeo, the driver of the truck, fled the scene of the crash on foot and was later apprehended by police officers. Romeo was charged with driving under the influence, with a blood alcohol content level of .06 at the time of the crash. Romeo was forced to pay a $500 fine and have his license suspended for 90 days. The limo driver, Carlos Pino, was charged with criminally negligent homicide, failure to yield the right of way, and other charges after attempting to make the illegal U-turn that caused the crash.

== Controversies ==
- In May 2003, Officer Steven Zuhoski was found liable by a federal jury for beating John Mims, a black resident, severely enough to cause unconsciousness and require stitches and staples to close his head wounds. The jury found that Zuhoski committed civil battery after he stopped Mims for suspected possession of a stolen vehicle. Despite this, the jurors cleared Officer Zuhoski, and Sergeant John Sinning, who was also involved in the incident, of their excessive force and racial bias charges. Both officers involved in the case were allowed to remain on full active duty.
- In June 2016, former Southold Police Officer Garrett Lake filed a wrongful termination lawsuit against the department. The lawsuit claimed that a number of arrests, including the arrest of fire chief David McKillop for drunk driving and limo driver Steven Romeo for a deadly accident, caused the Jamesport fire department and local Republican Party to "pressure" the Town Board into terminating Mr. Lake's employment. Despite Mr. Lake winning Suffolk County's “Top DWI Cop” award, Town Supervisor Scott Russell denied the allegations and cited job performance as the reason for termination.
- In September 2017, former Southold Police Officers Joseph Wysocki and David Hunstein filed a petition with the Suffolk County Supreme Court to challenge the Town's decision to terminate their employment. Both Wysocki and Hunstein sustained injuries while on duty and were deemed permanently unfit to perform the full duties of a police officer. Under New York General Municipal Law, Section 207, police officers and firefighters on disability are entitled to full salary and benefits. After Wysocki and Hunstein respectively received $950,000 and $600,000 in benefits, Town Supervisor Scott Russell stated in his 2016 town address that he wished to establish a time limit on disability leave.
- In November 2019, a boat accident at the James Creek left one person dead and three others injured. One of the injured, Frank DiStefano, alleged that the Southold Police Department made false statements when he was arrested and charged with operating the boat while intoxicated. The Suffolk County District Attorney's office obtained a toxicology report that showed DiStefano was not intoxicated at the time of the crash, clearing him of the charge.
- In May 2020, the department was under investigation for allegations that police officers dismissed phone calls about the retirement party of Sergeant Steven Zuhoski. Witnesses say they saw dozens of people on the Cutchogue property, violating state-mandated social distancing orders.

== In popular culture ==
- In the ABC television series Emergence, actress Allison Tolman plays the chief of a fictionalized Southold Town Police Department.

== See also ==
- List of law enforcement agencies in New York
- List of Long Island law enforcement agencies
