= FBI Police =

Security police protecting FBI facilities

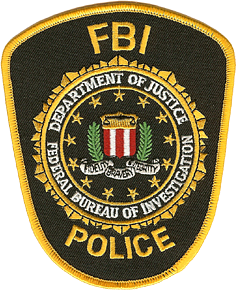
- FBI Police patch
- Active: c. 1980s – present
- Country: United States
- Agency: Federal Bureau of Investigation
- Type: Federal law enforcement Security police
- Part of: Security Division
- Motto: "Protecting those who protect America!"

Structure
- Police officers: Approx. 270
- Subunits: K-9; Patrol; ATV Patrol; Training; Emergency Response Team; Recruiting

Website
- Official website

The FBI Police is the uniformed security police of the United States Federal Bureau of Investigation (FBI) and is part of the Bureau's Security Division, tasked with protecting key FBI facilities, properties, personnel, visitors, information and operations from harm and may enforce certain laws and administrative regulations.

== Jurisdiction ==
They are endowed with full police powers of crime prevention, arrest, law enforcement and investigation within and around some key FBI facilities.

They have duty stations at the following locations:

Presence	Area
J. Edgar Hoover Building	Washington, D.C.
Washington Field Office	Washington, D.C.
FBI Academy	Quantico, Virginia
FBI Laboratory	Quantico, Virginia
New York Field Office	Lower Manhattan, New York
Criminal Justice Information Services Division	Clarksburg, West Virginia

The FBI has a cooperative agreement with the Metropolitan Police Department for the FBI Police to carry out protective duties outside of its regular patrol areas in Washington, D.C., of the J. Edgar Hoover building and the Washington Field Office.

== Duties and responsibilities ==
The primary role of the FBI Police is to deter terrorist attacks with the visible presence of a well trained, well equipped, professional police force; and provide protective security for FBI facilities from criminal acts and unauthorized access, including protecting FBI employees, official visitors and tourists.

FBI Police methods include several duties such as:

- Entrance and/or exit screening
- Patrolling in vehicles
- Patrolling on foot
- Patrolling on bicycle
- Use of explosives detection dogs
- Counter-surveillance
- Vehicle patrols include patrolling in cars, motorcycles and all-terrain vehicle patrols.

The FBI Police may be occasionally deployed to significant national security events, such as presidential inaugurations, the Super Bowl, conferences of world leaders as well as major political party conferences.

FBI Police routinely assist in the protection of the Director of the FBI and the Attorney General. FBI Police were deployed in support of the Hurricane Katrina effort in Louisiana and in 2010 deployed to Puerto Rico to assist with an arrest operation.

== Training ==
FBI Police recruits are required to complete a twelve-week Uniformed Police Officer Training Program at the Federal Law Enforcement Training Center followed by a four-week FBI Police Advanced Training Program at the FBI Academy and then complete five weeks of on-the-job training with a Field Training Officer in the Field Training Program.

== Benefits ==
=== Pay ===
Salaries in the FBI Police are determined via a basic pay plan set out under the General Schedule (GS). As of 2025, the pay levels are in place for FBI Police officers, GS-7, GS-9, GS-10 and GS-11.

Promotion opportunities within FBI Police come with increased pay, with the Colonel earning GS-15 pay.

Additionally, FBI Police officers are covered under the Federal Employee Retirement System (FERS) and do not receive enhanced Law Enforcement Retirement (6C).

Other benefits available to FBI Police officers include access to health insurance, life insurance, a thrift savings plan as well as providing officers with a gym/fitness program, transportation subsidies, tuition assistance and student loan repayments.

=== Class action lawsuit ===
The FBI Police are among the lowest paid federal law enforcement officers in the United States, and have the highest attrition rate at 17.9% (fiscal years 2009–2010). On August 2, 2007, a group of more than 100 FBI Police officers filed a class action complaint in the U.S. Court of Federal Claims for millions of dollars of back and future pay. The complaint alleged that the FBI had not complied with a 2002 statute, part of the FBI Reform Act, that mandated that the FBI police force be paid the same pay and benefits as members of the Uniformed Division of the United States Secret Service. The judge ruled against the FBI Police officers in February 2017. The FBI Director had not implemented the 2002 statute U.S. Code, Title 28, Section 540C to formally establish FBI Police.

== Gallery ==
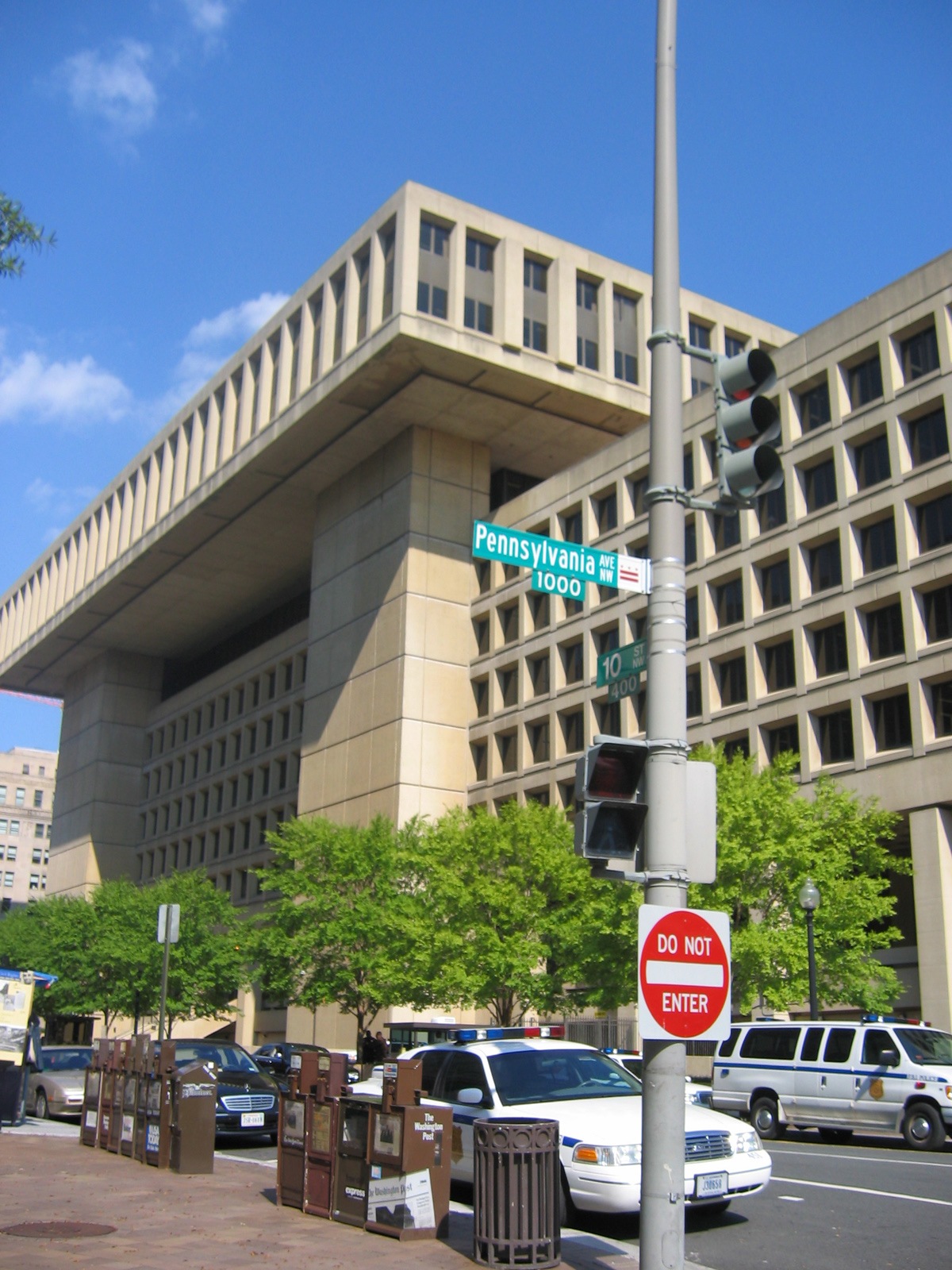
FBI Police vehicles in front of the J. Edgar Hoover Building

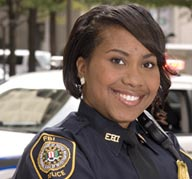
FBI policewoman

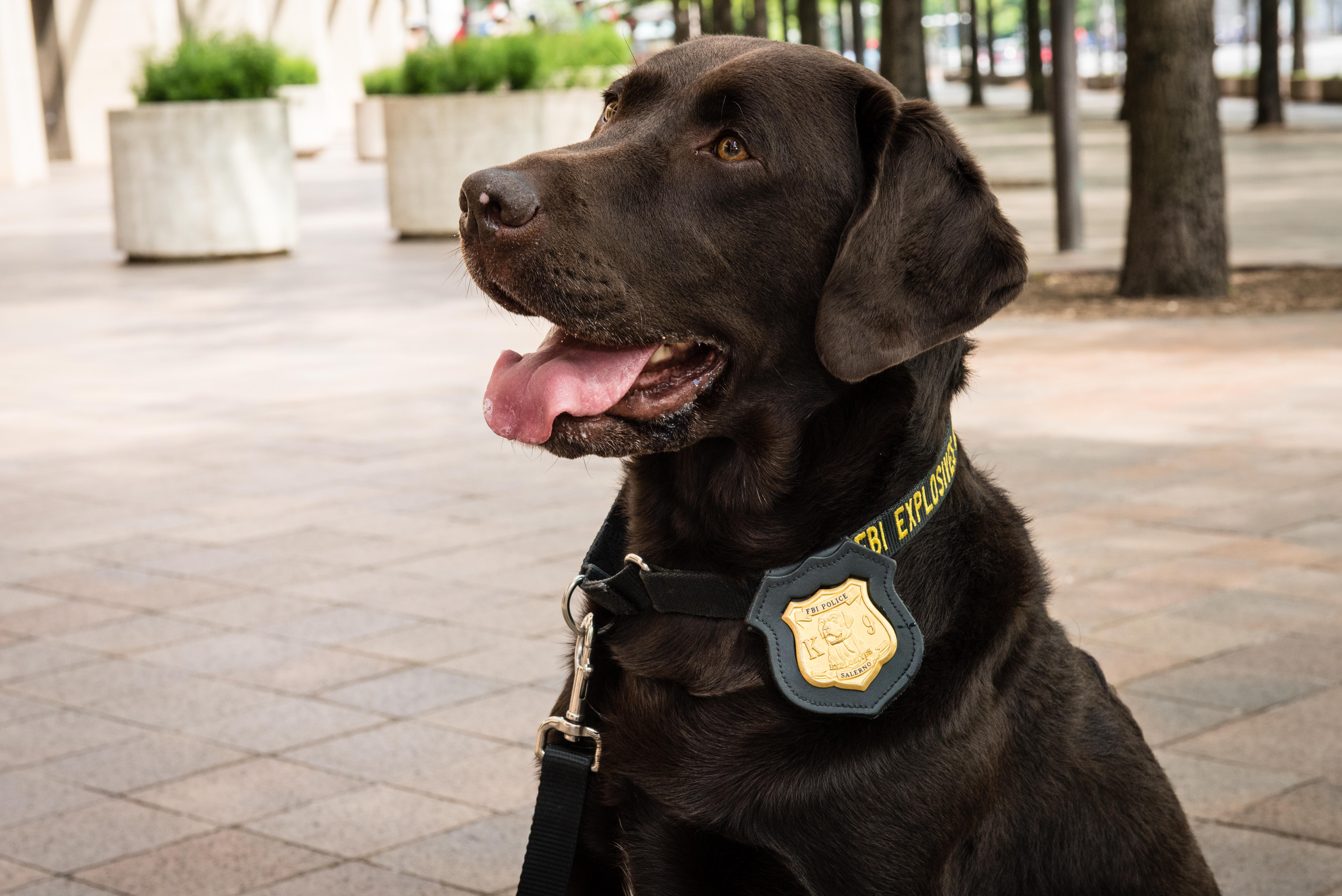
FBI Police Explosives Detection K-9

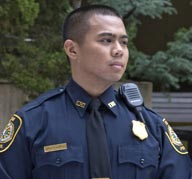
FBI policeman

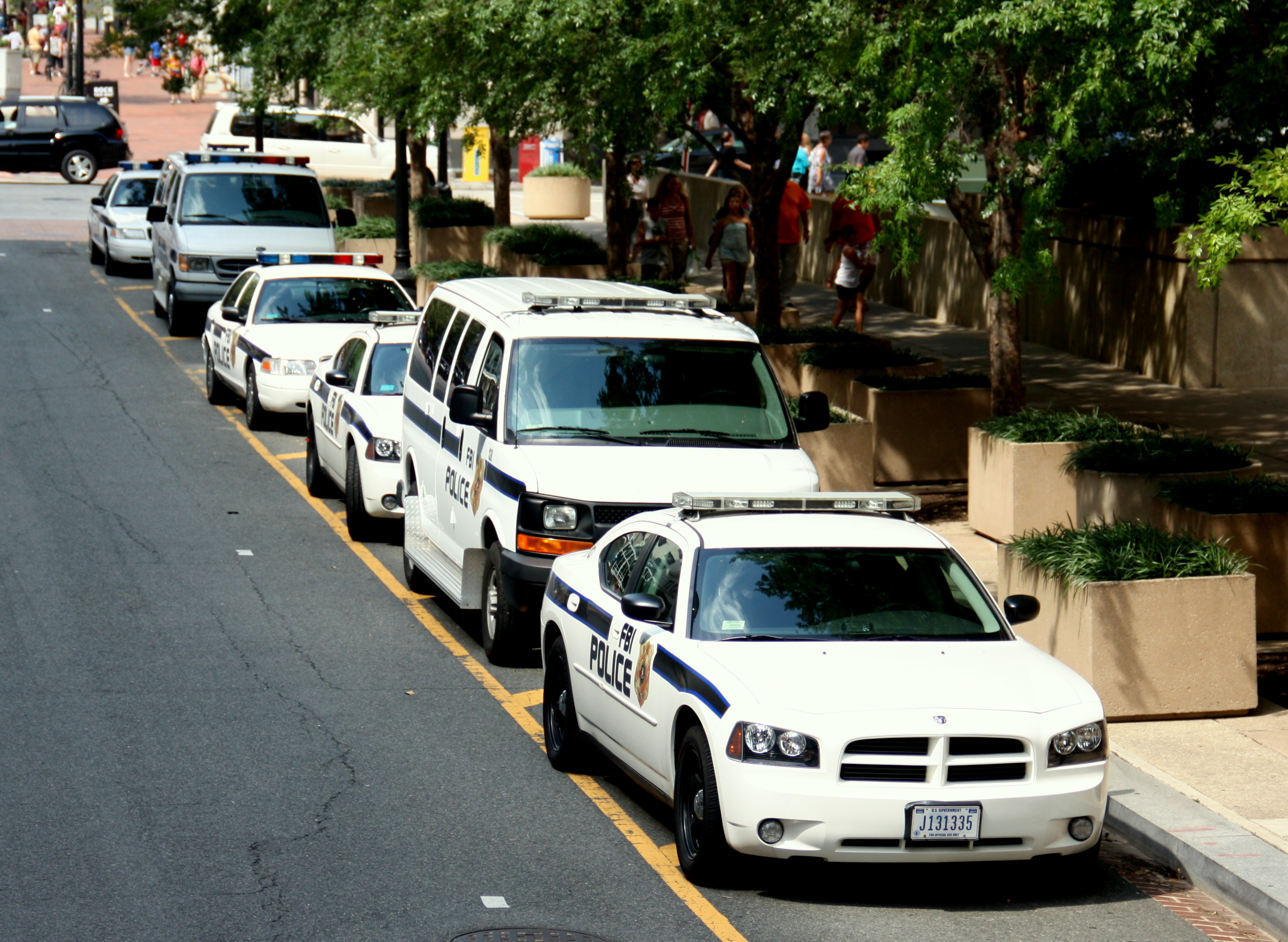
FBI Police vehicles with contemporary post-2008 markings

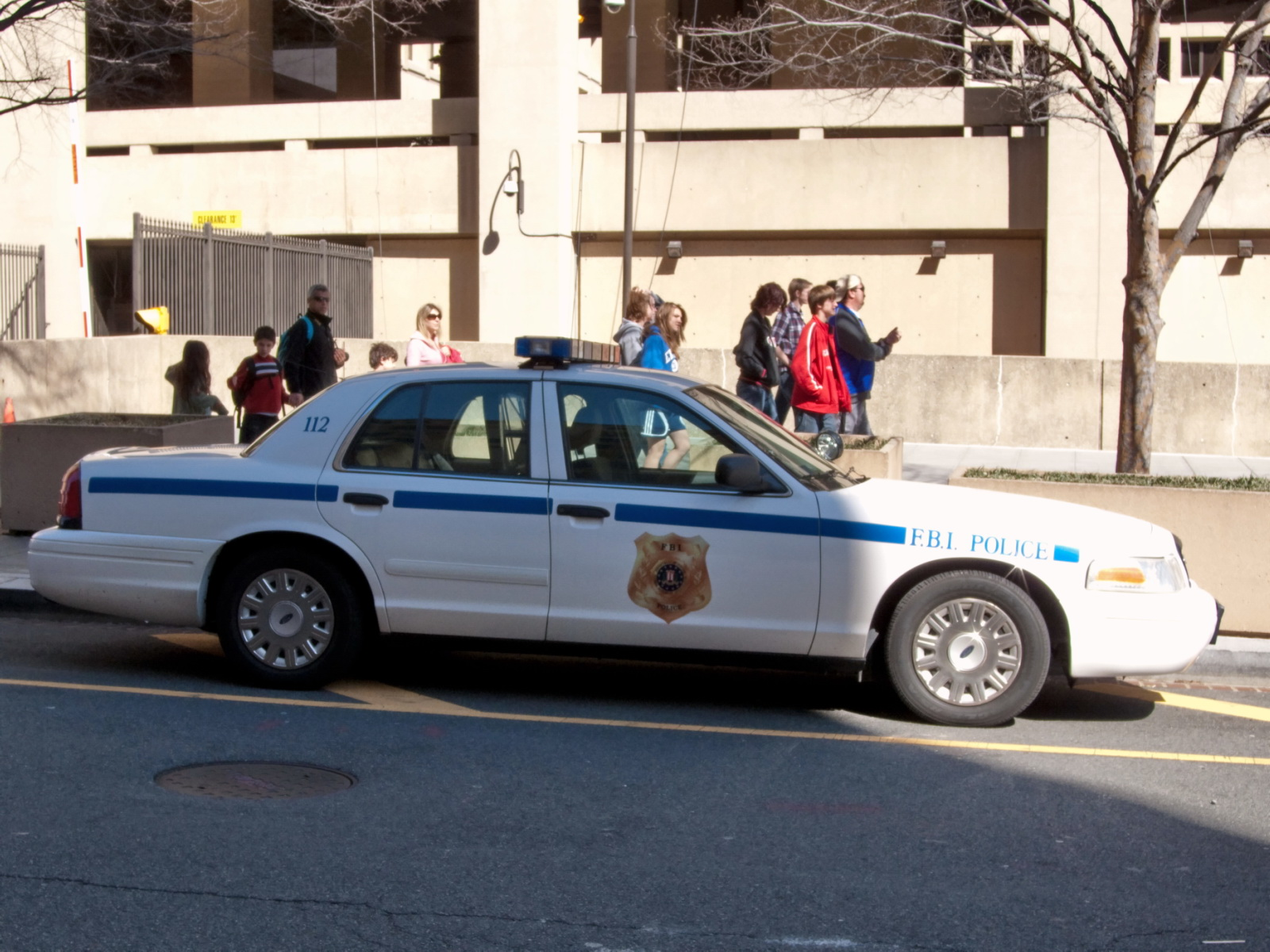
FBI Police Crown Victoria using pre-2008 markings

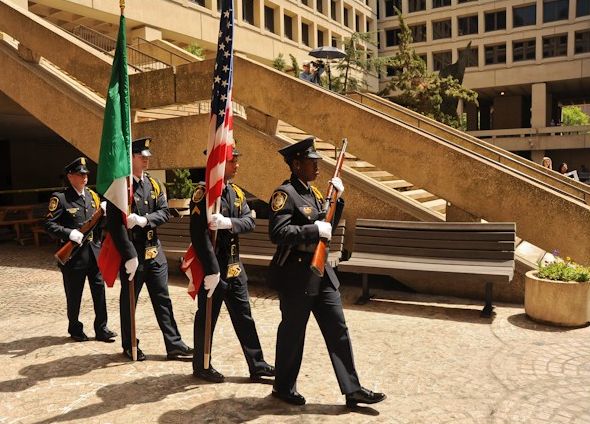
FBI Police Color Guard

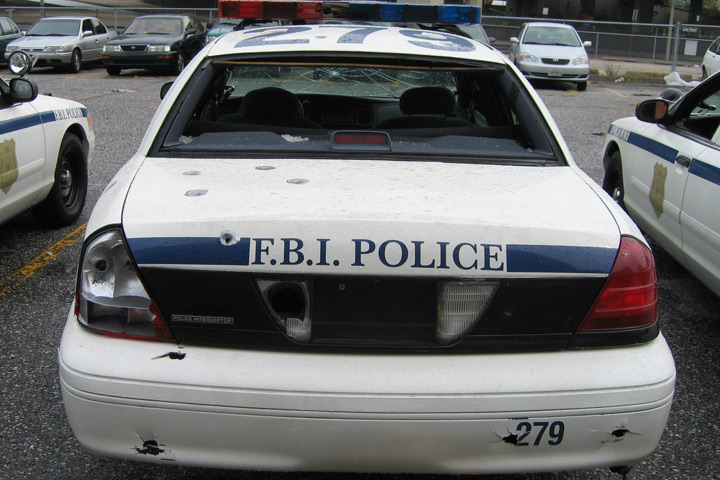
FBI Police vehicle prop from the film Live Free or Die Hard

== See also ==
- Federal law enforcement in the United States
- Federal Protective Service
- List of FBI field offices
- List of protective service agencies
