= Law enforcement in New York City =

Law enforcement in New York City is carried out by numerous federal, state, city and private agencies. New York City has the highest concentration of law enforcement in the United States.

== Powers ==
Members of New York City law enforcement agencies receive their powers and authority from New York State Criminal Procedure Law as listed:

- Police Officers who are listed under Article 2, §1.20 section 34 (A through V).
- Peace Officers who are listed under Article 2, §2.10 (1 through 85). The authority of peace officers are very limited by sections and/or subdivisions of the criminal procedure law, New York State penal law and employer restrictions.

== Authority ==
=== Police Officer ===
Police officers as listed and define under NYS Criminal Procedure Law 1.20 The authority of a police officers in New York State are the most broad.

=== Peace Officer ===
Peace officers are listed and defined under criminal procedure law 2.20. The authority of peace officers are limited by sections and/or subdivisions of the criminal procedure law, New York State penal law and employer restrictions. Peace officers are more restrictive and have limited roles as set forth by New York State laws and their employer.

=== NYC Special Patrolmen ===
Special patrolmen is unique in New York City, it is granted by the Police Commissioner of New York City Police Department NYPD to New York City agencies, as well as privately owned and operated companies & corporations who are responsible for maintaining safety and security at facilities and properties in connection with their special employment. Such designation confers very limited NYS Peace Officer authority upon the employee pursuant to New York State Criminal Procedure Law § 2.10 sub(27). The exercise of this authority is very limited to the employee's geographical area of employment. Special Patrolman are required to keep their status for the duration of employment and adhere with all rules promulgated by the Police Commissioner of the City of New York.

=== NYC Special Officer ===
Special officer are responsible for maintaining safety and security at facilities operate within specific locations such as city hospitals, shelters and some specific municipal buildings. Special officers have very limited New York State peace officers authority pursuant to New York State Criminal Procedure law 2.10, and employer restrictions, such designation is also limited to the employee's geographical area of employment.

== List of city agencies ==
Patch	Agency	Parent agency	Responsibility	Title	Personnel (approx.)
Patch of the New York City Police Department	New York City Police Department	-	Primary Policing agency within New York City	Police Officers	36,230
	New York City Department of Environmental Protection Police	New York City Department of Environmental Protection (DEP)	Protecting NYC's water supply system	Police Officers	200
Emblem of the New York City Fire Department	New York City Fire Department Fire Marshals	New York City Fire Department (FDNY)	Investigation of serious fires and arson within NYC	Police Officers	150
	New York City Sheriff's Office	New York City Department of Finance (DOF)	Enforcing of civil court orders and investigate tax and deed fraud in NYC	Peace Officers	150
	New York City Department of Correction	-	Care and custody of inmates in NYC correctional facilities	Peace Officers	5,619
	New York City Department of Probation	-	Supervision of people placed on probation by the NYC court system.	Peace Officers	60
	New York City Administration for Children's Services Police	New York City Administration for Children's Services (ACS)	Safety and security at New York City Administration for Children's Services facilities including juvenile justice detention centers	Special Officer	210
	New York City Business Integrity Commission	-	Regulating private catering industry, public wholesale markets businesses, and the shipboard gambling industry	Special Patrolmen	60
New DCAS Logo Final 2018-HZCombo2C	New York City Department of Citywide Administrative Services Police	New York City Department of Citywide Administrative Services (DCAS)	Safety and security at NYC Department of Citywide Administrative Services facilities.	Special Officer	15
NYC Health + Hospitals logo	New York City Health + Hospitals Police	New York City Health and Hospitals Corporation (HHC)	Safety and security of NYC Health and Hospital Corporation facilities	Special Officer	805
	New York City Department of Health and Mental Hygiene Police	New York City Department of Health and Mental Hygiene (DOHMH)	Safety and security at NYC Department of Health and Mental Hygiene facilities.	Special Officer	10
	New York City Department of Homeless Services Police	New York City Department of Homeless Services (DHS)	Safety and security at NYC Department of Homeless Facilities	Special Officer	380
	New York City Human Resources Administration Police	New York City Human Resources Administration (HRA)	Safety and security at NYC Department of Human Resources Administration Facilities	Special Officer	130
	New York City Department of Investigation	-	Investigating NYC governmental corruption & fraud	Special Patrolmen	35
	New York City Parks Enforcement Patrol	New York City Department of Parks and Recreation	Safety and security at NYC Parks and properties	Special Patrolmen	85
	New York City Police Department School Safety Division	New York City Police Department (NYPD)	Safety and security at NYC public schools	Special Patrolmen	5000
	New York City Department of Sanitation Police	New York City Department of Sanitation (DSNY)	Enforcement of NYC Sanitation laws and health code regulations	Special Patrolmen	80
New York City Taxi and Limousine Commission Police uniform shoulder patch	New York City Taxi and Limousine Commission Police	New York City Taxi and Limousine Commission (TLC)	Enforcement of NYC taxi licensing regulations concerning livery vehicles	Special Patrolmen	205

Since 1942, correction and probation services have been handled by separate agencies, not the sheriff's office.

The New York City Marshals, who are independent public officers enforcing civil debt, are not peace officers. New York City Marshals are regulated by the New York City Department of Investigation.

== State agencies ==
The Government of New York State operates one of the highest numbers of law enforcement agencies in the United States. While their jurisdiction stretches throughout New York City, many functions are duplicated by municipal agencies.

- New York State Office of the Attorney General
  - Criminal Justice Division - Investigations
- New York State Police
- New York State Department of Corrections and Community Supervision
  - Correction Officers and Parole Officers
- New York State Court Officers
- New York State Department of Environmental Conservation
  - New York State Department of Environmental Conservation Police
  - New York State Forest Rangers
- New York State Park Police
- New York State Division of Military and Naval Affairs
- New York State Department of Motor Vehicles
  - Division of Field Investigation
- New York State Office of Cannabis Management
  - New York State Cannabis Enforcement Division
- New York State Office of Children and Family Services
  - Bureau of Juvenile Detention Services
- New York State Office of Mental Health Police
- New York State Office for People With Developmental Disabilities Police
- New York State Office of Tax Enforcement
- New York Waterfront Commission Police

== Interstate agencies ==
These agencies have jurisdiction in both New York and neighboring states.

=== List of Agencies ===
Patch	Agency	Parent Agency	Function	Title	States	Number of Personnel
Patch of the NY NJ Port Authority	Port Authority of New York and New Jersey Police Department	Port Authority of New York and New Jersey	General law enforcement concerning PANYNJ	Police Officer	New York and New Jersey	Approx. 2200+
	Metropolitan Transportation Authority Police Department	Metropolitan Transportation Authority	General law enforcement concerning LIRR, MNR, and SIRR properties	Police officer	New York and Connecticut	Approx. 1,200

== Other public agencies ==
- MTA Bridge and Tunnel Officers
- Roosevelt Island Public Safety Department

== Federal agencies ==
- Administrative Office of the United States Courts
  - Probation and Pretrial Services System
- Amtrak Police Department
- United States Department of Agriculture
  - Forest Service Law Enforcement & Investigations
- United States Department of Defense
  - Army Civilian Police
  - Army Criminal Investigation Command
  - Army Military Police Corps
  - Air Force Office of Special Investigations
  - Air Force Police
  - Naval Criminal Investigative Service
  - Navy Police
- United States Department of Homeland Security
  - Coast Guard
  - Customs and Border Protection (Border Patrol and Office of Field Ops)
  - Federal Air Marshal Service
  - Federal Protective Service
  - Immigration and Customs Enforcement
    - Enforcement and Removal Operations (ERO)
    - Homeland Security Investigations (HSI)
  - Secret Service
  - Transportation Security Administration
- United States Department of the Interior
  - Fish and Wildlife Office of Law Enforcement
  - National Park Service Law Enforcement Rangers
  - United States Park Police
- United States Department of Justice
  - Bureau of Alcohol, Tobacco, Firearms and Explosives
  - Drug Enforcement Administration
  - Federal Bureau of Investigation
    - FBI Police
  - Federal Bureau of Prisons
  - United States Marshals Service
- United States Department of State
  - Diplomatic Security Service
- United States Department of the Treasury
  - Federal Reserve Police
  - IRS Criminal Investigation Division
  - United States Mint Police
- United States Department of Veterans Affairs Police
- United States Environmental Protection Agency Criminal Investigation Division
- United States Postal Inspection Service
- Smithsonian Police (for the George Gustav Heye Center and the Cooper Hewitt, Smithsonian Design Museum)

== Campus safety ==
Patch	Agency	Parent Agency	Function	Title	Number of Personnel
New York State University Police Dept. patch	New York State University Police	State University of New York (SUNY)	Responsible for the safety and security at SUNY campuses and facilities	Police Officers	Approx. 684
City University of New York Public Safety Dept. patch	City University of New York Public Safety Department	City University of New York (CUNY)	Responsible for the safety and security at CUNY campuses and facilities	Public Safety Officer	Approx. 715

== Non government / private Company ==
A number of private owned and operated communities have their own public safety. A limited number of personnel are New York state peace officers after completing a basic peace officer training course. This grants them very limited peace officer authority within their geographical area of employment in New York City.

Patch	Company	Parent Company	Function	Title	Number of Personnel
	Bay Terrace Public Safety Department	Cord Meyer Development LLC	Public Safety at Bay Terrace Shopping Center	Public Safety	-
	Big Six Towers Public Safety Department	Mitchell-Lama Cooperative Housing Company	Public Safety at Big Six Towers	Public Safety	Approx 8
	Co-op City Department of Public Safety	RiverBay Corporation	Public Safety at Co-op City	Special Patrolmen	Approx. 100
NY - Hunts Point Public Safety	Hunts Point Department of Public Safety	Hunts Point Cooperative Market	Public Safety at Hunts Point Market	Special Patrolmen	Approx. 20
	Morningside Heights Housing Corporation Department of Public Safety	Morningside Gardens	Public Safety at Morningside Gardens property	Public Safety	-
	New York Racing Association Peace Officers	New York Racing Association	Public Safety at NYRA facilities	Special Police	Approx 15
	Parkchester Department of Public Safety	Parkchester Preservation Management	Public Safety at Parkchester property	Special Patrolmen	Approx. 50
	Peter Cooper Village Stuyvesant Town Public Safety	Stuyvesant Town–Peter Cooper Village	Public Safety at Peter Cooper Village community	Public Safety	Approx 10
	Sea Gate Public Safety Department	Seagate Homeowners Association	Public Safety at Sea Gate private community	Public Safety	Approx. 10
	Spring Creek Towers Public Safety Department	Starrett City Associates	Public Safety at Spring Creek Towers	public safety	Approx 10

1. The Times Square Alliance has its own Public Safety Officers (PSOs) who act as the 'eyes and ears' for the local police. They are unarmed and their motto is: New York's Most Helpful.
2. The Flatiron 23rd Street Partnership BID has its own Public Safety Officers who act as ambassadors for the area. They patrol in uniform, during the daytime, seven days a week, regardless of weather.

== Prosecuting attorneys ==
In New York State, each county has an elected district attorney who is responsible for the prosecution of violations of New York state laws. Federal law in the city of New York is prosecuted by the U.S. Attorney for the Southern District of New York or the United States Attorney for the Eastern District of New York.

Office	Office holder	Jurisdiction	Duties
Bronx County District Attorney's Office	Darcel Clark	The Bronx	Prosecution for violations of New York state laws
Kings County District Attorney's Office	Eric Gonzalez	Brooklyn	Prosecution for violations of New York state laws
New York County District Attorney's Office	Alvin Bragg	Manhattan	Prosecution for violations of New York state laws
Queens County District Attorney's Office	Melinda Katz	Queens, New York	Prosecution for violations of New York state laws
Richmond County District Attorney's Office	Michael McMahon	Staten Island, New York	Prosecution for violations of New York state laws
Special Narcotics Prosecutor for the City of New York	Bridget G. Brennan	New York, Bronx, Kings, Queens, Richmond	Prosecution for violations of New York state narcotics laws
U.S. Attorney for the Southern District of New York	Jay Clayton	Manhatta, Bronx, Westchester, Putnam, Rockland, Orange, Dutchess, Sullivan	Prosecution for violations of U.S. federal laws
U.S. Attorney for the Eastern District of New York	Joseph Nocella Jr	Brooklyn, New York, Queens, New York, Richmond, Nassau, Suffolk	Prosecution for violations of U.S. federal laws

== Disbanded agencies ==
- Central Park Police
- ASPCA Humane Law Enforcement Division
- New York City Park Police
- New York Cross Harbor Railroad Police
- New York City Telegraph Bureau
- Defunct Agencies from the Bronx
  - Bronx County Safety Patrol
  - Kingsbridge Town Police Department
  - Town of Morrisania Police Department
  - West Farms Town Police Department
- Defunct Agencies from Brooklyn
  - Brooklyn Police Department
  - Brooklyn Bridge Police
  - Brooklyn Town Police Department
  - Bushwick Town Police Department
  - Flatbush Town Police Department
  - Flatlands Town Police Department
  - New Utrecht Town Police Department
- Defunct Agencies from Queens
  - Flushing Town Police Department
  - Long Island City Police Department
  - Jamaica Town Police Department
- Merged into the Metropolitan Transportation Authority Police
  - Long Island Rail Road Police Department
  - Metro-North Railroad Police Department
  - Staten Island Rapid Transit Authority Police Department
- Merged into the New York City Police Department:
  - New York City Housing Authority Police Department
  - New York City Board of Education Division of School Safety (See New York City Police Department School Safety Division)
  - New York City Transit Authority Police Department
- Merged into the New York City Sheriff's Office
  - Bronx County Sheriff's Office
  - Kings County Sheriff's Office
  - New York County Sheriff's Office
  - Queens County Sheriff's Office
  - Richmond County Sheriff's Office
- New York City Bureau of Water Supply Police (Succeeded by the New York City Department of Environmental Protection Police)
- Waterfront Commission of New York Harbor Police (interstate compact between New York and New Jersey that was disbanded in 2023. Succeeded by the New York Waterfront Commission Police at NYC ports and NJ State Police at New Jersey ports)

== See also ==
- Crime in New York City
- List of law enforcement agencies in New York
- Mary Shanley, 4th female detective
- New York City Police Department Auxiliary Police
