= Egglestone (disambiguation) =

Egglestone may refer to:

== Geographical locations ==
- Egglestone Abbey, abandoned Premonstratensian Abbey on the southern (Yorkshire) bank of the River Tees in England

== People with the surname Egglestone ==
- John Egglestone (1847–1912), Australian cricketer
- Pat Egglestone (born 1927), English former professional footballer
- Sarah Egglestone, member of the pop band A Touch of Class
- William Ecclestone or Egglestone (fl. 1610–1623), actor in English Renaissance theatre
- Rachel Egglestone-Evans (born 1980), British journalist and editor of Vintage Life Magazine

== See also ==
- Eggleston (disambiguation)
