= Law enforcement in New York =

Law enforcement in New York may refer to:

- Law enforcement in New York (state)
- Law enforcement in New York City
