= Eggleston (disambiguation) =

Eggleston is a village in County Durham, England.

Eggleston may also refer to:

- Eggleston, Minnesota, an unincorporated community in Goodhue County, Minnesota USA
- Eggleston, Virginia, an unincorporated community in Giles County, Virginia USA
- Egglestone Abbey, a ruined abbey in County Durham, England
- Eggleston Hall, a privately owned 19th-century country house near Barnard Castle
- Eggleston School, a listing on National Register of Historic Places in Nester Township, Michigan

== People with the surname ==
- Alan Eggleston (born 1941), Australian Senator
- Benjamin Eggleston (1816–1888), U.S. Representative from Ohio
- Charles Eggleston (1945–1968), photographer with United Press International
- Edward Eggleston (1837–1902), American historian and novelist
- Edward Mason Eggleston (1882-1941), painter, commercial illustrator in New York City
- Elizabeth Eggleston (1934–1976), Australian activist, author, lawyer and champion for Indigenous Australians
- Frederic Eggleston (1875–1954), Australian lawyer, politician and diplomat
- Geoffrey Eggleston (1944–2008), Australian poet
- George Cary Eggleston (1839–1911), American writer
- Jeffrey Eggleston (born 1984), American runner
- John W. Eggleston (1886–1976), chief justice of the Virginia Supreme Court of Appeals
- Joseph Dupuy Eggleston (1867–1953), seventh President of Virginia Polytechnic Institute and State University
- Joseph Eggleston (1754–1811), American planter, soldier, and politician
- Logan Eggleston (born 2000), American volleyball player
- Mack Eggleston (1896–1980), U.S. baseball player
- Ralph Eggleston (1965–2022), art director and writer at Pixar Animation Studios
- Rushad Eggleston (born 1979), contemporary improvisational cellist
- Tommy Eggleston (1920–2004), English footballer and manager
- Verna Eggleston, American public servant
- Neil Eggleston (born 1953), American attorney who served as the White House Counsel under President Barack Obama
- Willard Webster Eggleston (1863–1935), American botanist
- Wilfrid Eggleston (1901–1986), Canadian journalist and chief censor for Canada
- William Eggleston (born 1939), American photographer

== See also ==
- Egglestone (disambiguation)
