= New York City Marshal =

New York City Marshals are civil litigation enforcement officers of New York City who are appointed by the mayor to five-year terms. They are independent public officers and do not collect a salary during their tenure in office. By law, no more than 83 city marshals may be appointed by a mayor.

Marshals primarily enforce orders from civil court cases, including collecting on judgments, seizing property, and carrying out evictions. Marshals are regulated by the Mayor's Committee on New York City Marshals and the Department of Investigation. Marshals perform similar civil enforcement duties that are performed by deputy sheriffs of the New York City Sheriff's Office, but unlike the deputy sheriffs, they are not city employees. On an annual basis, city marshals must pay the city of New York $1,500 plus 4.5 percent of the fees they receive for collecting judgments.

== History ==
In 1938, the New York City Marshals were placed under the supervision of the New York City Department of Investigation, and in 1954, the City of New York Bureau of City Marshals (later renamed the Mayor's Committee on New York City Marshals) was established. By 1968, the New York City Civil Court Act's Article 16 made city marshals officers of the Civil Court of New York City, which allowed Appellate Divisions for the First and Second Judicial Departments of the court to supervise the marshals. While they were still appointed by the mayor of New York City, the Judicial Court could supervise and remove the appointed marshals from office.

== Duties ==
New York City Marshals provide civil law enforcement duties by collecting court ordered fees, fees which are set by statute, from the private litigants whose judgments they enforce, and they also retain five percent of any money they collect on judgments. City marshals may, depending on the court order brought to them by the winning litigant, seize money, movable property (for instance, inventory from a business), vehicles (as is the case with unpaid parking tickets) and return possession of rental premises to the landlord (also known as eviction). Marshals collectively perform approximately 25,000 evictions per year.

== Line of duty deaths ==
- Marshal Freeman Mason – Died in the line of duty on March 13, 1984 while performing an eviction in Brooklyn.
- Marshal Erskine Bryce – Died in the line of duty on August 21, 2001 while performing an eviction in Brooklyn.

== See also ==
- Marshal
- History of the New York City Police Department during the 19th Century
- Law enforcement in New York City
