= New York City Business Integrity Commission =

Government agency

Business Integrity Commission
- BIC

Commission overview
- Formed: August 19, 2002
- Type: Regulatory/Law Enforcement
- Jurisdiction: New York City
- Employees: 85 (2020)
- Commission executive: Asim Rehman, Commissioner and Chair
- Key documents: New York City Charter; Local Law 21 of 2002
- Website: www.nyc.gov/bic

The Business Integrity Commission (BIC) is the agency of the New York City government responsible for regulating the private carting industry, public wholesale markets businesses, and the shipboard gambling industry. Its purpose is to combat corruption in these industries from organized crime, and was created from the 2001 Organized Crime Control Commission, itself created from the 1996 Trade Waste Commission, the Markets Division in the Small Business Services Department, and the Gambling Commission.

It consists of a chairman appointed by the mayor and of the commissioners of the Police Department, the Department of Consumer and Worker Protection, the Department of Investigation, the Department of Small Business Services and the Department of Sanitation, or their designees.

== Inspectors and Investigators ==
The inspectors and investigators of the New York City Business Integrity Commission are designated as peace officers by the chairman of such commission; pursuant to section 210(82) of the NYS criminal procedure law. As Peace Officers (Inspectors and investigators) they are tasked with conducting investigations of accidents involving private carting trucks, criminal complaints and also affect arrest of violators of New York State Penal Law, and issue civil and criminal summonses. They also perform enforcement of the rules and regulations governing the private carting industry and or the city owned public wholesale markets in New York City. These inspectors and investigators also conduct other special investigations. These may include joint investigations with the NYPD against businesses.

The inspectors are unarmed in the performance of their duties.

== See also ==
- New York City Office of Administrative Trials and Hearings (OATH), for hearings conducted on summonses for quality of life violations issued by the Commission
- New York State Gaming Commission

== Commissioners & Chairs ==
Commissioner	Mayor	Took office	Left office	Notes
Dan Brownell	Bill de Blasio	2014	2019	
Noah Genel	Bill de Blasio	2019	2021	
Elizabeth Crotty	Eric Adams	2022	2026	
Asim Rehman	Zohran Mamdani	2026		
