= Vintage (disambiguation) =

Vintage is a process or quality in wine-making.

Vintage may also refer to:

== Design ==
- Vintage design, manmade objects representative of or dating from an earlier period

== Places ==
- Vintage, Pennsylvania, an unincorporated community in the United States

== In businesses and organizations ==
- Vintage Books, an American book publisher, an imprint of the Random House Group
- Vintage FM, a radio station in Penrith, New South Wales, Australia
- Vintage High School, Napa, California, U.S.

== In entertainment ==
=== Music ===
- Vintage dance, authentic recreation of historical dance styles
- "Vintage", a song by Allie X from the album CollXtion II

Artists

- Vintage (band), a Russian pop band

Albums

- Vintage (Canned Heat album), 1970
- Vintage (East West album), 2003
- Vintage (Michael Bolton album), 2003
- Vintage (Toshiko Akiyoshi and Lew Tabackin album), 2008
- Vintage: The Very Best of Moby Grape, a 1993 album

=== Other ===
- The Vintage, a 1957 American crime drama film
- Vintage, a "Magic: The Gathering" card game tournament format sanctioned by the DCI

== See also ==
- Antique, a manmade object that is at least 100 years old
- Retro style, an outdated style that has returned to fashion / new clothing that is vintage-inspired
- Vintage amateur radio, subset of amateur radio hobby centered on the use of older equipment
- Vintage car, an old automobile
- Vintage clothing, garments originating from a previous era
- Vintage computer, an old computer
- Vintage Life, women's fashion and lifestyle magazine
