= Law enforcement in New York (state) =

Overview of law enforcement in the U.S. state of New York

Law enforcement in New York State is primarily conducted by Police Officers employed by State, City, County Police departments. A number of State, City, Educational, and private companies employ Peace/special patrolmen.

== Powers ==
New York law enforcement agencies receive their authority from the New York State Criminal Procedure Law as listed:

- Police Officers who are listed under Article 2, §1.20 section 34 (A through V).
- Peace Officers who are listed under Article 2, §2.10 (1 through 85). The authority of peace officers are very limited by sections and/or subdivisions of the criminal procedure law, New York State penal law and employer restrictions.

== Authority ==
=== Peace officers ===
Peace officers are listed and defined under criminal procedure law 2.20. The authority of peace officers are very limited by sections and/or subdivisions of the criminal procedure law, New York State penal law and employer restrictions.

=== Special patrolmen ===
Designation as a NYC special patrolmen AKA [special officer] is unique in New York City, it is granted by the Police Commissioner of New York City Police Department NYPD to New York City agencies, private owned and operated companies Non government who are responsible for maintaining safety and security at facilities and properties in connection with their special duties of employment. Such designation confers very limited NYS Peace Officer authority upon the employee pursuant to New York State Criminal Procedure Law § 2.10 sub(27). The exercise of this authority is very limited to the employee's geographical area of employment and only while such employee is working, and also by sections and/or subdivisions of the criminal procedure law, New York State penal law and employer restrictions.

== Firearms ==
Peace officers, as listed and defined under the Criminal Procedure Law 2.10 ( 1 through 85 ), must be appropriately licensed and authorized by their specific agency, department or company to carry a firearm and are limited by title, employment and subdivision within criminal procedure law 2.10, and which is clearly stated by New York State legislation (as of 01/13/2020 the NYS Assembly recommitted and this bill was deleted IE: enacting clause stricken ... as posted on the bill). For example, in subdivision 27 of criminal procedure law 2.10 which pertain to all New York City Special Patrolmen (Peace Officer). In this section it clearly states that nothing in this subdivision shall be deemed to authorize such officer to carry, possess, repair or dispose of a firearm unless the appropriate license therefor has been issued pursuant to section 400.00 of the penal law." Peace officers who are authorized by their specific agency or department to carry a firearm are required to adhere to all training standards, in accordance with criminal procedure law 2.30, and maybe required to obtain a separate firearm license pursuant to penal law 400.00, however, peace officers that are limited by specific subdivisions of criminal procedure law 2.10 are not authorized to carry a firearm in any capacity unless they apply for a firearms license under penal law 400.00.

=== Agencies ===
Listed are some agencies that do authorize their peace officers to carry a firearm:

- MTA Bridges and Tunnels (TBTA)
- New York State Court Officers
- New York State Department of Corrections and Community Supervision
- New York State Office of Tax Enforcement
- New York City Department of Correction
- New York City Department of Investigation
- New York City Sheriff's Office

Listed are some agencies that do not authorize their peace / special officers to carry a firearm:

- New York State Office of Mental Health Police
- New York State Office for People With Developmental Disabilities Police
- New York City Police Department School Safety Division
- New York City Administration for Children's Services Police
- New York City Department of Health and Hospitals Police
- New York City Human Resources Administration Police
- New York City Department of Homeless Services Police
- New York City Department of Health and Mental Hygiene Police
- New York City Parks Enforcement Patrol
- New York City Taxi and Limousine Commission

== Non government / Private Company ==
Some privately owned and operated companies have their own public safety department, and allow their peace / special patrolmen to carry a firearm only while actively working for said companies. They must be licensed by the New York City Police Department (Pistol Licensing Section) to be in compliance with penal law 400.00:

Listed are a few such agencies:

- Co-op City Department of Public Safety
- Hunts Point Department of Public Safety
- Parkchester Department of Public Safety
- New York Racing Association Peace Officers
- Spring Creek Towers Public Safety.

Designation as a special patrolmen is unique to New York City, it is granted by the New York City Police Commissioner under New York City Administrative Code §14-106. The powers of Special Patrolmen are appointed in connection with special duties of employment, and such designation confers very limited Peace Officer powers upon the employee pursuant to New York State Criminal Procedure Law § 2.10(27).

The exercise of this authority is limited to the employee's geographical area of employment and only while such employee is actually on duty as listed in Chapter 13 subsection (C): Special Patrolmen.

Special patrolmen who are armed must be issued a firearm license for on duty use only, to be in compliance with penal law 400.00 and the New York City Police Department ( pistol license section ) rules and regulations.

== Other equipment ==
The equipment carried by peace officers depends on their duties and their agency's discretion. Most uniformed peace officers carry a baton, can of pepper spray, pair of handcuffs, a whistle, a flashlight, and a portable radio. In addition, certain peace officer agencies allow their officers to carry other equipment, such as tasers. Peace officer agencies can allow/ban certain equipment carried by officers, for example, NYPD Auxiliary Police officers are only equipped with a baton, handcuffs, flashlight, and whistle, while NYPD School Safety Agents only carry handcuffs, a flashlight, and a whistle.

== Uniform ==
Uniforms worn by peace officers differ from agency to agency. Most peace officers wear a uniform that has a dark blue shirt and dark blue pants with a dark blue peaked (eight-point) cap and black boots or shoes. Another popular uniform worn by officers has a light blue shirt with dark blue pants with a dark blue peaked (eight-point) cap with black boots or shoes.

However, there are other colors and types of uniforms worn by officers, including grey, green, and black shirts and grey, green, and black pants.

Also, most officers wear a hat when on duty. The hats worn by officers differ in shape, size, type, brand, and color, ranging from a traditional eight-point cap, to stetsons, to a baseball style cap.

In addition, officers in certain specialized units in departments may wear a different style uniform compared to the uniform worn by patrol officers. A major piece of the peace officer uniform is the badge (also known as a shield in New York), which is usually worn on the left or right chest of the shirt or jacket. The shape and color of badges differ between rank and department.

== Training ==
The amount and type of training given to peace officers differs between agencies. The Municipal Peace officer Training Council (MPTC) prescribes a minimum of 700 hours of training for police officers in New York. Peace officers, which are considered specialists in a particular type of employment and title require less training (180 hours) but are usually provided with agency-specific or mission-specific training by their employer.

MPTC's Basic Course for Peace Officers is different to the Basic Course for Police Officers and minus the modules not relevant to the unique nature of the peace officer's employment. For example, MPTC does not require peace officers to receive extensive training as part of there employment, police officers are required by state law to receive such training.

All training courses for peace officers include training in criminal law, police science, authorities of peace officers, some physical training, laws of arrest, and defensive tactics. Peace officers who are authorized by their employer to carry a firearm must complete the 47 hour firearms course and must by license as required by New York State (CPL 400.00) before they can carry a firearm. They also re-qualify yearly.

== Limitation on disclosure ==
Records made to a municipality's E911 system shall not be made available to or obtained by any entity or person, other than limited exceptions.

== See also ==
- Law of New York
- List of law enforcement agencies in New York
- Briana's Law
