= New York City Department of Probation =

New York City government agency

- DOP
- Patch

Department overview
- Formed: 1928
- Jurisdiction: New York City
- Employees: 844 (FY 2026)
- Annual budget: $115.7 million (FY 2026)
- Department executives: Sharun Goodwin, Commissioner; Sekou Ma'at, First Deputy Commissioner
- Website: www.nyc.gov/probation

The New York City Department of Probation (DOP) is the department of the government of New York City responsible for providing supervision for adults and juveniles placed on probation by judges in the Supreme, Criminal, and Family courts. In addition, Probation officers are responsible for preparing background reports that assist judges in determining appropriate sentences for adult offenders and juvenile delinquents.

== Powers and Authority ==
Probation Officers are New York State peace officers. Its regulations are compiled in title 42 of the New York City Rules.

== See also ==
- List of law enforcement agencies in New York
- Law enforcement in New York City
