= New York City Office of Administrative Trials and Hearings =

Government agency

Office of Administrative Trials and Hearings
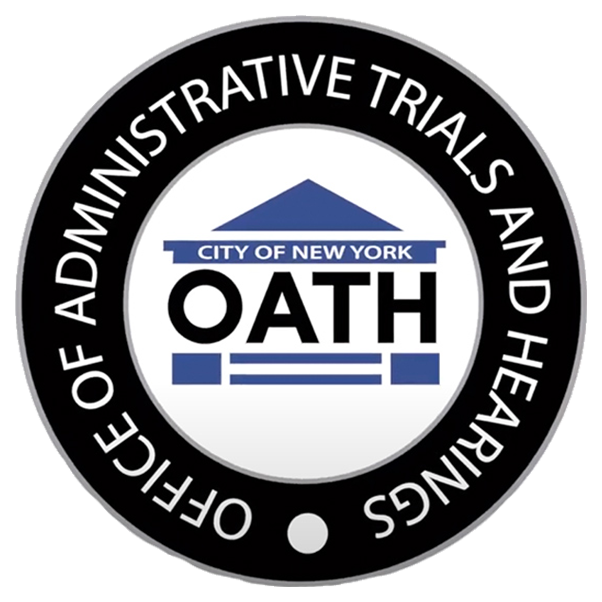

Court overview
- Formed: July 25, 1979
- Jurisdiction: New York City
- Headquarters: 100 Church Street, New York, NY 10007
- Employees: 456 (FY 2026)
- Annual budget: $81.6 million (FY 2026)
- Court executive: Vilda Vera Mayuga, Commissioner and Chief Administrative Law Judge
- Key document: New York City Charter
- Website: nyc.gov/oath

The New York City Office of Administrative Trials and Hearings (OATH) is an administrative office of the New York City government. It is a non-mayoral executive agency and is not part of the state Unified Court System.

Administrative trials neither preclude, nor are precluded by, criminal charges by the state and/or civil lawsuits by complainants against the respondent individuals and businesses.

== Structure and jurisdiction ==
OATH adjudicates for all city agencies unless otherwise provided for by executive order, rule, law or pursuant to collective bargaining agreements. OATH is composed of the:

- Trials Division (OATH Tribunal)
  - New York City Loft Board
- Hearings Division
  - Environmental Control Board Hearings (Environmental Control Board, ECB), for hearings conducted on summonses for quality of life violations issued by the
    - Department of Sanitation (which accounts for two-thirds of ECB summonses)
    - Department of Consumer and Worker Protection (DCWP) has jurisdiction over disputes between businesses and the DCA or consumers, as well as some licensing cases that originate with the Business Integrity Commission, the NYPD, the American Society for the Prevention of Cruelty to Animals, and the FDNY
    - NYPD
    - Department of Buildings
    - FDNY
    - Department of Transportation
    - Department of Health and Mental Hygiene for rodent, pest, mosquito and water cooling towers
    - Department of Environmental Protection
    - Department of Parks and Recreation
    - Business Integrity Commission
    - Landmarks Preservation Commission
  - Health and Consumer Hearings (Health Tribunal), for hearings conducted on summonses issued by the
    - Department of Health and Mental Hygiene
    - Department of Consumer and Worker Protection
  - Taxi and Vehicle for Hire Hearings (Taxi and Limousine Tribunal), for hearings conducted on summonses for TLC rules and regulations violations issued by the
    - Taxi and Limousine Commission (TLC)
    - NYPD
    - Port Authority of New York and New Jersey
- Board of Standards and Appeals (BSA), for hearings on
  - applications for zoning variances and special-use permits
  - appeals of proposals denied by the Buildings, Fire or Business Services departments
  - applications from the Buildings and Fire departments to modify or revoke certificates of occupancy

The Environmental Control Board (ECB) is composed of thirteen members: the chairperson is the OATH Chief Administrative Law Judge (ALJ), six are commissioners of city agencies, six are citizens who are experts in the fields of water pollution control, business, real estate and noise but includes two general citizen representatives. Although the ECB is empowered to impose penalties under the New York City Charter and has promulgated penalty schedules, the ECB is in the process of repealing all penalty schedules in its rules so that they can be relocated to the rules of the enforcement agencies with primary rulemaking and policymaking jurisdiction with the expertise to adopt appropriate penalties to address violations, and help clarify to the public that OATH ECB is a neutral third party that hears and tries cases brought by other City agencies and is not an enforcement agency.

== Procedure ==
Unlike state criminal courts (such as the New York City Criminal Court), OATH does not guarantee a right to counsel, a fine is the most serious outcome, and a failure to appear results in a default judgment not an arrest warrant. When an individual or business is fined and does not attend a hearing of the Environmental Control Board (ECB) or pay within the required time period, the ECB adds a penalty and oversees interest.

== Related courts ==
OATH adjudicates for all city agencies unless otherwise provided for by executive order, rule, law or pursuant to collective bargaining agreements. However, except as to issues involving employee discipline, OATH hearings are the exception rather than the rule. In 2003, New York City had roughly 61 city agencies employing an estimated 500 lawyers as administrative law judges and/or hearing officers/examiners. Non-OATH tribunals that also operate in New York City include:

- The city DOF Parking Adjudications Division (Parking Violations Bureau) adjudicates parking violations.
- The state DMV Traffic Violations Bureau adjudicates non-parking traffic violations.
- The city Tax Appeals Tribunal adjudicates disputes regarding city-administered taxes other than real estate assessment claims, which are adjudicated by the city Tax Commission.

The New York City Criminal Court and New York City Civil Court are part of the New York State Unified Court System.

== History ==
OATH was created by Mayor Ed Koch with Executive Order 32 on July 25, 1979, and by an amendment to the New York City Charter at the general election on November 8, 1988. The Board of Standards and Appeals was consolidated with OATH by an amendment to the charter effective July 1, 1991. The Environmental Control Board was moved from the authority of the Department of Environmental Protection to OATH effective November 23, 2008. Fidel Del Valle was appointed as commissioner and chief judge of OATH by mayor de Blasio in 2014. Executive Order 18 of June 23, 2016 transferred all adjudications of the DCA Tribunal to OATH effective August 22, 2016.
