= Vincent Sapienza =

American civil servant

Chief Operating Officer of the New York City Department of Environmental Protection
- Incumbent
- Assumed office January 31, 2022
- Mayor: Eric Adams

Commissioner of the New York City Department of Environmental Protection
- In office October 3, 2017 – January 31, 2022
- Mayor: Bill de Blasio; Eric Adams
- Preceded by: Emily Lloyd
- Succeeded by: Rohit T. Aggarwala

Personal details
- Education: Columbia University (BS); Hofstra University (MBA)

Vincent Sapienza is an American civil servant who is the Chief Operating Officer of the New York City Department of Environmental Protection. From 2017 to 2022, he was the agency's Commissioner.

== Biography ==
Sapienza graduated from Columbia University with a B.S. and an MBA from Hofstra University. He joined the City's Department of Environmental Protection (DEP) after graduation in 1983.

Sapienza was Deputy Commissioner of the DEP for its Bureau of Engineering Design and Construction, overseeing the construction of the New York City Water Tunnel No. 3 and the Croton Water Filtration Plant from 2014 to 2016, as well as Deputy Commissioner for the Bureau of Wastewater Treatment, which led to the creation of a citywide resiliency plan, from 2009 to 2014.

In 2016, Sapienza was named Acting Commissioner by then Mayor Bill de Blasio. On October 3, 2017, he was named to the position in a permanent capacity. He oversaw the $1 billion repair of the Delaware Aqueduct which involves the construction of a 2.5-mile bypass from the leaking portions inside the original tunnel. In 2020, he was named one of the "Energy & Environment Power 100" by City & State. However, his role in handling the 2019 sewage leak in Queens and the 2021 Hurricane Ida crisis was also criticized by the New York City Council.

In January 2022, Mayor Eric Adams named Sapienza chief operating officer of the DEP.
