= New York City Department of Environmental Protection =

New York City government agency

Department overview
- Jurisdiction: New York City
- Headquarters: 59-17 Junction Boulevard Elmhurst, Queens
- Employees: 5,613 (FY 2026)
- Annual budget: $1.88 billion (FY 2026)
- Department executives: Lisa Garcia, Commissioner of Environmental Protection; Anastasios Georgelis, Acting Chief Operating Officer
- Key document: New York City Charter
- Website: www.nyc.gov/dep

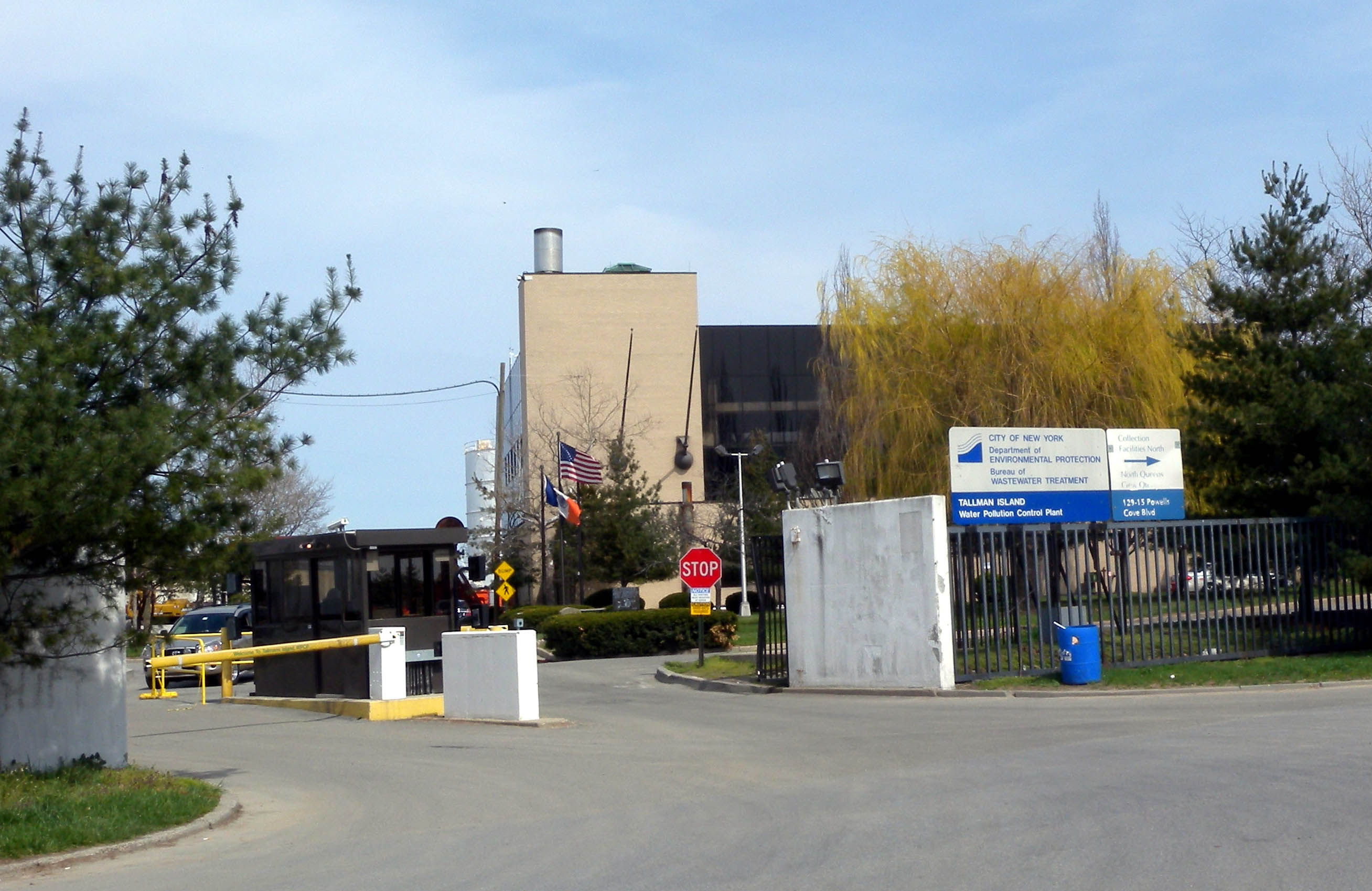
Tallman Island plant

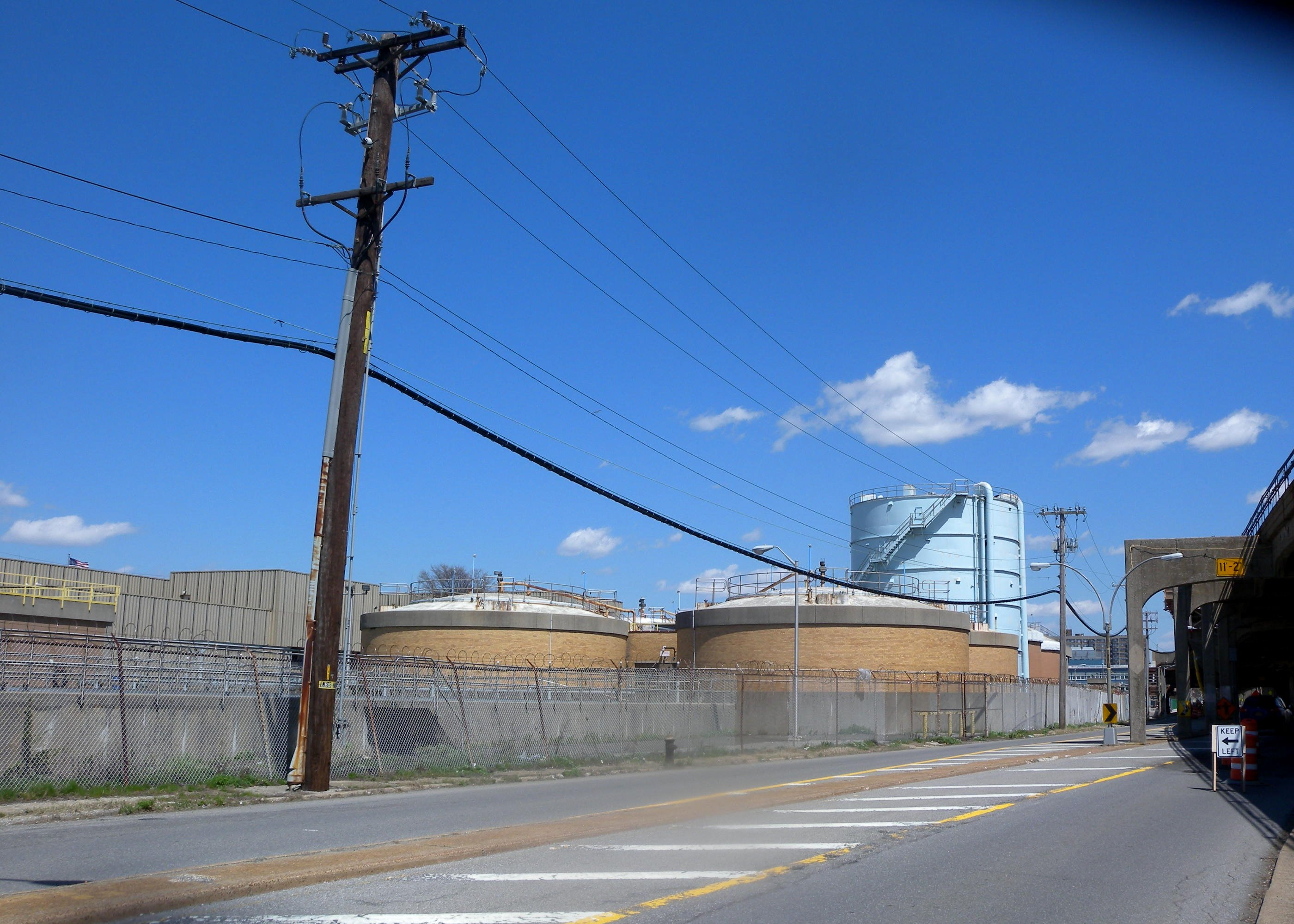
Rockaway plant

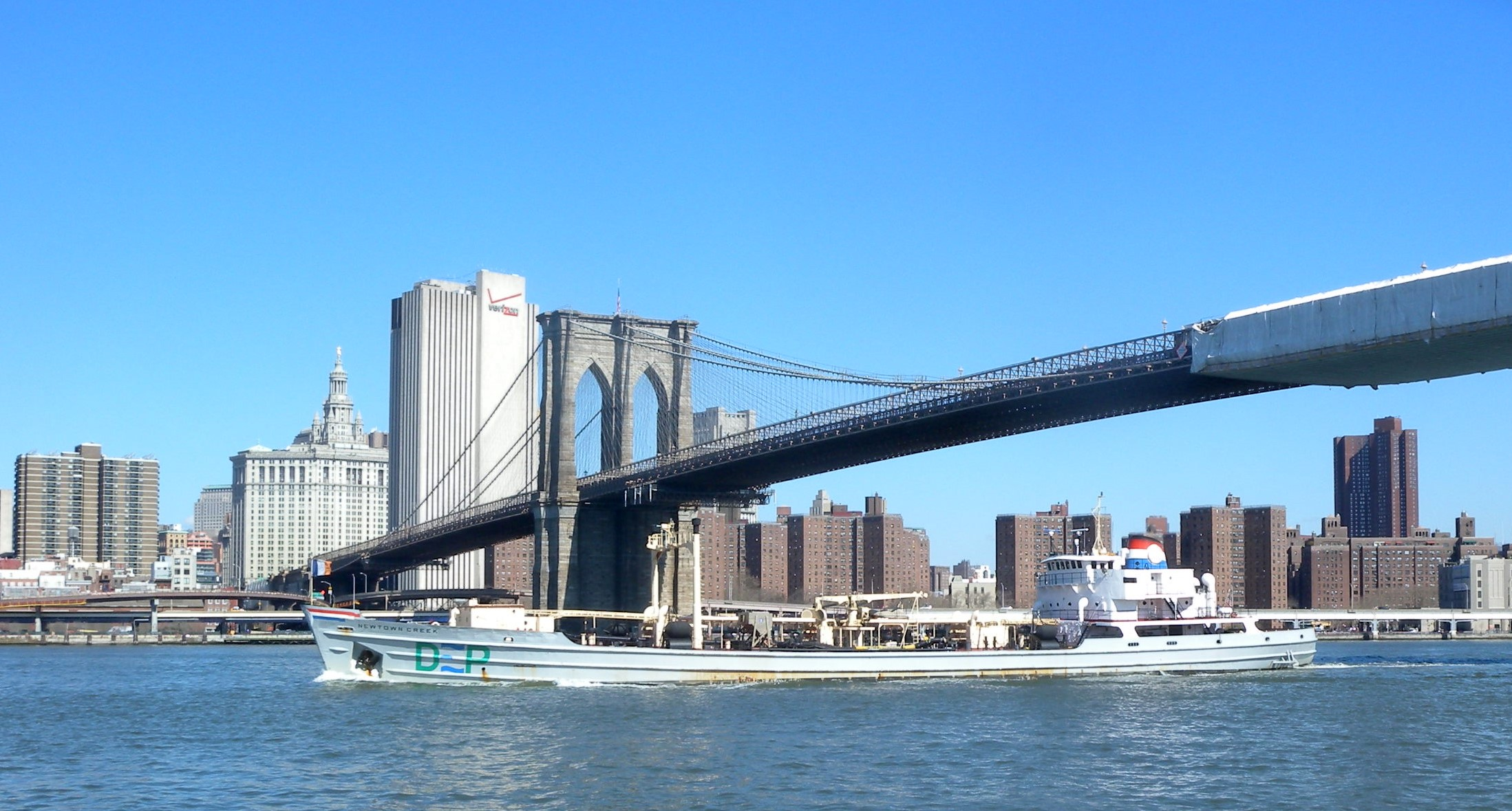
Sludge boat passing under the Brooklyn Bridge on the East River

The New York City Department of Environmental Protection (DEP) is the department of the government of New York City that manages the city's water supply and sewage treatment systems, and works to reduce air, noise, and hazardous materials pollution.

Under a $1.88 billion dollar budget, it provides more than 1.1 billion US gallons (4,200,000 m^{3}) of water each day to more than 9 million residents (including 8 million in the City of New York) through a complex network of nineteen reservoirs, three controlled lakes and 6,000 miles (9,700 km) of water mains, tunnels and aqueducts. DEP is also responsible for managing the city's combined sewer system, which carries both storm water runoff and sanitary waste, and fourteen sewage treatment plants located throughout the city. DEP carries out federal Clean Water Act rules and regulations, handles hazardous materials emergencies and toxic site remediation, oversees asbestos monitoring and removal, enforces the city's air and noise codes, bills and collects on city water and sewer accounts, and manages citywide water conservation programs. Its regulations are compiled in title 15 of the New York City Rules.

== Facilities ==
=== Drinking water ===
NYCDEP manages three upstate supply systems to provide the city's drinking water: the Croton system, the Catskill system, and the Delaware system. The overall distribution system has a storage capacity of 550 billion US gallons (2.1×10^{9} m^{3}) and provides over 1 billion US gallons (3,800,000 m^{3}) per day of water to more than eight million city residents and another one million users in four upstate counties bordering on the water supply system. The distribution system is made up of an extensive grid of water mains stretching approximately 6,600 miles (10,600 km).

=== Wastewater treatment ===
The city's wastewater is collected through an extensive grid of sewer pipes of various sizes and stretching over 7,400 miles (11,900 km). The Bureau of Wastewater Treatment (BWT) operates 14 water pollution control plants treating an average of 1.3 billion US gallons (4,900,000 m^{3}) of wastewater a day; 96 wastewater pump stations: 8 dewatering facilities; and 490 sewer regulators. The bureau has a staff of 1,900 employees, with a $340 million annual operating budget, and an annual capital budget of $200 million.

Wastewater Treatment Plants
Plant	Service area	Size ser day		Discharges to
Plant	Service area	In millions of gallons	In thousands of cubic meters	Discharges to
26th Ward	Eastern Brooklyn	85	320	Jamaica Bay
Bowery Bay	Northeast Queens	150	570	Upper East River
Coney Island	South Brooklyn, Central Brooklyn	110	420	Jamaica Bay
Hunts Point	Eastern Bronx	200	760	Upper East River
Jamaica	Southern Queens	100	380	Jamaica Bay
Newtown Creek	Manhattan, Brooklyn, Queens	310	1,200	East River
North River	Manhattan	170	640	Hudson River
Oakwood Beach	Staten Island	40	151	Lower New York Bay
Rockaway	Queens	45	170	Jamaica Bay
Owls Head	Brooklyn	120	450	Upper New York Bay
Wards Island	Bronx, Manhattan	275	1,040	Upper East River
Tallman Island	Queens	80	300	Upper East River
Port Richmond	Staten Island	60	230	Kill Van Kull
Red Hook	Brooklyn, Governor's Island	60	230	Lower East River

== Commissioners ==
The current commissioner Lisa Garcia was appointed by Mayor Zohran Mamdani in January 2026. Other former Commissioners include:

- Frank McArdle (1978–81), Ed Koch
- Joe McGough (1982–86), Ed Koch
- Harvey Schultz (1986–89), Ed Koch
- Albert Appleton (1990–93), David Dinkins
- Marilyn Gelber (1994–96), Rudy Giuliani
- Joel Miele (1996-2002), Rudy Giuliani
- Christopher O. Ward (2002–05), Michael Bloomberg
- Emily Lloyd (2005-08), Michael Bloomberg
- Caswell F. Holloway (2009-2011), Michael Bloomberg
- Carter H. Strickland, Jr. (2011-2014), Michael Bloomberg
- Emily Lloyd (2014–2016), Bill De Blasio
- Vincent Sapienza (2017–2022), Bill De Blasio
- Rohit Aggarwala (2022–2026), Eric Adams
- Lisa Garcia (2026-present}, Zohran Mamdani

== Watershed security ==
The New York City Department of Environmental Protection Police, also known as DEP Police, and formerly known as the Bureau of Water Supply Police and the Aqueduct Police, is the law enforcement arm of the DEP whose duties are to protect and preserve the New York City water supply system maintained by the New York City Department of Environmental Protection, the nation's largest single source water supply. The department has protected and preserved the water supply system for over 100 years. The department maintains jurisdiction in 14 counties of New York State including the 5 counties in New York City.

Training takes place in Kingston, NY for 6 months and 1-month at the precinct assigned to the trainee. Recruits are expected to move to Kingston, NY for the duration of the academy. Class sizes vary between 20 and 40 recruits and there is a new academy class every few years. The last academy graduated 4 new officers.

=== History ===
==== As BWS Police ====
The Bureau of Water Supply (BWS) Police was created through legislation enacted in the 1906 Water Supply Act. It was not until 1907 that the first provisional appointees were hired and assigned. On July 9, 1908, the first permanent police officers were appointed and assigned to the precincts in Peekskill, Garrison, Browns Station, and High Falls. The Bureau of Water Supply Police was the first police agency in upstate New York with a multiple county police jurisdiction.

In 1908, Rhinelander Waldo was appointed as Chief of the Board of the Aqueduct Police. At this time, there were approximately 60 men assigned to the force. After a few months of service, Rhinelander was appointed Fire Commissioner of the City of New York. He was succeeded by Captain Douglas I. McKay.

Captain McKay selected a number of qualified individuals from the civil service list with the intention of making them Aqueduct Police Sergeants. He created stringent requirements, including that all members must be qualified horseman, and have experience as an officer or non-commissioned officer in the United States Army or the National Guard (with a preference for Spanish–American War Veterans). Approximately two hundred men passed these rigid qualifications and were appointed as sergeants.

At this time, the newly formed Aqueduct Police, a force of 350 officers (300 of these being mounted units) were tasked with ensuring order in the unruly construction site work camps. The first Board of Water Supply Police Precinct was built in Spout Brook, approximately two miles from Peekskill, New York. Other Precincts were built shortly after, each being staffed by five sergeants and thirty officers and horses. During World War One, American involvement in the war brought the historic DEP Police to duties protecting the NYC water supply. As of the present day, the DEP Police today still has the same mission guarding the water supply, and is a participant of the annual First Provisional Regiment memorial services, held at the Village of Sleepy Hollow, NY. This Aqueduct Defense Memorial Service honors and remembers 40 soldiers who died while serving New York State during World War I. DEP Police provides an honor guard, cooperates with the NY state defense force, and local government officials to remember those perished while on aqueduct duties.

==== As DEP Police ====
In 1983, the Bureau of Water Supply became the Department of Environmental Protection and the New York State Legislature revised the Criminal Procedure Law, part of the New York State Laws, to include DEP police officers. In 1999, the DEP jurisdiction was extended to include the five boroughs of New York City.

In 2004, the highest court in the state, the New York State Court of Appeals, affirmed the DEP Police Department's jurisdiction throughout the watershed. Members of the DEP Police are New York State sworn police officers (not NYS peace officers, which many other NYC law enforcement agencies are).

== Violation of federal environmental laws ==
=== Pollution of the Hudson River ===
In 1976 the city was sued by the state and federal government for violating the Clean Water Act, due to the city's discharges of raw sewage to the Hudson River. The city had begun construction of the North River Wastewater Treatment Plant in 1972, but the project had fallen behind schedule. The city agreed to a consent decree and the partially-completed plant ("advanced preliminary treatment") began operation in 1986. The plant was upgraded to secondary treatment, in compliance with federal standards, in April 1991.

=== Toxic substances violations ===
The federal government began investigating the DEP in 1998 for possible violations in its handling of toxic materials. On August 29, 2001, the DEP pleaded guilty in federal court to criminal violations of the Clean Water Act and the Toxic Substances Control Act, and sentenced to probation. As a condition of probation, the DEP was required to implement an environmental, health and safety compliance program to prevent future environmental law violations and to improve employee safety working conditions. The US Justice Department acknowledged that the city's violations had not impaired drinking water quality.

In 2003, the Office of Environmental, Health and Safety Compliance (EHS) was formed to administer the DEP's comprehensive safety and compliance efforts, which included the EHS Employee Concerns Program.

In 2006, the term of probation was extended and the BWT was included under the federal monitor's oversight following a discharge of untreated sewage into the East River after emergency generators failed to operate during the August 2003 blackout. On December 25, 2009, probation and federal oversight of the DEP ended.

=== EHS Programs ===
==== Employee Concerns Program ====
Facilitates DEP employee reporting of observed environmental violations and unsafe employee conditions. Helps employees identify and prevent the harassment and intimidation of co-workers engaged in such activities. - 24/7 confidential employee concerns hotline - contract management plan to quicken execution of safety-related contracts - risk management program

==== Tiered Audit Program ====
Rates conditions by priority, enabling the agency to identify and address more than 44,000 specific workplace conditions

==== Compliance Action Plan ====
Ensures DEP follows all federal, state and local environmental, health and safety regulations by developing written policies, conducting training, and by purchasing and distributing safety equipment.

Since 2001, DEP has invested about $160 million in environmental health and safety programs.

== OpX Program ==
In 2011, the New York City Water Board appointed Veolia Water to partner with DEP in an effort to identify opportunities to make improvements in every aspect of New York City's drinking water, sewage collection, and wastewater treatment operations. Veolia teamed with McKinsey & Company and Arcadis to acquire additional analytical and technical expertise, respectively. The initiative, branded "Operational Excellence (OpX): The Best Always Do Better," is an opportunity for DEP to take employee ideas and best practices from water utilities across the globe to achieve the agency's goal of being the "safest, most productive, cost-effective, and transparent water utility in the nation."

Rather than responding to future financial pressures with budget cuts that might weaken critical services, the OpX initiative makes improvements that will increase the strength of DEP. The OpX program aims to streamline workflows, boost efficiency, and continuously identify opportunities for improvements that will allow DEP to maintain its level of customer service, safety, and productivity while minimizing rate increases for its roughly 836,000 rate-payers. To achieve this, the Commissioner set a goal for OpX to achieve operating benefits of $100–200 million by 2016.

== See also ==
- Environmental issues in New York City
- New York City Office of Administrative Trials and Hearings (OATH), for hearings conducted on summonses for quality of life violations issued by the Department
