= People v. Clayton =

Supreme Court of New York decision

People v. Clayton, 41 A.D.2d 204, 208 (N.Y. App. Div. 2d Dep't 1973) was a case before the Supreme Court of New York, Appellate Division. It determined that a trial court, when considering a "motion to dismiss in the interest of justice" (subsequently known as a "Clayton motion"), must convene an evidentiary hearing to consider whether the dismissal would in fact be in the "interest of justice".

== Background ==
=== Interrogation, confession, and conviction ===
On November 3, 1952, at 3 pm, Robert Clayton, an illiterate African American employed as a potato picker on a Long Island farm, was taken into police custody along with approximately ten others in connection with a murder which took place on the farm the previous day. The suspects were placed in a small, uncomfortable room. Each was privately questioned intermittently throughout the night. On November 4, at five o'clock in the morning, a stenographer transcribed a forty-five-minute session of questioning of Clayton. Late that afternoon, Clayton was confronted with a co-worker who had himself confessed falsely to the murder and who now claimed that Clayton had killed the victim and had moved the body with his help. Clayton continued to maintain his innocence.

At 9 pm, Clayton and Mickens were arraigned as "material witnesses" before a judge, and Clayton was held in lieu of bail in a small lock-up with a wooden plank as a mattress. During the next day, November 5, he was repeatedly questioned, until he confessed to the killing at 10:45 pm The police then brought him to the farm, where he pointed out items involved in the homicide. Back at the station house at about 3 am, Clayton amended and signed his confession. The stenographer later testified that, as Clayton did so, "there was a sense of fatigue" and "a stumbling over words" in his speech. He was then permitted to send a telegram to his mother which stated that "I have killed a man."

The county court found Clayton's confession to be voluntary, and sentenced him to thirty years to life on February 25, 1953. Both the appellate division and Court of Appeals affirmed.

=== Conviction reversed – confession found not voluntary ===
Clayton had not appealed the original judgment and only moved for coram nobis relief in 1965. Following the rule laid down in People v. Huntley (15 N Y 2d 72), the County Court held a hearing in 1965 to determine whether the defendant's confessions were voluntary; it determined that they were. This was affirmed by a divided vote in the New York Supreme Court, Appellate Division (a dissenter holding that the defendant's will was overborne by police pressure while in detention for an inordinate length of time).

Clayton instituted a federal habeas corpus proceeding. At the conclusion of an evidentiary hearing in 1971, the District Court found that the confessions were not voluntary—that the defendant had been subjected to a sham arraignment and had been constantly questioned for over 60 hours without adequate food or rest. The Court of Appeals implemented the order of the District Court requiring the defendant's release from custody unless he were retried within 30 days. The defendant in March 1972 was released on his own recognizance by that court.

=== Dismissal of indictment under 210.40 ===
On June 30, 1972, Clayton moved in the County Court for a dismissal of the indictment on the ground that he had not been brought to trial as required by the mandate of the United States Court of Appeals. On July 12, 1972, the county court dismissed the indictment against Clayton—not on the grounds of his request, but on its own motion, sua sponte and without a hearing, exercising its authority under 210.40. The reasons supporting the dismissal were the length of Clayton's imprisonment (nineteen years) in relation to the sentence he could serve if retried (twenty years to life imprisonment), and the court's conclusion that "court time could be better used for other purposes; that the defendant is presently free and working; and that the prosecutor had once offered to accept a plea to manslaughter [in the first degree], punishable by a maximum imprisonment of [twenty] years."

The district attorney appealed this order.

== Opinion of the court ==
The court reversed and remanded for a hearing.

=== Interpretation of CPL 210.40 and 210.45 ===
First, the Court found that the provisions of CPL 210.40 and 210.45 require that when a court considers a dismissal sua sponte, the parties should present evidence and arguments as may be pertinent to the "interests of justice", for which considerations include:

(a) the nature of the crime;
(b) the available evidence of guilt;
(c) the prior record of defendant;
(d) the punishment already suffered by defendant, in this case 19 years;
(e) the purpose and effect of further punishment;
(f) any prejudice resulting to defendant by the passage of time, and
(g) the impact on the public interest of a dismissal of the indictment.

The appellate division acknowledged the subjective nature of the calculus involved, which appealed to "factors largely resting on value judgments of the court," but emphasized that those judgments must necessarily rest on facts in the possession of the parties; such factors should also be set out in the record to facilitate review. The Second Department believed that this hearing requirement pitched the appropriate balance:

The sensitive balance between the individual and the State that must be maintained in applying the test of the interests of justice which CPL 210.40 contemplates moves in response to factors largely resting on value judgments of the court. But those judgments in turn hinge on the production of facts in the possession of the prosecution and the defendant. Moreover, the discretion of the court cannot be properly reviewed unless the record discloses the facts upon which the court's judgment was based. On the one side the statute allows an escape from the rigorous rules controlling the dismissal of an indictment only for reasons arising from substantial defects in supporting evidence or required procedure; on the other side, the statute erects the well-considered discretion of the court as a safeguard to prevent a dismissal of the indictment unless the public interests are as fully protected as the individual interests of the defendant for justice and mercy.
It may well be that the County Court will again conclude that the indictment should be dismissed in the furtherance of justice after giving deliberation to what the parties may offer on the remand. Certainly, we do not say that the court cannot reach such a conclusion; and, indeed, the defendant's interests and the public interests may coincide to compel that conclusion. All that we now hold is that full opportunity should be afforded to the People and the defendant to provide the court with such evidence and arguments that they deem relevant to the issue.

=== Discussion of the facts ===
In this case, the defendant's motion to dismiss had not prayed for relief "in furtherance of justice", but rather on the ground that the mandate of the United States Court of Appeals had not been followed by the People. Hence, no adequate notice of that claim was given to the prosecution. Although extended colloquy between counsel and the court occurred on the argument of the motion, some of which related to the location and existence of witnesses, the question whether the defendant should stand trial in the interests of justice was not directly the subject of the defendant's motion.

The County Court in dismissing the indictment found that the defendant had already served 19 years in prison; that he could be retried only for murder in the second degree, which carries a penalty of an indeterminate sentence having a minimum of 20 years and a maximum of life (former New York Penal Law, § 1048); that court time could be better used for other purposes; that the defendant is presently free and working; and that the prosecutor had once offered to accept a plea to manslaughter [in the first degree], punishable by a maximum imprisonment of 20 years (former New York Penal Law, § 1051). All of these considerations plainly flow from events taking place after the homicide for which the defendant was indicted, and, of course, these considerations might be modified or amplified by other events relevant to the interests of justice.
