= New York City Tax Appeals Tribunal =

New York City government agency

Tax Appeals Tribunal
Court overview
- Jurisdiction: New York City
- Key document: New York City Charter
- Website: www.nyc.gov/taxtribunal

The New York City Tax Appeals Tribunal is an administrative court of the New York City government that conducts trials and hears appeals regarding city-administered taxes (other than real estate taxes). It is a non-mayoral executive agency and is not part of the state Unified Court System.

== History ==
The tribunal was created by vote in 1988. The legislature implanted the tribunal in further legislation in 1992.

== See also ==
- New York City Office of Administrative Trials and Hearings
- New York City Tax Commission
