= Rohit Aggarwala =

American environmentalist (born 1971)

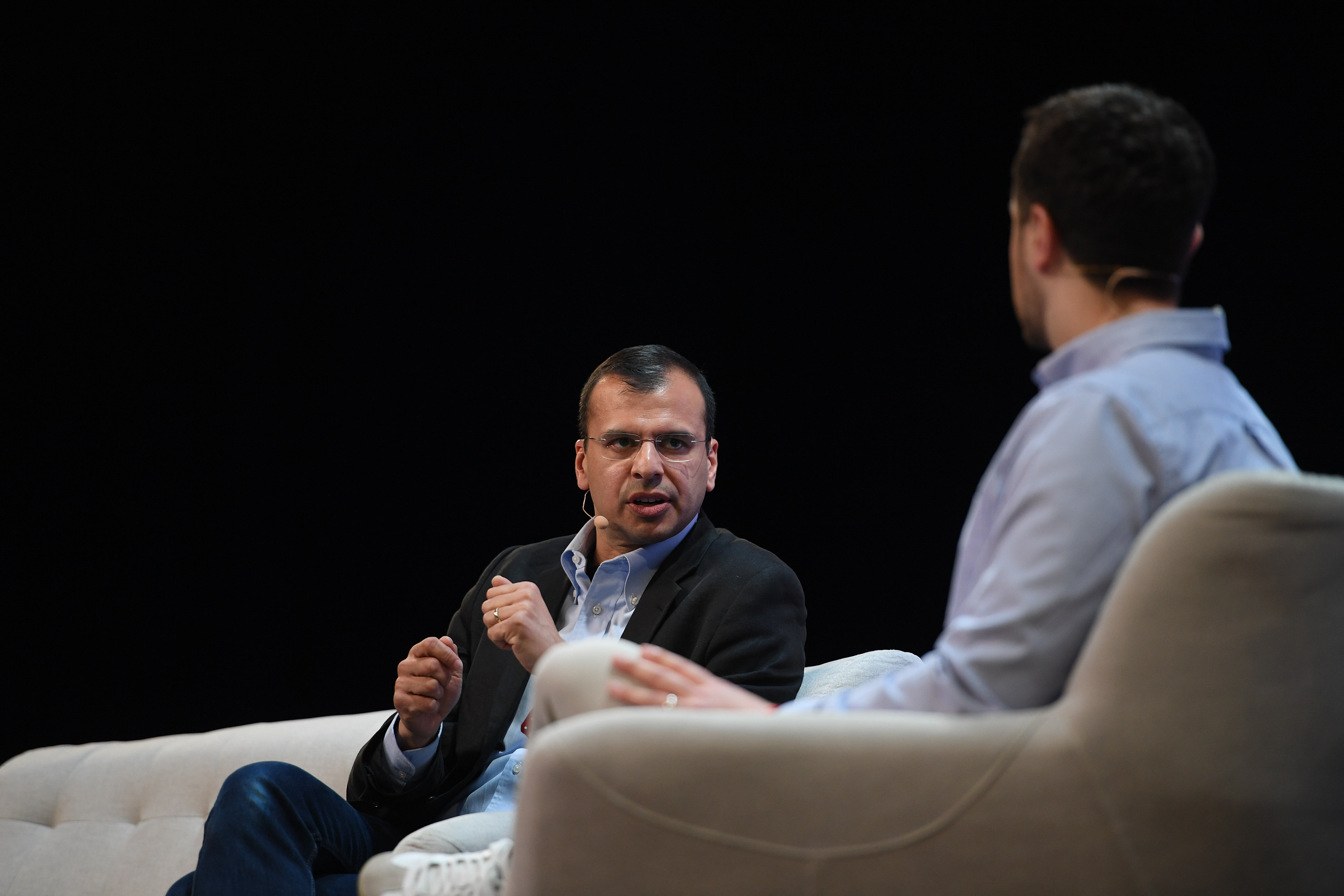
- Aggarwala (2019)

Commissioner of the New York City Department of Environmental Protection
- In office January 31, 2022 – January 2026
- Mayor: Eric Adams
- Preceded by: Vincent Sapienza
- Succeeded by: Lisa Garcia

Personal details
- Born: Rohit T. Aggarwala; June 18, 1971 (age 55) New York City, NY, U.S.
- Education: Columbia University (BA, MBA, PhD); Queen’s University (MA)

Rohit T. "Rit" Aggarwala is an Indian-American environmental policy adviser, transportation planner, historian, and civil servant who was New York City’s Chief Climate Officer, and the Commissioner of the New York City Department of Environmental Protection under the Eric Adams Administration.

== Biography ==
Aggarwala grew up in White Plains, New York. He received his B.A. in history from Columbia University in 1993, before going on to earn his MPhil, Ph.D. in history as well as an M.B.A., all from Columbia over a span of ten years. He also earned a MA in Canadian history from Queen's University at Kingston. At Columbia, he was a reporter for Columbia Daily Spectator and president of the College Democrats. His advisors included Richard Bushman, Kenneth T. Jackson, and Elizabeth Blackmar.

Aggarwala began his career in Federal Railroad Administration and worked for McKinsey & Company, New York State Assembly, Virginia Railway Express, prior to joining public service.

Aggarwala was tapped by New York City Mayor Michael Bloomberg to create the Office of Long-Term Planning and Sustainability and served as director of the office from 2006 to 2010. He also helped author the PlaNYC blueprint, a sustainability plan for the city.

From 2010 to 2015, he worked at Bloomberg Philanthropies, heading its sustainability practice division. He served as Chair, Committee on the Fourth Regional Plan, for the Regional Plan Association from the inception of the process in 2014 until the publication of the Fourth Plan in 2017. He was president of the board of directors of the C40 Cities Climate Leadership Group and was a member of the founding team of Sidewalk Labs, where he served as chief policy officer, head of urban systems, and remained a senior advisor. For his role at Sidewalk Labs, he was named one of the "Politico 50" by the eponymous magazine in 2018. He led a high-profile smart city-building project in Waterfront Toronto before it was cancelled in May 2020 due to stakeholders' disagreements, privacy concerns, and the COVID-19 pandemic, which also led to his exit from the company.

In 2020, he was named Senior Urban Tech Fellow at Cornell Tech. He is the lead author of the Rebooting NYC report, published by Cornell Tech in 2022, which proposes urban tech solutions to New York City's biggest challenges. He is also an adjunct associate professor at the School of International and Public Affairs, Columbia University, where he teaches urban policy.

In January 2022, he was tapped by Mayor Eric Adams to serve as chief climate officer and commissioner of the New York City Department of Environmental Protection.

== See also ==
- Indian Americans in New York City
