= Briana's Law =

New York State law requiring CPR training for police

New York State Legislature
- Long title: New York Senate Bill S3165B
- Territorial extent: New York (state)
- Passed by: New York State Legislature
- Passed: January 20, 2017
- Signed by: Andrew Cuomo
- Signed: August 27, 2017
- Introduced by: Felix Ortiz
- Status: Current legislation

Briana's Law is the name given to New York Senate Bill S3165B signed by Governor Andrew Mark Cuomo during the 2017–2018 Legislative Session which honors the memory of Briana Ojeda. Briana Ojeda was an 11-year-old girl from Brooklyn, New York, who died in the summer of 2010 when police officer Alfonso Mendez did not perform CPR on her after she suffered from an asthma attack. Prior to the passage of the law, the New York Police Department trained its officers in CPR, but they were not obligated by law to perform it. Briana's Law requires that every police officer, member of the State Police, including police officer trainees and state police cadets, receive CPR training prior to employment as well as during employment every two years, where practicable, but no later than 4 years, and requires that individuals demonstrate proficiency in the technique.

== Briana Ojeda ==
Briana Amaryllis Ojeda was a young girl of Puerto Rican descent born in 1998 in Brooklyn, New York, to Michael Angelo and Carmen Ojeda. Ojeda was raised there and received her primary education in the Boerum Hill Historic District section of that borough. She was about to enter the sixth grade at St. Francis Xavier School when on August 27, 2010, she suffered an asthma attack while playing in a Carroll Gardens playground. Her mother, Carmen, panicked when she realized that the asthma attack was severe. She rushed to take her daughter to the Long Island College Hospital which was the closest hospital to them in Brooklyn. While driving her car, she mistakenly made a wrong turn on a one way street .

Officer Alfonso Mendez, a five-year veteran in the New York Police Department, spotted Carmen Ojeda's car going in the wrong direction. He told her to pull over and to stop her car. Carmen Ojeda did as she was told and told the police officer that her daughter was not breathing and needed CPR immediately.

According to the testimony of witness Eria Domenech:

So he's just standing there. My mother goes 'Do you know CPR? Do you know CPR?' At this point everybody's frustrated and he, with a little smirk on his face, says 'No. I don't know CPR',

The New York Police Department does train its officers in CPR, but they were not obligated by law to perform it. Mendez later testified in a deposition that the only training in CPR that he received was that out of a textbook and that he had never practiced it on anyone.

Mendez proceeded to give Carmen Ojeda a ticket which delayed her from continuing on to the hospital. Finally, he allowed Carmen Ojeda to continue driving to the Long Island College Hospital; however, instead of calling 9-1-1 for help and leading Carmen Ojedas' car to the hospital with his squad-car, thereby allowing her to pass through the heavy traffic, he followed her with his car. When they finally arrived at the hospital emergency room, it was too late. Ojeda was pronounced dead about an hour later.

Briana Ojeda's funeral was held at St. Francis Xavier Church, the Park Slope church. Her casket was carried along 6th Avenue and placed on a horse-drawn carriage. The carriage then took the casket to the cemetery where she was buried. The event was covered by the news media, including CBS 2's Pablo Guzman. Briana was survived by her parents Michael Angelo and Carmen Ojeda, her brother Michael Angelo Jr. and by her grandmother Maria.

== Search for Officer Mendez ==
According to the New York Daily News, Police Commissioner Raymond "Ray" Kelly told reporters at a press briefing that not enough information is known to determine whether the person being blamed in the death of Briana Ojeda was in fact an NYPD officer. Kelly also said that the NYPD's Internal Affairs Bureau was expanding its search to neighboring commands. He speculated the mystery officer could have been a police officer from outside of the 76th Precinct visiting a courthouse in nearby downtown Brooklyn. The commissioner said it's also possible the officer could have been an NYPD traffic agent, auxiliary cop or even someone from a different law enforcement agency or a private security company.

Mendez, who was assigned to the 84th Precinct in downtown Brooklyn, failed to turn himself in. The NYPD's Internal Affairs at the time spent several days trying to identify the officer who allegedly failed to help Carmen Ojeda. Police Commissioner Ray Kelly was upset because it took four days to locate Mendez. After Mendez turned himself in, he was suspended without pay for thirty days by the NYPD. The reason behind the suspension was that he failed to report his involvement in the incident. However, no criminal charges were filed against him.

== Lawsuit ==
In November, the Ojeda family hired attorney Bonita Zelman and sued the city and Mendez. The family was demanding $10 million to compensate for the loss of their daughter. In addition they also sued the city and Mendez for $7 million for their alleged negligence. According to attorney Zelman, "The city failed to properly train and supervise Mendez".

An investigation by the NYPD reported that Mendez had confronted Carmen Ojeda, after she allegedly had sideswiped a car near Kane and Henry streets while driving the wrong way down a one-way street in a mad dash to get her choking daughter to Long Island College Hospital on Hicks Street. After the mother told Mendez about the situation with her daughter, he claimed that he didn't know CPR – even though all NYPD officers are trained in the life-saving technique at the Police Academy. Then Mendez proceeded to give Carmen Ojeda a ticket for the car accident as her daughter gasped for air.

== Supreme Court dismisses the lawsuit ==
In July 2016, the case regarding the lawsuit was presented before Kings County Supreme Court Justice Dawn M. Jimenez-Salta, a Brooklyn judge.

According to the New York Daily News, Mendez had testified in a deposition that he had only received CPR training out of a textbook and had never practiced on a dummy. "I didn't feel safe putting my hands on someone without actually knowing what I'm doing," Mendez testified.

Neither Carmen Ojeda nor the witnesses of the incident were asked to testify. After hearing the arguments from the accused, the judge dismissed the lawsuit in favor of the city and Mendez. According to Judge Jimenez-Salta, her decision in regard to Mendez was based on the fact that the NYPD does not require officers "to know and be willing and able" to perform the life-saving resuscitation. An exception would be if the person in need of aid is under arrest.

The judge also dismissed the claim of intentional infliction of emotional distress because she did not find Mendez's failure to perform CPR "extreme and outrageous" due to his lack of knowledge.

Lawyers for the city moved to dismiss the wrongful death suit, arguing that there is no constitutional or state right to the government providing emergency medical assistance. Therefore, the judge decided that the brief traffic stop "did not trigger a constitutional duty to provide medical assistance."

Carmen Ojeda later said that she had felt a sense of relief when she first encountered Mendez, believing that he would help her by applying CPR to her daughter. She also stated that police officers should be made to help a person because they are the first ones on the scene.

== New York Senate Bill S3165B (Briana's Law) ==
The Ojedas were frustrated with the judge's decision and hired a new lawyer, Jason Leventhal, to review the decision. However, the decision prevailed, and the Ojedas then took it upon themselves to promote the establishment of a law which would require every NYPD officer to get CPR training.

External audio
- Cuomo Signs 'Briana's Law,' Requiring CPR Training For NYPD Officers, State Troopers Video on YouTube

Every year the Ojeda family would travel to Albany, New York, and fight for a mandatory CPR law before the New York State Senate. In 2013, New York Assemblyman Felix Ortiz introduced a bill called "Briana's Law". It passed the Assembly but did not get voted on in the Senate. New York State Senators Velmanette Montgomery, who is steering the bill through the Senate and Jesse Hamilton introduced the bill known as Bill S3165B to the State Senate and on January 20, 2017, it was passed by the Senate legislature with the sponsorship and the backing of Assembly Assistant Speaker Felix W. Ortiz, Councilman Stephen Levin and the American Red Cross Metro N.Y. North and American Heart Association of New York City.

On August 27, 2017, New York Governor Andrew Cuomo signed "Briana's Law" requiring all police officers to get CPR training and be re-certified every 2 years. The following is a copy of the law signed by the governor:

S T A T E O F N E W Y O R K
3165--B
2017-2018 Regular Sessions
I N S E N A T E
January 20, 2017
Introduced by Sen. HAMILTON -- read twice and ordered printed, and when printed to be committed to the Committee on Local Government committee -- discharged, bill amended, ordered reprinted as amended and recommitted to said committee -- reported favorably from said committee and committed to the Committee on Finance -- committee discharged, bill amended, ordered reprinted as amended and recommitted to said committee
AN ACT to amend the executive law and the general municipal law, in relation to requiring certain police officers to be re-trained in cardiopulmonary resuscitation every two years
THE PEOPLE OF THE STATE OF NEW YORK, REPRESENTED IN SENATE AND ASSEMBLY, DO ENACT AS FOLLOWS:
Section 1. Short title. This act shall be known and may be cited as "Briana's law".
S 2. The executive law is amended by adding a new section 214-e to read as follows:
S 214-E. CARDIOPULMONARY RESUSCITATION TRAINING AND RETRAINING.
1. FOR THE PURPOSES OF THIS SECTION, "CARDIOPULMONARY RESUSCITATION" SHALL HAVE THE SAME MEANING AS PROVIDED IN SUBDIVISION SIX OF SECTION SIX HUNDRED TWENTY-ONE OF THE GENERAL BUSINESS LAW.
2. EACH MEMBER OF THE DIVISION OF STATE POLICE SHALL BE:
(A) TRAINED IN CARDIOPULMONARY RESUSCITATION DURING THE TRAINING PROCESS TO BECOME A TROOPER;
(B) RETRAINED IN CARDIOPULMONARY RESUSCITATION EVERY TWO YEARS; AND
(C) REQUIRED TO DEMONSTRATE THE SATISFACTORY COMPLETION OF TRAINING IN CARDIOPULMONARY RESUSCITATION.
S 3. The general municipal law is amended by adding a new section 208-h to read as follows:
S 208-H. CARDIOPULMONARY RESUSCITATION TRAINING AND RETRAINING FOR POLICE DEPARTMENTS IN CITIES HAVING A POPULATION OF ONE MILLION OR MORE
1. FOR THE PURPOSES OF THIS SECTION, "CARDIOPULMONARY RESUSCITATION"

EXPLANATION--Matter in ITALICS (underscored) is new; matter in brackets

[ ] is old law to be omitted.

LBD06814-08-7

New York State Senator Jesse Hamilton made the following statement after the Governor signed the Bill converting it into Briana's Law:

Vindicating a 7-year effort to make communities across NY safer.

Briana Ojeda and her family have given the gift of life to New Yorkers who turn to help from police. Briana's Law ensures our police officers have the training to provide life-saving assistance in an emergency.

Thanks to my colleagues for seeing the wisdom of this measure, thanks to Assistant Speaker Felix W. Ortiz for his leadership on this issue, and thanks to Carmen and Michael Ojeda, Briana's parents, whose strength, advocacy, and sense of purpose has seen this measure through to legislative passage.

Governor Andrew Cuomo's signing Briana's Law yesterday vindicates a seven-year effort to make communities across New York safer, with police who are more capable of delivering aid in emergencies. This is a legacy truly worthy of Briana Ojeda's memory.

== Tributes to Briana ==
The Ojeda family opened Angel's Gourmet Deli & Nuna's Juice Bar in Brooklyn in remembrance of their daughter, Briana Ojeda. The Ojeda family made a request to the Brooklyn Community Board 2 to rename Bergen Street between Hoyt and Bond streets in honor of their daughter. Brooklyn Community Board 2 voted in favor and sent the petition to the New York City Council for approval. The street was named "Briana Ojeda Way" in Brooklyn, NY 11217.

== See also ==
- Alcohol laws of New York
- Capital punishment in New York
- New York divorce law
- New York energy law
- Felony murder rule (New York)
- Gun laws in New York
- Necessity defense (New York)
- Molineux hearing
- Motion to dismiss in the interest of justice
- LGBT rights in New York
- Rent control in New York
