= Blanche Bernstein =

American politician (died 1993)

- Born: New York City, New York, U.S.
- Education: Hunter College; Columbia University
- Occupation: Welfare expert
- Known for: Commissioner of the New York City Department of Human Resources

Blanche Bernstein (died Jan. 27, 1993) was a welfare expert and controversial commissioner of the New York City Department of Human Resources (1978–1979) at the outset of the administration of Mayor Edward I. Koch. Bernstein was a critic of a system she thought created dependency rather than uplifting welfare recipients, a perspective that was strongly criticized by other experts and welfare advocates, but which prefigured both the Reagan Era attack on welfare and the later reforms under President Bill Clinton.

== Early life and education ==
Bernstein was born in New York City. She graduated from Hunter College and earned a master's and doctoral degrees at Columbia University. She was Jewish.

== Government and educational career ==
She was chief of program and planning for Europe in the Foreign Operations Administration from 1951 to 1953 and the research director for the Community Council of New York from 1953 to 1961.

From 1961 to 1968 she was chief of the U.S. State Department's office interacting with the United Nations on housing, health, children, welfare, urban affairs, development, education and job training.

From 1969 to 1975 she was The New School's research director on urban social problems and editor of the City Almanac.

For two years in the administration of Governor Hugh L. Carey, she was deputy commissioner for income maintenance in the New York State Deputy of Social Services, where she was in charge of public assistance, food stamps and welfare job programs.

In 1978, Bernstein was appointed commissioner of the New York City Department of Human Resources.

After leaving government in 1979, she became director of the Social Policy Research Institute at The New School for Social Research.

After retiring from The New School, she was a trustee of the City University of New York.

== Critique of welfare system ==
Bernstein concluded that the welfare system of her era encouraged the continued dependency of recipients instead of effecting their independence. "Reduction of dependency is the greatest unmet need in social policy today," she once said. "We have not gotten to the heart of the problem".

She blamed social workers themselves for maintaining what she believed was the failing status quo.

Other experts and welfare advocates accused her of being unsympathetic to poor people, which she denied. Upon her appointment by Koch, the weekly Village Voice criticized her for allegedly having a track record focused on "devising new strategies to cut the welfare budget". Indeed, as Koch took office amidst the continuing fiscal crisis of the city, Bernstein's task was to reduce the welfare rolls, a task that drew special criticism from Black political leaders, who accused her of being "anti-poor." But, at a tense meeting several months into the administration, Koch responded to Bernstein critics by saying "You shouldn't be pointing your finger at Blanche Bernstein; you should be talking about me because she's doing exactly what I'm telling her to do". Koch ultimately fired Bernstein because her brusque style had become too much of a liability.

In her later career, Bernstein came to focus increasingly on the growing and entwined problems of teenage mothers, single-parent families, poor education, school dropout, and unemployment. Unless society "breaks the cycle of dependency and poverty," she said, "we are in danger of creating a permanent underclass".
