= New York City Department of Homeless Services =

New York City government agency

Department of Homeless Services

Department overview
- Formed: 1993; 33 years ago
- Jurisdiction: New York City
- Headquarters: 33 Beaver Street, 17th Floor New York, NY 10004
- Employees: 1,627 (FY26)
- Annual budget: $3.88 billion (FY26)
- Department executive: Joslyn Carter, Administrator
- Parent department: New York City Human Resources Administration
- Child department: New York City Department of Homeless Services
- Key document: New York City Charter
- Website: www.nyc.gov/dhs

The New York City Department of Homeless Services (DHS) is an agency within the government of New York City that provides services to the homeless, though its ultimate aim is to eliminate homelessness. The guiding principles of the department were outlined by the New York City Commission on the Homeless in 1992: to operate an emergency shelter system for people without housing alternatives, provide services and resources to assist shelter residents in gaining independent housing, and partner with local agencies and non-profits to provide these services. Its two rules are compiled in title 31 of the New York City Rules; state regulations are primarily compiled in title 18 of the New York Codes, Rules and Regulations.

== History ==
Created in 1993, the department was the first of its kind nationally; with a mission exclusively focused on the issue of homelessness. The Department of Homeless Services was created in response to the growing number of homeless New Yorkers and the 1981 New York Supreme Court Consent Decree that mandates the State provide shelter to all homeless people. Its first commissioner was Charles V. Raymond. Muzzy Rosenblatt, the agency's first Chief of Staff, may have had a role in convincing Mayor David Dinkins that the homeless shelters could be run more efficiently were it a separate department from the New York City Human Resources Administration.

In 2010, the department oversaw 208 facilities with 18,616 beds and served 113,553 unique individuals. As of December 2015, there were a total of 65,458 clients in the shelter system. In 2015, the department's budget was $953.5 million.

In a March 2015 report of the New York City Department of Investigation (DOI) on shelters for families with children, the DOI "found that the family shelters it inspected and reviewed are too often unsafe and unhealthy for children and families". In 2014 and 2015, some New Yorkers without homes said they were denied shelter because the shelter lacks resources for couples without children, and some said they refused to live in shelters because they are unsafe, because of violence, theft and poor conditions.

On April 11, 2016, Mayor Bill de Blasio announced that the department would again become a part of the New York City Human Resources Administration under what he termed "a joint operating agreement".

Picture the Homeless heavily criticized DHS's use of resources in its 2018 report, The Business of Homelessness. The organization's recommendations included diverting funds for housing those who are homeless and most at risk of shelter entry, prioritizing capital subsidies for housing for people making as low as 10% of the area median income; semi-annual reports on shelter spending and provider performance; implementing rigorous and effective shelter inspection practices, and overhaul DHS's approach to rental assistance and housing placement. The use of funds for shelters instead of housing was also a concern when the agency was formed in 1993.

=== Administrators ===
- Joselyn Carter, 2017–2026
- Gilbert Taylor, 2014-2015

== Public safety ==
This agency employs Special Officers who provide on-site safety and security at 26 New York City DHS homeless facilities. These special officers have limited peace officer authority under New York State Criminal Procedure Law § 2.10(40) and DHS policies, DHS Special Officers are prohibited by state law from carrying a firearm.

The New York City Police Department is the primary policing and investigation agency within New York City as per the NYC Charter, They respond to all incidents that occur at NYC Department of Homeless Services Services facilities

=== Equipment ===
All officers are equipped with Tasers, expandable batons, handcuffs, flashlight, bullet resistant vest, pepper spray, body-worn cameras, Narcan, and a radio.

NYC DHS Police patch

NYC DHS Police Task Force patch

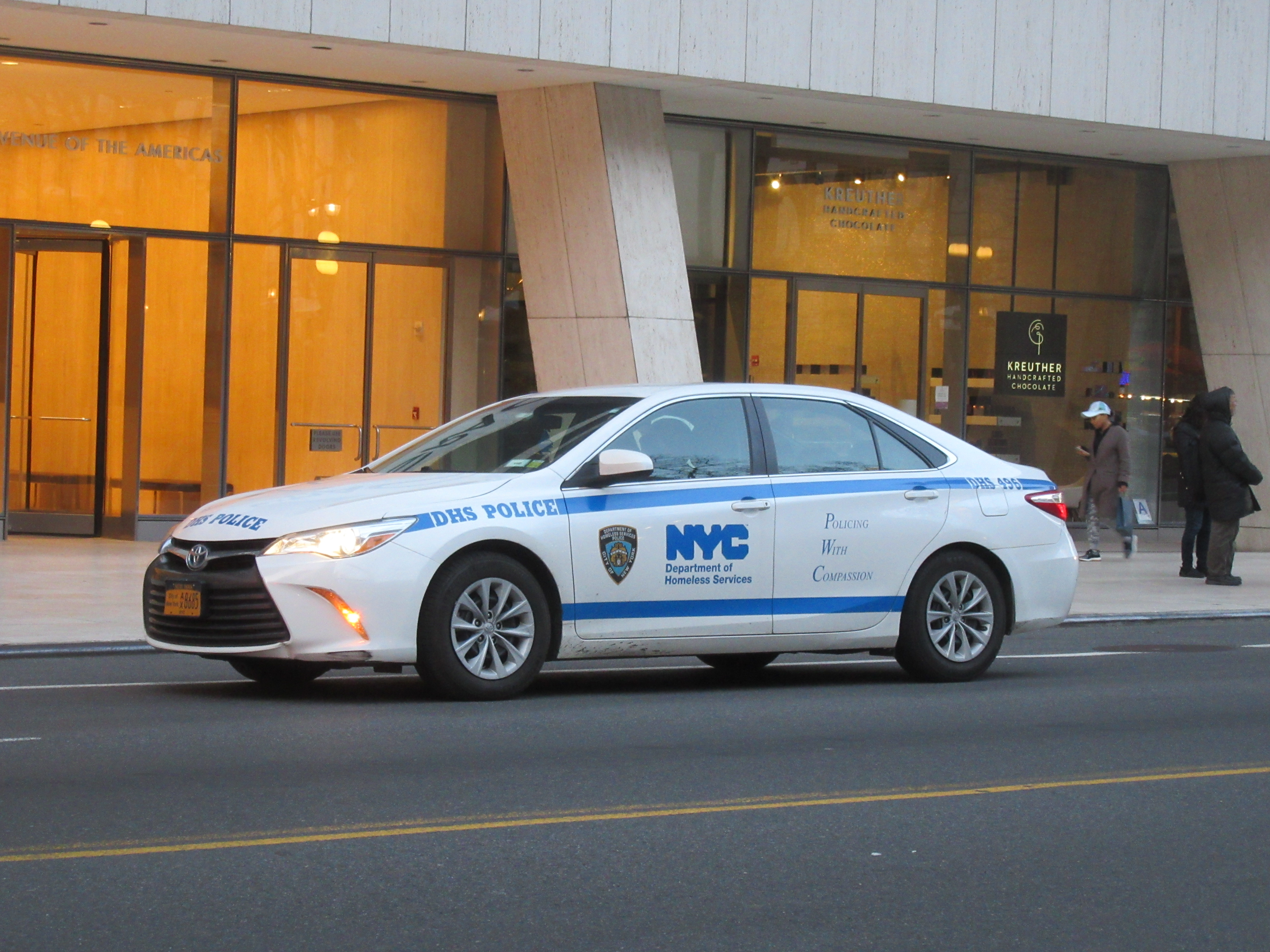
A NYC DHS Police Toyota Camry

== See also ==
- Homelessness in the United States
