= Motion to dismiss in the interest of justice =

The motion to dismiss in the interest of justice is a provision of the New York Criminal Procedure Law (CPL) § 210.40; since being interpreted in People v. Clayton, it has been known as a "Clayton motion".

== Background ==
CPL 210.40 is a successor to section 671 of the Code of Criminal Procedure, which in turn has been said to be merely a substitute for the ancient right of the Attorney-General to discontinue a prosecution. But section 671 allowed the court to dismiss an indictment "in furtherance of justice" either on motion of the District Attorney or on its own motion; moreover, the code removed the right of the prosecutor to abandon the indictment except in compliance with section 671. The early history of determinations under the statute evinces the inclination of the court to use its provisions sparingly; the statute was usually invoked to dismiss an indictment for the insufficiency of evidence before a grand jury after a defendant's motion to inspect the minutes had been granted. (The statute provided a method to afford relief to a defendant, who could not move to inspect the minutes of the grand jury without showing a reason to believe that the evidence before it was insufficient to support the indictment. Since the defendant could not know the nature of the proceedings before the grand jury, he was obviously at a disadvantage.)

More recently, the statute has been employed to reach cases in which the court found for a variety of reasons that the ends of justice would be served by the termination of the prosecution. Indeed, it has been stated that the use of the statute depended only on principles of justice, not on the legal or factual merits of the charge or even on the guilt or innocence of the defendant.

== Terms ==
N.Y. Crim. Proc. Law § 210.40 grants the defendant (or the prosecutor or the court) the power to apply for relief:

- First, it directs the court to find, under the general concept of the "furtherance of justice" stated in its provisions, that the "dismissal is required as a matter of judicial discretion by the existence of some compelling factor, consideration or circumstance clearly demonstrating that conviction or prosecution of the defendant upon such indictment or count would constitute or result in injustice."
- Second, it directs that the procedure for the application is to be governed by N.Y. Crim. Proc. Law § 210.20. § 210.20, providing for the omnibus motion against an indictment, must be read with N.Y. Crim. Proc. Law § 210.45(6), which commands the court to conduct a hearing on the motion.

=== People v. Clayton ===
The provisions of N.Y. Crim. Proc. Law §§ 210.40 and 210.45 require a hearing when either the prosecution or the defendant moves to dismiss the indictment in the furtherance of justice.

In People v. Clayton, the Court held that when a trial court considers sua sponte a dismissal for the same reason, it should not do so until fair notice of its intention has been given to the parties and a hearing has been held. At the hearing the parties may, if they are so advised, present such evidence and arguments as may be pertinent to the interests of justice. Among the considerations which are applicable to the issue are (a) the nature of the crime, (b) the available evidence of guilt, (c) the prior record of the defendant, (d) the punishment already suffered by the defendant, (e) the purpose and effect of further punishment, (f) any prejudice resulting to the defendant by the passage of time and (g) the impact on the public interest of a dismissal of the indictment.

== See also ==
- Law of New York
- Judiciary of New York
