= New York City Sheriff's Office =

New York City's civil law enforcement agency

Office of the Sheriff of the City of New York
- Patch of the New York City Sheriff's Office

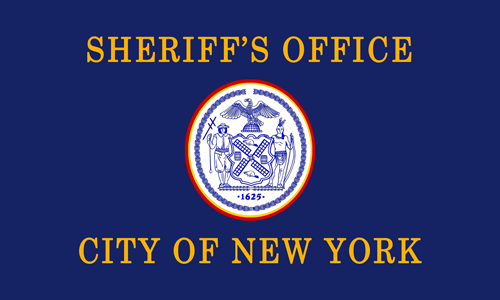
- Flag of the City of New York City Sheriff's Office
- Common name: New York City Sheriff's Office
- Motto: New York's First

Agency overview
- Formed: 1626

Jurisdictional structure
- Operations jurisdiction: New York, New York, U.S.
- Map of Office of the Sheriff of the City of New York's jurisdiction
- Area: 468.484 square miles (1,213.37 km^{2})
- Population: 8,537,673 (2017)
- Legal jurisdiction: New York City
- General nature: Civilian police

Operational structure
- Deputy sheriffs and investigators: 317 (authorized head count)
- Agency executive: Edwin Raymond, Sheriff of the City of New York
- Parent agency: New York City Department of Finance

Facilities
- County field offices: 5 List: New York County Field Office for Manhattan; Queens County Field Office for Queens (Headquarters); Bronx County Field Office for The Bronx; Kings County Field Office for Brooklyn; Richmond County Field Office for Staten Island

Website
- nyc.gov/sheriff

The Office of the Sheriff of the City of New York, also known as the New York City Sheriff's Office or New York County Sheriff's Office (NYCSO), is the primary civil law enforcement agency for New York City. The Sheriff's Office is a division of the New York City Department of Finance, operating as its enforcement arm. The Sheriff's Office handles investigations concerning cigarette tax enforcement, real estate property/deed fraud and other matters deemed necessary by the Department of Finance.

In addition, as the city's chief civil law enforcement agency concerning the New York State Court System, the Sheriff's Office enforces a variety of mandates, orders, warrants and decrees issued by courts. Enforcement tools include evictions, seizure of property, arrests and garnishments. Auctions are conducted for property the agency seizes and levies upon.

== History ==
The New York City Sheriff's Office originated in 1626 under the Dutch. Under later English rule, the position became known as the New York County Sheriff's Office. Originally each of the counties which became the boroughs of New York City had its own sheriff, which held the widest law enforcement mandate in their respective jurisdictions. Like most sheriffs in the United States, these office holders were elected to their positions.

Once the city was consolidated in 1898, the New York City Police Department took over the responsibility of policing and criminal investigations throughout the five boroughs of New York City, while the Sheriff's Office continued to focus on civil law enforcement and administering the county prison systems. Sheriffs were compensated by charging fees for enforcing civil orders in addition to keeping a monetary percentage (known as poundage) of what their office would seize.

By 1915, plans were made by the commissioner of accounts to alter the way sheriffs were compensated to include a determined salary instead of having the office holder personally retain fees and poundage. Although fees and poundage would still be charged by sheriffs, the monies would be retained for their respective county's use only. In 1938, the first female deputy sheriff was appointed.

On January 1, 1942, the city's five county sheriff's offices were merged to become the Office of the Sheriff of the City of New York. The five county sheriffs were abolished and replaced with borough "chief deputies" (later undersheriffs) reporting to the now mayorally-appointed citywide sheriff. A contemporary report of the changes emphasized professionalization of the office, which had become notorious for employing political patronage beneficiaries. The new top five commanders were "all college graduates" and "lawyers like their chief, who promises to keep out politics". At the same time, the sheriff's former responsibility for running prison systems was transferred to the newly established New York City Department of Correction.

== Rank structure ==
Title	Insignia	Badge design	Uniform shirt color
Sheriff		Medallion with eagle and five stars	White
First Deputy Sheriff		Medallion with eagle and four stars	Medallion with eagle and two stars
Chief of Citywide Operations		Medallion with eagle and three stars	White
Undersheriff	two stars	Medallion with eagle and two stars	
Lieutenant		Medallion with Rank	White
Sergeant		Shield with eagle	Dark blue
Deputy Sheriff		Shield	Dark blue

In order to be appointed as deputies, candidates must first pass a civil service entrance examination and meet educational/experiential requirements. Candidates must also pass medical and psychological examinations, physical ability tests, and a full background investigation. In addition to deputy sheriffs, the Sheriff's Office employs sworn criminal investigators and an assortment of civilian support personnel.

The uniform of the Sheriff's Office is a typical NYC law enforcement agent's uniform, with a dark blue shirt with metal badge and collar pins, dark blue trousers, tie, jacket and peaked cap. The Field Support Unit wears a less formal version without metal badges and pins, and with writing on their shirts and jackets. A variety of vests, gloves and other appropriate gear for the season/duty can be worn.

== Institutional structure ==
The New York City Sheriff's Office is composed of three sections: Operations, Intelligence, and Support.

=== Operations section ===
The operations section is composed of the five county field offices and certain units working citywide. Within the county field offices, deputy sheriffs assigned to civil enforcement duties are referenced as Law Enforcement Bureau (LEB) personnel. LEB deputies perform a wide array of tasks such as evictions, civil arrest warrants, orders to commit, and the seizure and sale of property pursuant to judicial mandates. Businesses and individuals that owe the city money pursuant to unpaid tax warrants, environmental control board summons and fire and health code violation fines are targeted for enforcement action. LEB deputies also serve a wide variety of legal process, with orders of protection considered a priority. Each county field office is complemented by civilian support staff to assist in daily administrative functions and customer service.

The field offices are accessible to the public, giving citizens of the county/borough a local place to file court process in need of enforcement.

Deputies of the Operations Section may be assigned to duties separate from the LEB, either within a county field office or citywide. These duties include arrests and apprehensions on behalf of other non enforcement city agencies such as the Human Resources Administration, the Department of Health and Mental Hygiene and the Administration for Children's Services. Deputies may be assigned to scofflaw enforcement or security duties at the city treasury. The Operations Section will also provide deputies for any other assignment as deemed necessary by the agency.

=== Intelligence section ===
The intelligence section is composed of the Bureau of Criminal Investigation (BCI) and the Intelligence Unit. The BCI investigates city tax violation, real property larceny/deed fraud, synthetic narcotic enforcement (such as spice/K2 and bath salts) and offenses against the Department of Finance. The Intelligence Unit collects, analyzes, and disseminates information from various sources to be readily available for agency use.

=== Support section ===
The support section handles communications, property disposition, evidence destruction and field support services for the agency.

== Power and authority ==
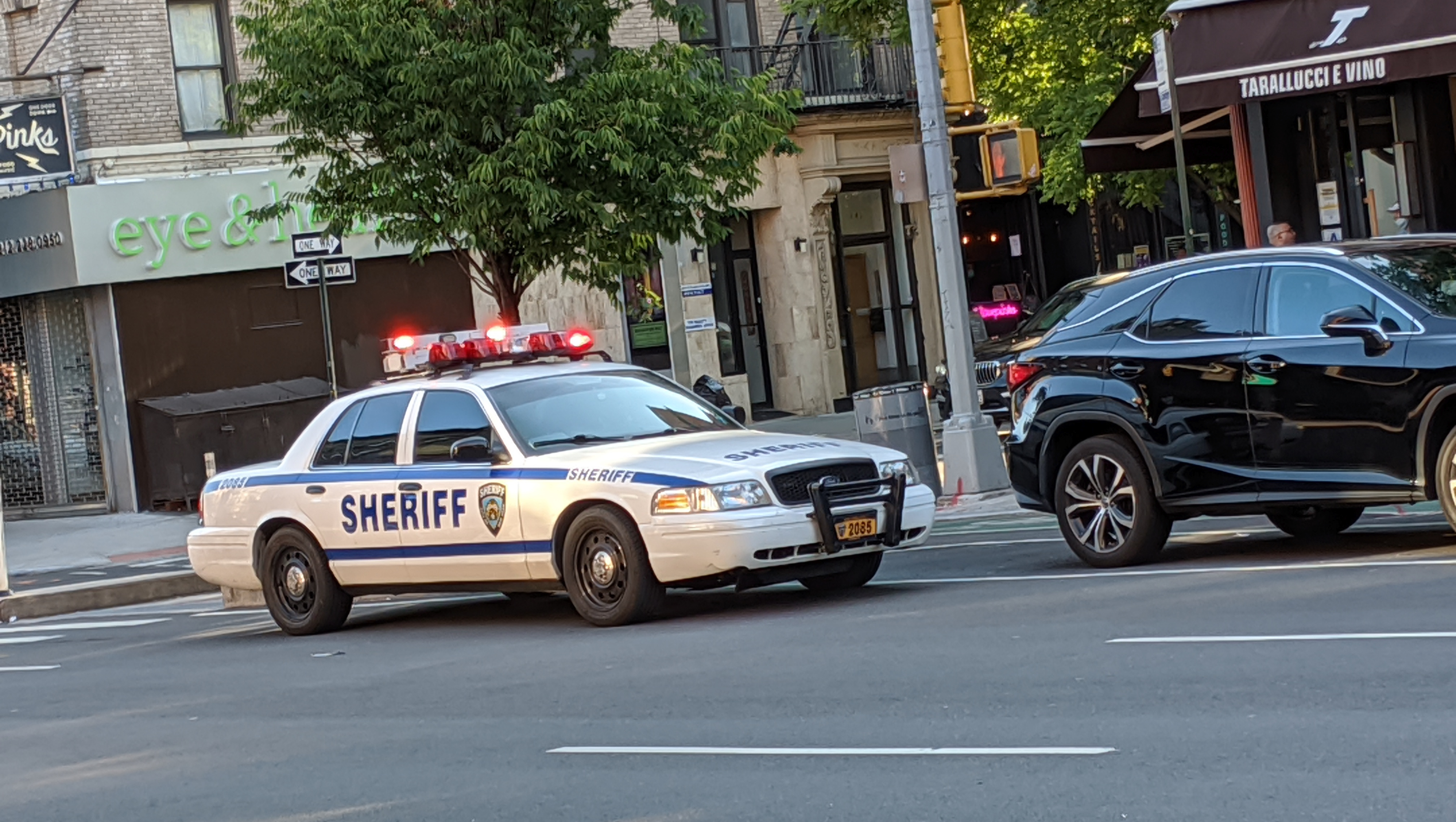
New York City Sheriff's Office Ford Crown Victoria Police Interceptor responding

Deputy sheriffs and criminal investigators (sheriff detective and sheriff investigator) are New York State peace officers with authority to make warrantless arrests, issue summonses, carry and use a firearm, conducted energy device, baton, pepper spray, and handcuffs. Deputy sheriffs receive their peace officer status pursuant to the New York State Criminal Procedure Law (CPL) §2.10 subdivision 2, while criminal investigators receive their peace officer status from CPL §2.10 subdivision 5.

Deputy sheriffs are also civil enforcement officers with authority to enforce the New York State Civil Practice Law and Rules (CPLR) concerning civil procedure.

== Special officers ==
The sheriff's office also employs special officers who support the deputy sheriffs and criminal investigators. Their uniform patch is similar to the NYPD's School Safety and Traffic Enforcement divisions, with "PUBLIC SAFETY" over the top of the sheriff patch, to distinguish them from deputies. Special officers work as part of the team of sheriff's deputies and detectives and perform bailiff functions and protect the NYC Finance Administrative Hearings Tribunal.

Ranks

1. Special Officer.
2. Special Officer Sergeant.

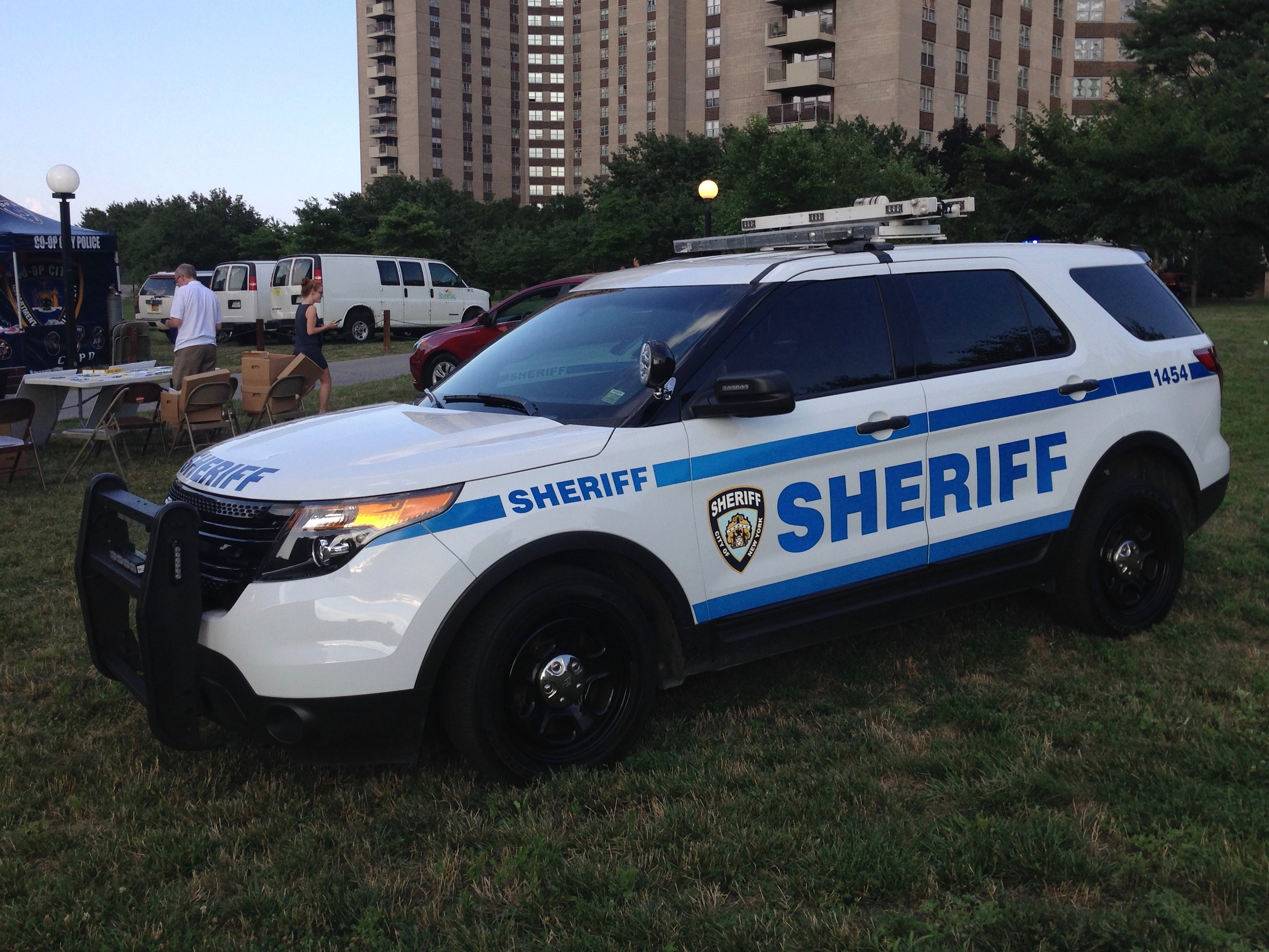
New York City Sheriff Ford Police Interceptor Utility

== See also ==
- List of law enforcement agencies in New York
- Law enforcement in New York City
- Coroner of New York City
