= New York City Human Resources Administration =

New York City government agency

Department of Social Services
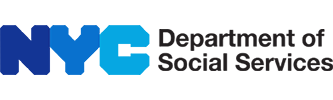

Department overview
- Formed: August 15, 1966; 60 years ago
- Preceding agencies: Department of Welfare; Addiction Services Agency; Community Development Agency; Manpower and Career Development Agency; Youth Services Agency; HRA Central Operations
- Jurisdiction: New York City
- Employees: 10,874 (FY 2026)
- Annual budget: $12.14 billion (FY 2026)
- Department executive: Erin Dalton, Commissioner of Social Services
- Child agencies: New York City Human Resources Administration; New York City Department of Homeless Services
- Key document: New York City Charter
- Website: www.nyc.gov/hra

The Human Resources Administration or Department of Social Services (HRA/DSS) is the department of the government of New York City in charge of the majority of the city's social services programs. HRA helps New Yorkers in need through a variety of services that promote employment and personal responsibility while providing temporary assistance and work supports. Its regulations are compiled in title 68 of the New York City Rules. The current commissioner of HRA is Erin Dalton, who was appointed to the position by Mayor Zohran Mamdani. HRA is the largest city social services agency in the United States. It has a budget of $9.7 billion, employs over 14,000 people, and serves over 3 million New Yorkers.

== History ==
=== New York Social Services Before HRA ===
Social services in some form have existed in New York City since shortly after the first settlers came to what was then the Dutch colony of New Amsterdam in the 1600s. Early programs were usually run by churches and private charities. As an English colony, New York's social services were based on the Elizabethan Poor Law of 1598-1601, in which the poor who could not work were cared for in a poorhouse. Those who could were employed in a workhouse. The first Poorhouse in New York was created in the 1740s, and was a combined Poorhouse, Workhouse, and House of Corrections.

As poverty increased in the 1800s, more private charities and public initiatives were created to deal with the issue. In the late 19th and early 20th centuries, many social work-based private charities merged with government agencies, and New York became a leader in developing social work-oriented public service organizations. The Great Depression was a catalyst for social service organizations to go further in addressing the needs of the poor and unemployed across the nation, and the New Deal led to an expansion in the type and amount of aid provided to low income families, and increased cooperation between public and private social service providers

=== Public safety ===
This agency employs Special Officers who provide on-site safety and security at 20 New York City Human Resources Administration facilities. These special officers have limited peace officer authority under New York State Criminal Procedure Law § 2.10(40) and HRA policy. NYC DHS Special Officers are prohibited by state law from carrying a firearm.

The New York City Police Department is the primary policing and investigation agency within New York City as per the NYC Charter, They respond to all incidents that occur at NYC Human Resources Administration facilities

=== Creation of HRA ===
The Human Resources Administration/Department of Social Services was created on August 15, 1966, by consolidating many of the city's existing social service administrations under Mayor John Lindsay’s Executive Order No. 28. The city agencies combined to form HRA included HRA Central Operations and the Department of Welfare, the Manpower and Career Development Agency, the Community Development Agency, Youth Services Agency and Addiction Services Agency. The Administration initially had two chief officers, the Administrator of the Human Resources Administration and the Commissioner of the Department of Social Services. In 1970, these positions were combined into the office of Commissioner. HRA was initially created as a ‘super-agency,’ housing all of the city's social service programs. In 1993, the Department of Homeless Services (DHS) became a separate city agency, and in 1996 the Administration for Children's Services (ACS) was also separated from HRA.

=== Welfare Reform ===
In 1996, President Bill Clinton signed the Personal Responsibility and Work Opportunity Reconciliation Act (PRWORA), more commonly known as welfare reform. This required social services agencies around the country to shift to a work-first philosophy that emphasized job training and employment services combined with temporary aid and work supports. The Aid to Families with Dependent Children (AFDC) program was replaced nationwide with Temporary Assistance to Needy Families (TANF). In 1998, the first phase of welfare reform was implemented in New York City under HRA Commissioner Jason Turner. The Agency's Income Support Centers were converted to Job Centers. Since the implementation of reforms in New York City, the Cash Assistance Caseload has declined to its lowest level since 1964, while enrollment in work support programs like Food Stamps has increased.

== HRA Programs ==
=== Cash Assistance ===
HRA's Family Independence Administration (FIA) provides temporary cash assistance under the Temporary Assistance to Needy Families (TANF) program and the New York State Safety Net program. Eligibility is based on factors such as income and family size. Participation in an employment or training program is required for anyone receiving temporary cash assistance.

=== Food Stamps ===
The Family Independence Administration also provides access to food stamps to low-income families and individuals. The food stamp program is known as SNAP, which stands for Supplemental Nutrition Assistance Program.

=== Employment Services ===
HRA's Employment Services, a part of the Family Independence Administration, connects HRA clients with employment and training opportunities in the private and public sector. Many employment services programs combine subsidized work and on-the-job training with guided job hunting and workshops on resume writing and interviewing skills.

=== Public Health Insurance ===
HRA used to provide healthcare services and information through the Medical Assistance Program. With the introduction of the Affordable Care Act, HRA now mainly caters towards specific Medicaid applicants, such as those over 65 or have disabilities.

=== Long Term Care Services ===
The Long Term Care Services Program offers a wide variety of in-home, community based or institutional assistance programs for the elderly and persons with disabilities who need medical care and help with daily tasks.

=== Home Care Services ===
The Home Care Services Program (HCSP) provides Medicaid-funded care programs to seniors or disabled individuals that allow them to remain safely in their homes, instead of a nursing home or other institution. Clients must be eligible for Medicaid to receive these services.

=== HIV/AIDS Services ===
The HIV/AIDS Services Administration (HASA) helps New Yorkers living with AIDS or HIV gain access to benefits and support. HASA clients may receive help with medical care, housing assistance, direct links to other HRA services such as food stamps, employment services, and counseling. HASA was first created as a unit serving clients with HIV/AIDS in 1985, then expanded into the Division of Aids Services and Income Support in 1995. In 2000 it became the HIV/AIDS Services Administration.

=== Domestic Violence and Emergency Intervention ===
The Office of Domestic Violence (ODV) provides support and temporary shelter for victims of domestic violence and their children. ODV can provide counseling and advocacy on a client's behalf, and help them obtain other HRA benefits they are eligible for.

=== Adult Protective Services ===
Adult Protective Services (APS) provides case management and services for mentally or physically impaired adults who are at risk of harm. APS assists adults suffering from abuse, neglect, financial exploitation or hazardous living conditions and provides them with service plans that help them live safely within their homes and communities.

=== Child Support Services ===
The Office of Child Support Services (OCSS) serves parents (both mothers and fathers) and guardians, regardless of income or immigration status. OCSS assists custodial parents in getting a child support order in place, facilitate the receipt and disbursement of child support payments, and refer unemployed noncustodial parents to employment services and other programs. OCSS also refers parents to mediation services to resolve disputes and participates in several outreach programs to promote responsible fatherhood.

=== Energy Assistance ===
The Home Energy Assistance Program (HEAP) provides assistance with heating bills and equipment repairs to low-income renters and homeowners.

=== Health Insurance Access ===
The Office of Citywide Health Insurance Access (OCHIA) helps connect uninsured New Yorkers with the NY State of Health. OCHIA operates NYC Health Insurance Link, a website which helps individuals and businesses understand insurance options.

== Organization ==
New York is divided into fifty-eight local social services districts. In New York City, the five boroughs (counties) compose one district, whereas outside of New York City each district corresponds to one county.

Administrative reviews ("Fair Hearings") are handled by the New York State Office of Temporary and Disability Assistance, Office of Administrative Hearings.

== List of Human Resources Administration Commissioners ==
List of Human Resources Administration Commissioners

- William Hodson - January 1934 — January 1943
- Leo Arnestein - February 1943 — January 1944
- Harry W. Marsh - February 1944 — June 1945
- Leonard Harrison - June 1945 — December 1945
- Edward E. Rhatigan - January 1946 — October 1947
- Benjamin Fielding - October 1947 — March 1948
- Raymond M. Hilliard - March 1948 — April 1951
- Henry L. McCarthy - May 1951 — August 1959
- James R. Dumpson - August 1959 — September 1965
- Joseph Louchheim - October 1965 — December 1965
- Philip Sokol - (Acting) January 1966 — February 1966
- Mitchell Ginsberg - February 1966 — December 1967 (Department of Social Services Commissioner)
- Mitchell Sviridoff - December 1966 — December 1967 (HRA Administrator)
- Jack Golberg - January 1968 — December 1970 (Department of Social Services Commissioner)
- Mitchell Ginsberg - December 1967 — July 1970 (HRA Administrator)
- Jule M. Sugarman - July 1970 — January 1974 (merged HRA Administrator and Department of Social Services Commissioner positions)
- James R. Dumpson - January 1974 — January 1976
- Henry J. Smith - March 1976 — January 1978
- Blanche Bernstein - January 1978 — May 1979
- Stanley Brezenoff - May 1979 - March 1981
- James A. Krauskopf - March 1981 — September 1984
- George Gross - October 1984 — June 1986
- Harvey Robbins - (Acting) June 1986 — December 1986
- William Grinker - December 1986 — November 1989
- Doby Flowers - November 1989 — April 1990
- Barbara J. Sabol - April 1990 — December 1993
- Marva L. Hammons - January 1994 — February 1997
- Lilliam Barrios-Paoli - February 1997 — December 1997
- Jason Turner - January 1998 — December 2001
- Verna Eggleston - January 2002 — January 2007
- Robert Doar - February 2007 — December 2013
- Kathleen Carlson - (Acting) January 2014 — March 2014
- Steven Banks - April 2014 — December 2021
- Gary Jenkins - January 2022 — March 2023
- Molly Wasow Park - April 2023 — January 2026
- Erin Dalton - February 2026 — Present

== See also ==
- New York State Office of Temporary and Disability Assistance
- New York City Administration for Children's Services
- Verna Eggleston
