= John Egglestone =

Australian cricketer (1847–1912)

Personal information
- Born: 1 July 1847; Hobart, Australia
- Died: 17 October 1912 (aged 65); Malvern East, Victoria, Australia

Domestic team information
- Years: Team
- 1869: Victoria
- Source: Cricinfo, 3 May 2015

John Egglestone (7 July 1847 – 17 October 1912) was an Australian cricketer. He played two first-class cricket matches for Victoria in 1869.

== See also ==
- List of Victoria first-class cricketers
