= Pat Egglestone =

English footballer (1927–2015)

Personal information
- Full name: Patrick Egglestone
- Date of birth: 17 March 1927
- Place of birth: Penrith, England
- Date of death: July 2015 (aged 88)
- Place of death: Corby, England
- Position: Goalkeeper

Youth career
- 1943–1944: Bradford City
- Leeds United
- Portsmouth

Senior career*
Years	Team	Apps	(Gls)
1948–1949	Bradford City	2	(0)
1949–1950	Halifax Town	20	(0)
1950–1953	Shrewsbury Town	109	(0)
1953–1956	Wrexham	84	(0)
- Corby Town
Total		215	(0)
- * Club domestic league appearances and goals

Patrick Egglestone (17 March 1927 – July 2015) was an English professional footballer who played as a goalkeeper. He made 215 appearances in the Football League playing for Bradford City, Halifax Town, Shrewsbury Town and Wrexham.

== Career ==
Born in Penrith, Egglestone played for Bradford City, Leeds United, Portsmouth, Halifax Town, Shrewsbury Town, Wrexham and Corby Town.

For Bradford City he made 2 appearances in the Football League.

== Sources ==
- Frost, Terry (1988). Bradford City A Complete Record 1903-1988. Breedon Books Sport. ISBN 0-907969-38-0.
