= New York City Police Department School Safety Division =

NYPD unit for school law enforcement

Coordinates: 40.712°N 74.002°W

- Shield of the New York City Police Department School Safety Division

- Flag of the New York City Police Department
- Common name: NYPD School Safety Division
- Abbreviation: NYPD/SSD
- Motto: Fidelis ad Mortem; Faithful till Death

Agency overview
- Formed: 1998
- Preceding agency: NYC Board of Education School Safety Division
- Annual budget: $243,335,196

Jurisdictional structure
- Operations jurisdiction: New York, New York, United States
- Map of New York City Police Department School Safety Division's jurisdiction
- Area: 468.9 square miles (1,214 km^{2})
- Population: 8,274,527
- Legal jurisdiction: New York City

Operational structure
- Headquarters: One Police Plaza (Leadership); 28-11 Queens Plaza North (Operations)
- School Safety Agents: 5,147
- Deputy Commissioner responsible: Mark T. Stewart
- Agency executives: Commanding Officer, Inspector Tracy S. Mulet
- Parent agency: New York City Police Department Community Affairs Bureau
- Boroughs: List: Manhattan North; Manhattan South; Brooklyn North; Brooklyn South; Queens North; Queens South; Bronx East; Bronx West; Staten Island

Facilities
- Schools: 1500+
- Police cars: Approx. 150

Website
- www.nyc.gov/html/nypd/html/careers/school_safety.shtml

The New York City Police Department School Safety Division is the law enforcement agency for New York City Department of Education schools. The agency is a division of the New York City Police Department Community Affairs Bureau and is one of the largest school-based law enforcement agencies in New York City and the United States. It has approximately 5,000 School Safety Agents (SSA's) and 200 police officers. The division costs approximately $750 million a year to run.

== History ==
The New York City Police Department School Safety Division was formed in 1998 when the School Safety Division was transferred from the New York City Department of Education to the New York City Police Department. Since then, the School Safety Division has expanded in duties and in number of officers. In 2006, NYPD school safety agents were classified Civil Service Status with the first DCAS Civil Service exam given on June 9, 2007.

== Power and Authority ==
School Safety Agents are designated as New York City Special Patrolmen. School Safety Agents can make warrant-less arrests, carry and use handcuffs, and use physical force or deadly force, if necessary, to keep students, teachers, staff, and fellow agents safe.

School Safety Agents are classified as peace officers under the New York Criminal Procedure Law.

== Uniform and Vehicles ==
School Safety Agents wear French blue uniform shirts with dark blue pants, almost identical to the NYPD's traffic enforcement agents (TEAs) with the exception of their eight-point uniform caps. SSAs use the dark blue caps, just as uniformed police officers do. Their shield is oval with an eagle on top, in contrast to the shield worn by police officers. Vehicles were formerly dark blue with white decals and now are white with light blue decals similarly to those of patrol officers.

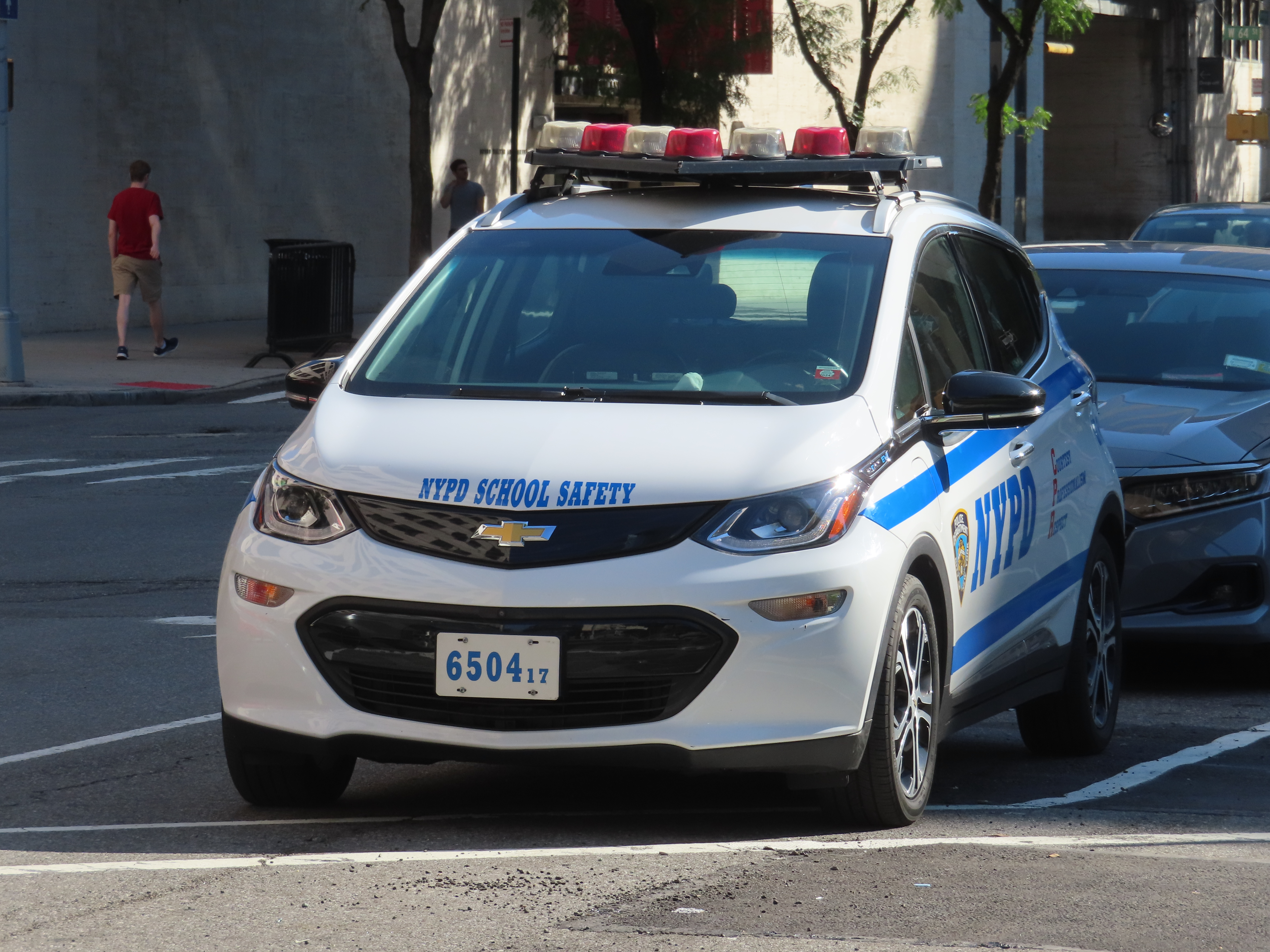
A NYPD School Safety Chevrolet Bolt

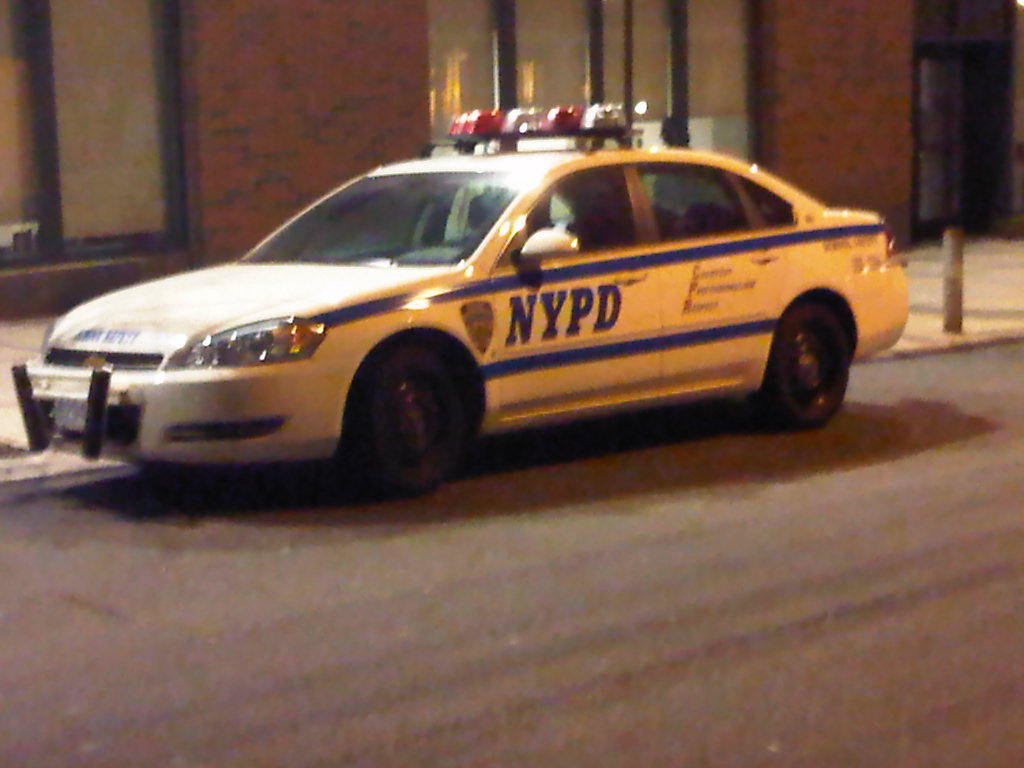
A NYPD School Safety Chevrolet Impala in white livery

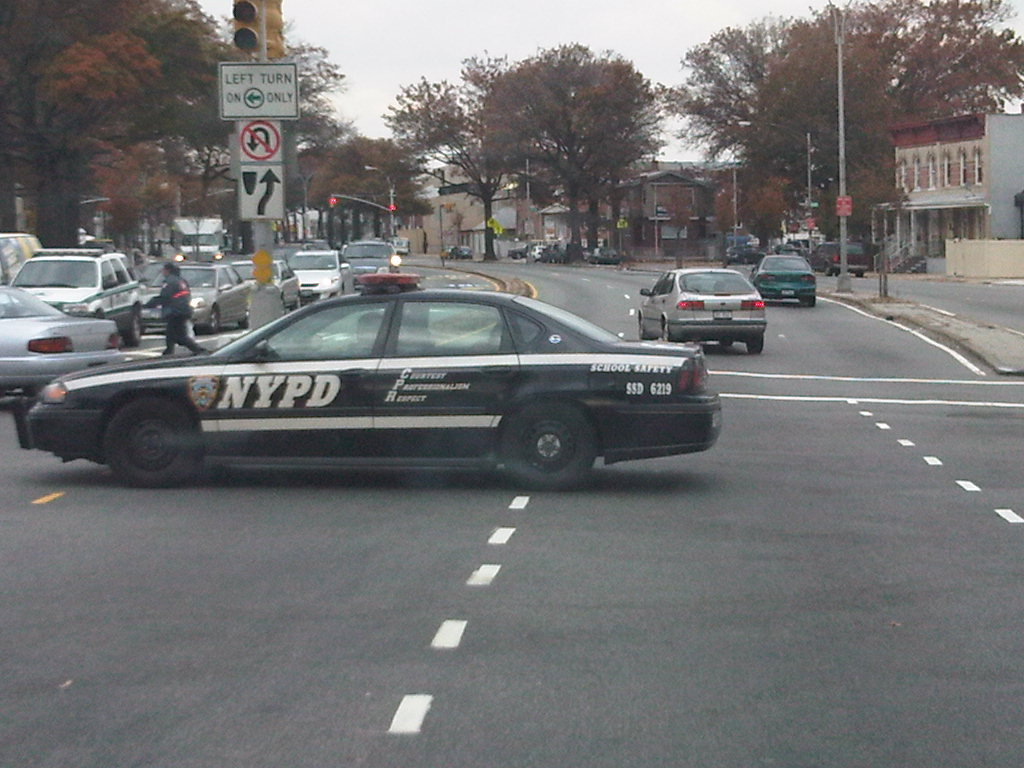
A NYPD School Safety Chevrolet Impala in the formerly used dark blue livery

== Deaths ==
Since the establishment of the New York City Police Department School Safety Division, two Agents have died while on duty, one in 1999 and one in 2005. Both deaths were caused by heart attack.

On November 16, 1999, School Safety Agent Orville M. Williams died after suffering a fatal heart attacking after responding to and breaking up several fights. Agent Williams and his partner broke up one fight and were called to another on the third floor of the building. After breaking up the second fight, Agent Williams was taking a student to the Principal's office when he collapsed. Agent Williams had worked in his role for two years.

School Safety Agent Vivian A. Samuels-Benjamin died on December 16, 2005, after suffering a heart attacked after being assaulted by a student inside I.S. 390 in Brooklyn. Agent Samuels-Benjamin was working a holiday dance and was attempting to remove a 12-year-old student that has been causing a disturbance. The student struck Agent Samuels-Benjamin twice in the head causing the 56-year-old agent to fall on the ground. Two other agents on the scene rushed to assist Samuels-Benjamin and take the suspect into custody. Agent Samuels-Benjamin served with the School Safety Division for 24 years.

== Training ==
As new recruits, Probationary School Safety Agents (PSSA's) are assigned to the NYPD Police Academy located in College Point, Queens for 20 weeks. In those 20 weeks, Agents are taught Procedural Law, Criminal / Constitutional Law, Crisis Intervention/Resolution, Substantive Law, Terrorism Awareness and Emergency Preparedness, School Policing Special Populations, School Police Investigation and Reporting. Active Shooter / Threats, and Patrol Operations just to name a few. Recruits also train in Physical Fitness, Defensive Tactics, and American Heart Association Basic Life Support.

== Rank Structure ==
Title	Insignia
Executive Director	No Insignia
Director	
Deputy Director	
Associate Supervisor - Level II	
Associate Supervisor - Level I	
Supervisor of School Security	
School Safety Agent - Level III	
School Safety Agent - MTF	No Insignia
School Safety Agent - Level I	No Insignia

BOROUGH COMMAND STRUCTURE

- Commanding Officer: Associate Supervisor of School Security II
- Executive Officer: Associate Supervisor of School Security I
- Integrity Control Officer: Lieutenant or Supervisor of School Security
- Assistant Integrity Control Officer: Sergeant / SSS / SSA-III
- Field Intelligence Agent: SSA-III or SSA-I
- Training Supervisor: SSA-III
- Special Operation Supervisor: SSS
- Platoon Commander: SSS
- Supervisor of School Security: Per Geographical Area / Precincts
- Immediately Supervisor: SSA-III
- Mobile Task Force, MTF: SSA-I
- School Safety Agents Level 1 (SSA-I)

== Official Duties ==
School Safety Agents are often seen on the perimeters of the city's schools and inside the halls of all middle and high schools. SSAs may have only one agent in the school or many, depending on the size of the school and the student population. Additionally, some Agents are assigned to squad cars, or RMP's in NYPD parlance, to respond to incidents and emergencies. Due to the peace officer status of the Agents, some assist in taking emergency calls adjacent to school grounds.

SSD separates Agents by "levels" with a civilian assistant commissioner of the New York City Police Department overseeing the administrative functions of the division.

Agents are eligible for promotion via examinations administered by the New York City Department of Citywide Administrative Services, the city agency charged with civil service examinations.

This division is not to be confused with the NYPD school crossing guards, who are civilian employees with no police or peace officer powers. However, the two divisions often work hand in hand to provide both safe travel to and from school, as well as safety inside the facilities and classrooms operated by the city's public school system.

== See also ==
- List of law enforcement agencies in New York
- Law enforcement in New York City
- New York City Police Commissioner
- Security police
