= Eggleston, Minnesota =

Neighborhood in Red Wing, Minnesota, USA

Coordinates: 44°37′12″N 92°40′20″W

Eggleston is a neighborhood of the city of Red Wing in Goodhue County, Minnesota, United States.

The center of Eggleston is generally considered at the junction of Goodhue County Roads 18 and 19.

Previously, Eggleston was its own unincorporated community before it was annexed by the city of Red Wing.

Nearby places include Welch Township and Miesville. Also nearby are Goose Lake, Treasure Island Resort and Casino, and the Mississippi River.

== History ==
Eggleston was named after John E. Eggleston and Joseph Eggleston, who settled at the portion of the community in what was then Burnside Township. From 1875 to 1934, the community had a post office. The community also had a train station on the Chicago, Milwaukee, St Paul and Pacific Railroad.
