= Vintage Life =

British fashion and lifestyle magazine

Vintage Life Magazine
- Former editors: Rae Egglestone
- Staff writers: Lisa Evans
- Categories: Fashion/ Lifestyle magazine
- Frequency: Monthly
- Publisher: Dragoon Publishing
- Founded: 2010
- Country: United Kingdom
- Language: English
- Website: www.vintagelifemagazine.com
- ISSN: 2052-8825

Vintage Life is a British glossy fashion and lifestyle magazine, published by Dragoon Publishing, focusing on the 1920s–1970s. It was founded in 2010 by British entrepreneur Rae Egglestone. Issue 1 was launched digitally in April 2010 and a print version started from issue 2. Since then, the magazine has developed from a bi-monthly handbag-sized 72-page magazine to a glossy 148-page monthly publication available in WH Smith and Sainsbury's. From May 2015, Vintage Life has been stocked in London's Selfridges and Harrods stores.

Vintage Life contains articles on a wide variety of vintage subjects, such as fashion and vintage clothing, hair and make-up tutorials, wellbeing issues, recipes, reviews and places and people of interest. Articles are contributed by a number of experts in their chosen field, including Green Goddess Diana Moran. The magazine also features singers, artists, films, theatre and TV with a vintage theme, including Paloma Faith, Dawn O'Porter, Imelda May, Downton Abbey, Mr Selfridge, Call The Midwife, Dita Von Teese and Caro Emerald.

The magazine is published by Dragoon Publishing Ltd, in Cheshire and is printed and distributed by Warners Midlands PLC.

== Previous Editor ==
Rae Egglestone

== Achievements and awards ==
Dragoon Publishing - Winners of the Network She Business of the Year award, 2015.

Rae Egglestone - shortlisted for the Network She Business Woman of the Year award.

Rae Egglestone - shortlisted for the North West Insiders Young Professionals Awards Young Marketing and Media Professional.
