= Verna Eggleston =

American politician

Verna Eggleston served as the Commissioner for New York City's Human Resources Administration (HRA) for the Bloomberg Administration, appointed by former New York Mayor Michael R. Bloomberg. She was the longest serving Commissioner of the agency, serving in this role from 2002 to 2007, and was the first Commissioner appointed to the position twice by the same sitting Mayor. Under her leadership, HRA developed "We Care", a Mayoral initiative which received the 2008 Innovation Award from the United States Department of Labor. in 2016, Eggleston received the Civic Leadership Award from the Citizens Committee in New York, where she serves as a permanent member, representing Bloomberg Philanthropies in "consultative status with the United Nations Economic and Social Development Council."

Eggleston had previously served as Administrator of Child Welfare under Mayor Ed Koch, as Director of New York City's Family Shelter programs under Mayor David Dinkins, and served as the Executive Director of the Hetrick-Martin Institute. She also opened New York City's first AIDS facility for HIV-infected infants. Her work has included service on the National Board of Directors for the Child Welfare League of America; consultation on the Oprah Bill with Oprah Winfrey and the former governor of Illinois; and advocacy, along with former President Bill Clinton, Vice President Al Gore, New York State Senator Hillary Clinton, and Attorney General Janet Reno for hate crimes legislation, youth violence prevention, and adolescent mental health issues.

Effective January 31, 2007, Eggleston left her post at HRA to "research and develop" projects of the Bloomberg Family Foundation, a private organization founded by the Mayor to support public health, medical research, education and the arts. Robert Doar, the former Commissioner of the New York State Office of Temporary and Disability Assistance, was named as her successor.
