= New York City Department of Investigation =

New York City government agency

- DOI
- Department of Investigation

Department overview
- Formed: July 18, 1873
- Type: Local civilian police & Inspector General
- Jurisdiction: New York City
- Headquarters: Financial District, Manhattan, New York City
- Motto: "New York City's Watchdogs"
- Employees: 352 (2024)
- Department executive: Nadia I. Shihata, Commissioner
- Key document: New York City Charter
- Website: www.nyc.gov/doi

The New York City Department of Investigation (DOI) is a law enforcement agency of the government of New York City that serves as an independent and nonpartisan watchdog for New York City government.

== Functions ==
DOI has broad jurisdiction, and is authorized to investigate fraud, waste, misconduct, abuse of authority, and unethical conduct in New York City. DOI may also investigate any activity when directed by the Mayor or the City Council, or may investigate activities that the Commissioner of Investigation believes are in the best interest of the City.

Major functions include investigating and referring for prosecution cases of fraud, corruption, misconduct and unethical conduct by City employees, contractors, and others who receive City money or do business with the City.

DOI is also charged with studying agency procedures to identify corruption hazards and recommending improvements in order to reduce the City's vulnerability to fraud, waste, and corruption. DOI also investigates the backgrounds of persons selected to work in decision-making or sensitive City jobs, and conducts checks on companies and their principals to help agencies determine if they are companies that can be awarded City contracts.

DOI is empowered to issue subpoenas, take testimony under oath, and issue reports of its investigative findings. DOI can forward its findings to federal and state prosecutors, which can result in arrests. It can also refer its findings to the City's Conflicts of Interest Board, and other agencies who make disciplinary or other administrative decisions. Under the City Charter, DOI serves as the investigative arm of the City's Conflicts of Interest Board.

DOI currently has oversight of about 300,000 City employees in 45 City agencies; dozens of Boards and Commissions; the Office of the Inspector General for the New York City Housing Authority; and, as of 2014, the independent Office of the Inspector General for the New York City Police Department (OIG-NYPD).

== Jurisdiction ==
Unlike most law enforcement agencies, DOI's jurisdiction is not geographically limited, but is instead limited by subject matter. DOI has jurisdiction over fraud, waste, abuse of authority, and criminal wrongdoing committed by City employees, contractors, benefit recipients, or business associates committed anywhere.

Though most of its investigations occur within New York City or the surrounding areas, DOI may inquire about activities that occurred outside of New York when such activity is related to DOI's subject matter jurisdiction.

When arresting wrongdoers, DOI's investigators, who are considered New York state peace officers, may make an arrest in any place within New York where their investigation legitimately takes them.

== Organization ==
The DOI Commissioner is a mayoral appointee, but must be confirmed by the City Council. To remove the DOI Commissioner, the Mayor has to state the reasons in writing and provide an opportunity for the Commissioner to respond publicly.

The DOI's investigators conduct its investigations, arrest criminals, and oversee city employees, contractors, grantees, and beneficiaries.

== History ==
The DOI was founded in 1873 as the Office of the Commissioners of Accounts as a result of the Boss Tweed and Tammany Hall scandals.

In 1938, as the result of a Charter revision, the agency's name was changed to the Department of Investigation.

== See also ==
- Inspector general
