= Killing of Nixzmary Brown =

7-year-old American girl killed by stepfather

Nixzmary Brown
- Born: July 18, 1998; Waterbury, Connecticut, U.S.
- Died: January 11, 2006 (aged 7); New York City, U.S.
- Cause of death: Murder
- Resting place: Cypress Hills Cemetery
- Known for: Child abuse
- Parent(s): Nixzaliz Santiago (mother); Micheal Brown (father); Abdurrahman Mian (biological father)
- Relatives: César Rodriguez (stepfather)

Nixzmary Brown (July 18, 1998 – January 11, 2006) was a seven-year-old American girl from Brooklyn, New York, whose physical abuse, parental neglect and murder led to reforms in New York City's Administration for Children's Services.

== Murder ==
Brown had endured torture, and was later learned to have been bound, molested, beaten, and killed by her stepfather César Rodriguez, in a state of rage that began over a cup of yogurt and a broken printer that he claimed was her fault.

On the night of January 10, 2006, Rodriguez beat Brown to death with both fists and his thick leather belt. Her mother, Nixzaliz Santiago, ignored Rodriguez as he slammed Brown's head into a bathtub and doused her with cold water. Both Santiago and Rodriguez were charged with second-degree murder and child endangerment. Rodriguez was convicted on the verdict of first-degree manslaughter and other charges and was sentenced to 29 years in prison. Rodriguez and Santiago each accused the other of inflicting the final, fatal blow. Traces of Brown's DNA were found on Rodriguez's belt.

=== Previous abuse ===
Evidence of previous abuse inflicted on Brown came to light, and the news coverage of her murder case later drew public attention to New York City Administration for Children's Services (ACS). ACS had received two complaints about Brown's family. The first, made in 2004, remained unsubstantiated. The second complaint was made on December 1, 2005, when Brown showed up at school with a black eye. Another story in January 2006 brought more details of the ACS involvement. Blame was eventually assigned to the ACS by the news media and six Children's Services employees were disciplined. The Bloomberg administration noted that the ACS was responding by hiring 525 more workers.

In March 2006, a city panel—created by Mayor Michael Bloomberg in response to Brown's death—advocated multiple changes, some of which included better communication with school officials regarding absenteeism, a 24-hour hotline, instant-response teams, and new training for police personnel regarding sensitivity to abused children. The key changes included:

[T]he police for the first time will assign a full-time supervisor, a lieutenant, to child welfare headquarters to be a liaison between the two agencies. Caseworkers will be required to seek entry orders when denied access to the home of a child suspected to be at risk of neglect or abuse. And school officials will have more licenses to alert the authorities when a student has too many unexplained absences.

=== Funeral ===
Nixzmary Brown's funeral was held at St. Mary's Church on Manhattan's Lower East Side, although her family had never lived there. According to a Newsday report, there was considerable anger during the burial, with two sides of Brown's family present. Rodriguez's sister, Iris, showed up unexpectedly and her appearance prompted shouts by others to leave, and at least one comment of "not being welcome."

== Immediate aftermath ==
In a City Council hearing on the ACS in September 2007, announced by then-Councilman Bill de Blasio, the chairman of the General Welfare Committee, which has jurisdiction over the ACS, De Blasio cited the death of 21-month-old Hailey Gonzalez after she was allegedly beaten by her mother's boyfriend and the death of a two-month-old after the child was allegedly shaken by his mother in a homeless shelter. The Councilman said that the ACS had made some progress but noted that children were still being lost.

On January 13, 2008, a former ACS supervisor, Roger Moore, came forward to discuss with the New York Daily News the failure of the ACS and how opportunities were lost because of another child-murder involving a 16-month-old boy and other factors. Moore discussed that because of the issue of the drowning of the little boy in a bathtub, the issue of Brown was not even discussed. There were discussions of a lack of follow-up work not being done by caseworkers and supervisors in Brooklyn regarding the abuse in Brown's case. ACS Commissioner John Mattingly mentioned to the Daily News editorial board that there were various methods that could have been used, but were not. He also mentioned that the ACS could have brought pressure on Brown's family to reveal more about the girl's condition; that they could have paid more attention to reports from Brown's school staff and could have sought a warrant to enter into Brown's home, but none of these measures were used. Mayor Michael Bloomberg had entered into the discussion by asking in this Daily News article: "Why the caseworkers didn't push further, harder — that's what we are investigating today."

By March 2008, the ACS had launched a $1M recruitment drive for new child welfare caseworkers. It was reported that the agency was getting many applications, but retention of caseworkers was a great problem. It was further reported that in 2007, 17 percent of the city's caseworkers had quit. The pay for the position was reported as starting at $39,000. Videos and other illustrations of the difficulty of the position are currently being used in the recruitment process.

Numerous child felonies had surfaced and were reported in the news media in 2008, including the murder of an 8-month-old named Elijah Rodriguez. Public Advocate Betsy Gotbaum stated in October 2008 that at least 28 children had died since 2004 "under suspicious circumstances".

=== Legislation ===
"Nixzmary's Law" was proposed in January 2006 by New York State senator Joseph Bruno, shortly after Nixzmary's murder. The law is designed to deter or prevent child abuse related crimes by charging parents connected to the crime of the death of their children with first degree murder, the maximum punishment for which in New York State would be 25 years to life in prison without the possibility of parole.

Since passage of the law, reports have increased to New York State's child abuse hotline. According to an article published by the New York Daily News regarding the law, "Driving the trend is increased public awareness of the hotline."

Legislation in the form of a Bill sent to New York Governor Paterson was approved by the state's Senate to target those individuals who have killed a child, especially in a "cruel and wanton manner".

== Cesar Rodriguez's trial ==
=== Start of trial ===
Jury selection had begun during the week of January 6, 2008, and the defense objective was to focus on the ACS and the parents. The defense lawyer for Rodriguez was Jeffrey T. Schwartz, who had competed in 2006 to represent Darryl Littlejohn in the murder case of Imette St. Guillen.

Prosecutors were insistent that the judge allow jurors to see seven pictures of the dead girl at the start of the testimony. The assistant district attorney (also known as assistant DA or simply ADA) wanted one of the pictures introduced to "refute claims by Rodriguez and the girl's mother, Nixzaliz Santiago, that she (Nixzmary) drowned." The issue of child discipline was also raised by the prosecutor. Prosecution had planned to show crime-scene photos at the trial, calling it a case of torture.

The jury composition was ten women and two men; nine of them had children of their own. The jury was composed of nine black females, one black male, and two white females, with almost all of the women having children. The lawyers had selected six alternate jurors in case any jurors could not continue during the trial period.

During opening remarks given on January 16, 2008, Assistant DA Ama Dwimoh told the Brooklyn jurors that "It was inevitable her life would end the way it did: battered and beaten, left alone on the floor, moaning until she could no longer hold onto life". Defense lawyer Schwartz countered D.A. Dwimoh's remarks by indicating that Rodriguez was "a loving family man"; that Brown's mother was "deeply, deeply disturbed," and that the little girl herself was troubled.

=== Details and evidence of Brown's abuse and death ===
It was reported that Brown was confined to a spare room in the apartment with dirty mattresses, a broken radiator, an old wooden school chair with a rope, and a litter box. Further, Brown was said to be "routinely tied to the chair, raped, [and] beaten repeatedly with a belt and fists. Also reported were crime-scene photos taken in the family's three-bedroom apartment, as well as a videotape of Rodriguez casting blame on Brown." Schwartz had said outside of the courtroom on Wednesday that his client was only guilty of being "a strict disciplinarian" and he then reiterated claims that Brown's mother was responsible. He then made a statement that as the trial continued, the jury would soon learn who the actual "monster" [sic] was in Brown's murder.

On January 18, the trial focused on household items which were transformed into instruments of torture for Brown. The chief object was the chair that Brown was tied to. A white nylon cord was still attached to the chair. A bungee cord and duct tape, which Rodriguez allegedly used to cinch Brown's ankles to the chair, were also shown to the jury.

It was reported on the January 21 trial portion that "Brown weighed just 36 pounds when police found her beaten to death on the floor of her Brooklyn apartment, but her family's fridge was anything but empty." Jurors saw crime-scene photographs "of a well-stocked refrigerator full of milk, pancake mix, salami, tortillas, cream cheese, lettuce—and the yogurt that Nixzmary was punished for stealing the night she died."

In an attempt to show Rodriguez in a favorable light, a drinking mug was shown at the Tuesday portion of the trial by the defense lawyer with the title "World's Greatest Dad", to show the jury that Rodriguez did not murder Brown. Schwartz commented on the relationship between Brown and Rodriguez. Assistant D.A. Ama Dwimoh rebuked the whole idea of Rodriguez ever being a good father to Brown. Further court discussion centered on the black leather belt that Rodriguez used to allegedly hit Brown. According to prosecutors, there were traces of Brown's DNA on the belt.

=== New evidence and trial delays ===
New evidence was presented at the close of the trial on January 23, 2008. A gag order was issued by the court. Mention was made of Rodriguez's "petty criminal record". It was anticipated that this new evidence would be revealed on or after January 23. However, for a second time, jurors were sent home on Thursday. It was reported that both sides in the court case refused to talk about developments. A 'gag' order was in place and the Daily News was attempting to lift the order. The next time that jurors would meet would be on January 28, 2008.

The trial was delayed on January 23 and continued for a fourth day. It was later revealed that the unexplained delays were due to a new witness. Judge Priscilla Hall held a "sealed hearing" because of witness' safety concerns. The gag order remained to prevent either side from speaking about the case. A number of newspapers had filed papers seeking to lift the gag order. It was further revealed that Brown's blood was found in numerous areas of the spare room she was kept in. The expert brought forth to testify, Taylor Dickerson, said that her DNA profile was clearly present. The chief prosecutor said she was tortured and the blood found on the jeans that her stepfather wore on January 11 belonged to Brown.

=== More testimony ===
It had been revealed in a few news reports in January 2008 that a social worker for Brown's school at P.S. 256, Margarita Cotto, had become concerned with Brown's case and reported her findings to the ACS. She had pleaded with the child welfare workers to remove Brown from her parents, and tried, in vain, to enter Brown's apartment but was barred from entering by Rodriguez. On May 16, 2005, a guidance counselor who had filed two abuse reports contacted the state child abuse hotline about Brown's bruises and also made note that Brown had been absent from school for 46 days. Later, an ACS caseworker visited Brown's home, but the caseworker could not verify the abuse charge and accepted Brown's mother's word that Brown would return to her school. The jury was shown a video depicting the family shopping on Monday, January 9, 2006, while Brown was left home. The shopping occurred at a Target store in Downtown Brooklyn, the Atlantic Center Mall. The specific toy items being purchased were Power Ranger action figures, Hot Wheels cars, Play-Doh, Bratz dolls, etc. Brown is not seen in the video, and the defense lawyer claimed that the video did not prove anything.

Rodriguez's defense lawyer, Jeffrey T. Schwartz, claimed that he was never read his Miranda rights, and that his constitutional rights were violated. The discussion then turned to the actual arrest of Rodriguez. On February 4, the jurors watched a video statement showing Rodriguez talking about the abuse he inflicted on Brown. Prosecutors believed the video to be "the most damning evidence". Prosecutor Ama Dwimoh said, "He calmly and coldly talks about how he would beat Nixzmary Brown." Rodriguez's lawyer, Schwartz, attacked the video by cross-examining Det. Steven Sneider, who was presenting the video evidence. At one point, Schwartz called for a mistrial but his motion was denied. Schwartz then stated to the jury that Rodriguez was taking responsibility for wounds inflicted by Brown's mother, Nixzaliz.

At the Wednesday, February 6 portion of the trial, Schwartz made a comment concerning the prosecutor as having possible porn in her home. Brooklyn Supreme Court Justice L. Priscilla Hall then reprimanded Schwartz for that remark after the jury was dismissed for lunch. Schwartz, according to a news report, had been complaining that prosecutors had "sandbagged" his defense of Rodriguez using Brown's backpack and other personal items. The prosecutor replied that the jury had no interest in seeing what else was found at the apartment: piles of pornography. Schwartz responded saying that pornography is not illegal, and later implied that Dwimoh had pornography at her house.

Forensic photographs were shown to the jury on Thursday, February 7. Barbara Sampson of the medical examiner's office said on the stand that the bruises were only hours or days old. It was indicated that a head blow Brown received two days before she died was the cause of her death. "She was unconscious and going into respiratory depression for at least several hours before she died," Dr. Barbara Sampson informed jurors. It was further learned that neither Rodriguez nor Santiago did anything to help Brown during the hemorrhage. Further photographs of Brown were shown to the jury to back up Sampson's diagnosis. Sampson said in court that the blow to Brown's head was the "straw that broke the camel's back" and she further stated that Brown died from "child abuse syndrome." Dr. Barbara Sampson also provided the following details during the day's trial, saying that Brown had been somnolent and then in a coma. Sampson indicated that Brown probably had progressive respiratory depression and perhaps had made moaning and groaning sounds, and was also gasping for air. Sampson further indicated that subdural hematoma was the mechanism of her death.

A specialist for the ACS, Vanessa Rhoden, had reported that on December 1, 2005, she had witnessed early signs of abuse in Brown but was rebuffed by Rodriguez. Rodriguez had told Rhoden that he had taken Brown to the hospital, and then used swear words to address her and end the conversation. This revelation took defense lawyer Schwartz off-guard during the Tuesday, February 19 trial portion because he had called Rhoden to the stand to show the court and the jury that there was no cause for alarm at that time. It was after this meeting that it was reported that ACS tried further visits to Brown's family's apartment but was refused each time. Rhoden testified in court on Tuesday, February 19 that Rodriguez cursed her when she made inquiries concerning "lacerations, bruises and welts" on the girl. She further testified that Brown's mother attempted to show her a fetus kept in a jar in the family's apartment. Rhoden indicated that she was disturbed by this revelation and so recommended mental health counseling for Brown's mother. It was further indicated that Rhoden did not believe Brown was in an unsafe environment and so she did not make any motion to have Brown or the other children removed from the family.

Defense lawyer Schwartz was planning on calling Rodriguez's mother-in-law, Maria Gonzalez, to the witness stand during the week of February 24. Schwartz's defense strategy of Rodriguez involved blaming his wife, Nixzaliz Santiago, and showing that she was the actual murderer. In February 2008, Maria Gonzalez, Brown's grandmother, sued New York city for $150 million for negligence, and the failure of the ACS to act on behalf of her granddaughter. Gonzalez finally provided her testimony during the Wednesday, March 6 portion of the trial. Gonzalez, however, used the opportunity to defend the $150 million lawsuit that she had filed. Gonzalez testified that Santiago had left home for a man at the age of 17, that she had six more children, and that she continued to depend upon other men for her welfare. Further testimony by Gonzalez resulted in her testimony denying the continued trial allegations of Schwartz that Brown was a "wild child". She further indicated that Brown and her siblings were in fear of Rodriguez.

An emergency room doctor was called to the witness stand during the February 21, 2008, trial portion and reported that he had witnessed no signs of abuse on Brown after a medical exam seven weeks before Brown's death in which Rodriguez brought the little girl to the hospital. When prosecutor Linda Weinman had grilled him as to whether he made a report, and the doctor said 'no', the prosecutor indicated that his decision was a mistake, but the physician indicated that he did not know at the time. The official hospital records from the November 29, 2005, visit say "No other bruises present."

On February 25, testimony was expected to be given by a Suffolk County medical examiner, Dr. Charles Wetli, supposedly putting the Prosecution's case in jeopardy. It was expected that the testimony would ruin Prosecution's argument that Brown was the victim of child abuse syndrome. However, Wetli indicated that Brown was definitely killed by a blow to her head. This conflicted with Defense's argument that Brown was never hit on her head.

In the February 26 trial portion, it was indicated that the constant Defense argument that Brown was killed because she caused Santiago to have a miscarriage was found groundless because Prosecutor Linda Weinman told jurors that Santiago had confided in a psychiatrist that she blamed Rodriguez because of a "beating". She revealed from the report that, in November 2005, Rodriguez had choked and thrown her to the floor and, within hours, Santiago had miscarried. There was discussion as to whether the report was admissible in court. Schwartz contended that the report proved Santiago a liar, while Weinmam wanted the report kept confidential. Schwartz had said of Santiago that "she believed Nixzmary caused the miscarriage and I know that based on what my client has said to me and to the police from day one." Schwartz also maintains that it was Santiago who delivered the death blow to Brown.

=== Attorney change and apology for delays ===
On February 27, the lawyer for Nixzaliz Santiago, Robert Abrams, removed himself from the case citing "communication difficulties". Santiago believed, according to the article, that a psychiatric evaluation given to the defense would harm her case.

The judge in the murder case apologized to jurors about the delays in the trial. Reportedly, the trial never started before 10:30 a.m. and rarely went past 5 p.m. Jurors were sent home five times without hearing any testimony and were getting long lunch breaks and a half-day every Friday. It was also reported by Schwartz that witnesses were "hostile" and "stalled their appearances".

=== Accusations that Santiago was the murderer ===
It was reported that a secret witness, later identified as a Riker's Island inmate, was claiming that Brown's mother was her murderer. There was also mention of a secret diary, which was a collection of handwritten notes that the inmate took during her time in jail with Santiago. Prosecutors have dismissed that witness as unreliable, but the defense wanted her to take the stand. It was reported that if the witness were to testify, it could be in a closed-door hearing for safety reasons. During the Tuesday, March 4 portion of the trial, the jurors finally heard the testimony of the inmate/witness. This testimony by the inmate also revealed that she may have hurt Rodriguez in the past. One person later commented that this witness may have helped the prosecution more than the defense as the testimony was supposed to focus the blame for Brown's death on Santiago. It was later published in a newspaper that the unidentified inmate revealed a story of the sexual abuse of Brown. She revealed that Santiago had desired to hurt Brown because she discovered Rodriguez making Brown have oral sex with him.

According to the inmate's verbal testimony, which she recorded in a set of composition books, the inmate indicated that Santiago "told me her child was a bad kid and her and her husband killed her." The inmate also said that Santiago despised her daughter and defended Rodriguez. According to the article, the inmate reading from a May 15, 2006, journal entry said that Santiago had said "that her husband was a good man and the child was evil". The inmate said that Santiago referred to Brown as "diablo" ("devil"). It was further noted in the article that the sexual charges against Rodriguez had been dropped before the trial and that the medical examiner had indicated that there were no signs of sexual abuse.

=== Trial conclusion ===
On March 11, Schwartz had concluded the defense portion of the case. As the trial was nearing its end, closing arguments were given. Prosecutor Ama Dwimoh once again showed the photos of a tortured Brown. Dwimoh made comments that, "He's nothing short of a murderer"; "Now he's having you believe, 'it ain't me; it's my wife.' Hmmm!" and then argued, "There is nothing that 7-year-old Nixzmary Brown could ever do to deserve that." Dwimoh had declared that even in death, Brown herself "remains the most eloquent piece of evidence in this case". She described how Brown's "body speaks volumes about the life she was forced to live." Dwimoh did this while projecting the images of Brown's corpse onto three large screens. Dwimoh further said that "Each mark, bruise, laceration, contusion, abrasion, ligature mark, tells the story of systematic abuse and torture that she suffered at the hands of this defendant" Schwartz continued to portray Rodriguez as a family man who punished Brown with beatings but insisted that Brown's mother was the actual killer.

The jury began deliberating on March 13. They had received instructions from Justice L. Priscilla Hall in deciding on the 12 criminal charges against Rodriguez. Schwartz had indicated that Rodriguez would be convicted of something. He made one last unsuccessful attempt at a mistrial, arguing that the prosecution shouldn't have used the photographs.

On March 18, Rodriguez was convicted of first-degree manslaughter. Rodriguez faced a maximum of 29 years for the manslaughter charge, weapons possession and endangering the welfare of a child.

On April 3, Brooklyn Supreme Court Justice L. Priscilla Hall, sentenced Cesar Rodriguez to a term of 26 1/3 to 29 years in prison. He was given 25 years for first-degree manslaughter and 1 1/3 to four years for false imprisonment. This sentence was the maximum term. Prior to the judge imposing her sentence, Rodriguez briefly addressed the court saying, "I'm just sorry for causing anybody any emotional pain or distorted memories about the child. I'm just sorry. I loved Nixzmary."

== Nixzaliz Santiago's trial ==
=== Before trial ===
Santiago was harassed by other inmates during a bus ride to the Brooklyn courthouse. She had complained to the judge about her treatment and other inmates. Her lawyer, Sammy Sanchez, told Brooklyn Supreme Court Justice Patricia DiMango that Santiago "was physically harassed", this at the first hearing since Rodriguez was convicted of manslaughter.

The jury selection began on September 15, 2008.

=== During trial ===
During the opening remarks, prosecutors revealed that Brown's last words as she lay dying were "Mommy, mommy, mommy". Prosecutor Ama Dwimoh stated that Santiago did not stop Rodriguez from "repeatedly beating" Brown. Dwimoh also said that Santiago "didn't protect", "didn't love" and "didn't nurture" Brown. Supreme Court Justice Patricia DiMango, who was allegedly emotional herself, allowed one juror, who was an elementary school teacher, to leave. Defense attorney Sammy Sanchez pleaded Santiago's case, arguing that she couldn't help herself because she, too, was battered by Cesar Rodriguez.

The trial was later brought to a halt by Justice DiMango amidst secret meeting accusations against a juror and a "possible mystery witness", prompted by a letter sent to a defense lawyer that DiMango had obtained. The author of the letter informed the Daily News that the teacher raised his hand to indicate he could not be fair. However the judge and the lawyers did not observe this action. Then the juror told the judge that he did not raise his hand. DiMango handled the most serious allegation by questioning the accused juror. DiMango then addressed the courtroom with these words: "If it comes to my attention that anyone here is attempting in any way to inappropriately influence these proceedings ... I take that extremely seriously, and will deal directly with that individual or individuals."

A neighbor named Ulbis Rivera later testified at Santiago's trial. Rivera had made a 911 call, shouting that "7-year-old is unconscious." Rivera indicated that Santiago appeared "calm" even though she made moaning sounds heard on the 911 call. Rivera indicated that Santiago told her that Brown had drowned. She was, however, still lying on the floor, dry and clothed. Rivera said that Santiago was "faking" remorse over Brown's death. Rivera cried on the witness stand as Dwimoh presented photographs of Brown to her.

Santiago's lawyer, Kathleen Mullin, argued during the trial that her client was guilty only of failing to realize that Brown was dying from Rodriguez's beatings. She urged the Brooklyn jury to convict Santiago of criminally negligent homicide, which would carry a maximum of four years in prison and continued to blame Rodriguez for the deadly blows. Prosecutors insisted that Santiago had to know of her husband's abuse and showed autopsy photographs to make their point.

Mullin continued in her defense of Santiago by saying that Brown was prevented from crying out because duct tape was used to seal her mouth, while Rodriguez was beating her. Mullin then held up a picture of Nixzmary's battered body and said "What he was doing was this." She used this in her closing argument, stating that Santiago had no idea that Rodriguez was beating Brown to her death. Mulin backed up her defense by using the physical evidence that the tape marks on Brown's face were fresh; that there was a "ball of rolled-up tape in the bathroom garbage pail"; that Santiago could not hear Brown crying out because of the duct tape and because the door to the back room was shut. Assistant D.A. Dwimoh argued against this defense saying that the girl was "unrecognizable" in death, then stated that "Someone in this courtroom had a duty to help, and that someone is Nixzaliz Santiago." Dwimoh said that while Brown was dying, Santiago was plotting her defense that Rodriguez was solely responsible.

=== Verdict and after trial ===
The jury deliberated for 18 hours over a three-day period, then found Nixzaliz Santiago guilty of manslaughter—the same verdict that Rodriguez had received. She was acquitted of the more serious charge of second-degree murder. However, because she was previously convicted of four lesser crimes against Nixzmary—assault for binding Brown with a bungee cord, blackening her eye, unlawful imprisonment and endangering her welfare—Santiago would face more time when sentenced on November 5, 2008. There was no reaction from Santiago when the verdict was read. The judge indicated that a protection order would prevent her from seeing her other children.

After the trial, D.A. Dwimoh stated, "Today was a good day for children because this jury said that parents have a duty—it's not just what you do but what you don't do ... Nixzmary, being a 7-year-old child, was owed a duty by her mother to protect her and give her medical attention."

Santiago was sentenced on November 12, 2008, to 43 years in prison. Justice Patricia DiMango made these harsh remarks to her: "You may not have delivered the fatal blow, but were it not for your failure to act, Nixzmary Brown would probably not have died from that blow," and "By your own statements, she gasped for air—moaning—and called for you twice until she died. You, Mrs. Santiago, ignored the desperate calls and left this little 7-year-old alone and you did nothing" and finally "You had a duty to act. You were the mother." Santiago's defense attorney Kathleen Mullin said she would appeal. On appeal, Santiago's sentence was reduced to 33 1/3 to 36 years.

== See also ==
Persons

- Murder of Elisa Izquierdo
- Murder of Nadine Lockwood
- Murder of Joseph Wallace
- Murder of Harmony Montgomery

Similar cases

- Murder of Anjelica Castillo
- Lisa Steinberg
- Murder of Nubia Barahona
