= Murder of Nadine Lockwood =

American 4-year old who was murdered

Nadine Lockwood
- Born: September 1991; Washington Heights, Manhattan, New York City, United States
- Died: August 31, 1996 (aged 4); Washington Heights, New York City
- Cause of death: Starvation
- Known for: Child homicide victim

Nadine Lockwood (September 1991 – August 31, 1996) was an American 4-year-old girl from New York City who was murdered in August 1996. Nadine was starved to death by her parents, Carla Lockwood and Leroy Dickerson, at Lockwood's apartment in Washington Heights, and both were convicted of second degree murder. Nadine's death was a significant contributing factor to the overhaul of the child protective services system in New York City.

== Murder ==
Nadine Lockwood lived with her mother, Carla Lockwood, in an apartment in the Washington Heights neighborhood of Manhattan in New York City, along with her six siblings. Lockwood was a drug addict and was known by child protective services, but no serious action had been brought against her. Nadine was systematically starved by her mother, who admitted to police that she had hated the little girl and specifically singled her out for abuse. Lockwood kept Nadine, whom she referred to as "it", in squalid conditions, locked in a room in a covered crib. When Nadine was found dead on August 31, 1996, less than a month before her fifth birthday, she was emaciated and weighed only 15 and a half pounds. Lockwood eventually pleaded guilty to second-degree murder and was sentenced to 15 years to life in prison.

Nadine's father, Leroy Dickerson, lived separately and was frequently an absentee father. Two of Dickerson's other children with Lockwood, both in their early teens, testified against him in court stating that he had been equally complicit in the abuse of Nadine. They also stated that they were encouraged to not tell anyone about the abuse, and were instructed to say Nadine was visiting a relative in the South. Dickerson was convicted of second-degree murder and sentenced to 25 years to life for "depraved indifference" towards Nadine's life.

== Media coverage ==
Nadine became known in New York-based tabloids such as the New York Daily News and The New York Post due to the circumstances surrounding her death. The press called her "the girl who was never loved" and followed the trials of both of her parents closely. Her story was also publicized because it greatly paralleled that of Elisa Izquierdo, who had been murdered by her mother nine months earlier; both girls had been singled out among their numerous siblings for abuse. Later, the case would also be compared to that of Nixzmary Brown, another child that was specifically targeted for abuse by a parent.

As in the Izquierdo case, investigation into Nadine's death revealed that many potential opportunities to intervene had been missed. The family had been known to city agencies since 1989, when neglect proceedings were initiated because one of Carla Lockwood's other children tested positive for cocaine at birth. The matter was dropped when Lockwood entered a drug treatment program. Nadine herself had tested positive for cocaine at birth, but again, a case against Lockwood was dismissed within six months. Neighbors allegedly called the Child Welfare Administration several times in regards to the abuse Nadine suffered at her mother's hands, but little was done to investigate. The mishandling of Nadine's case was one of the factors that prompted a major overhaul of New York City's child protective services and protocols for investigating abuse allegations.

== See also ==
- Murder of Nixzmary Brown
- Murder of Elisa Izquierdo
- Murder of Justina Morales
- Murder of Joseph Wallace
- Murder of Harmony Montgomery
