= Murder of Justina Morales =

American murder victim

Justina Morales
- Born: February 19, 1987; New York City, U.S.
- Died: December 31, 1995 (aged 8); New York City, U.S.

Justina Morales (February 19, 1987 – December 31, 1995) was an American girl from the Bedford-Stuyvesant section of Brooklyn, New York, who was killed at the age of eight years by her mother's boyfriend, Luis Santiago, on December 31, 1995. Her body was never found. The killing gained notoriety primarily through the New York City newspapers.

== Disappearance and killing of Justina Morales ==
Justina's disappearance had gone unnoticed for more than a year. Teachers and school officials failed to take note of her long absence. In February 1997, a relative informed the police that the girl had been missing and possibly had been killed. The subsequent investigation, similar to those in the deaths of Elisa Izquierdo and Nadine Lockwood about the same time, disclosed shortcomings of the New York City child-welfare system.

== 1997 trial ==
In 1997, the trial of Santiago revealed that he had abused the girl physically for several years and that he had beaten her to death when she had refused to take a bath for a party that night. Justina's mother, Denise Solero, who was Santiago's girlfriend, had likewise been abused by him.

Two years after the killing, Santiago was sentenced to a minimum of six and a maximum of nineteen years in prison. Solero had agreed to testify against Santiago in exchange for probation.

== Aftermath ==
It was reported in 1999 that Solero wanted to be reunited with another daughter. It was reported that Solero had changed her name to "Forbes" and was seeking supervised visits with her then two-year-old daughter, Sierra. Brooklyn Supreme Court Justice Joseph Bruno said there was no chance for a mother-daughter reunion that year, saying: "At this point, I see no basis to allow her to visit with any child, particularly her own child". Bruno further said: "It may be disappointing, but it should not be a surprise that this is my position."

== See also ==
- List of solved missing person cases: 1990s
- Murder of Joseph Wallace
