= New York State Department of Family Assistance =

The New York State Department of Family Assistance is a pro forma department of the New York state government that comprises two autonomous agencies:

- the New York State Office of Children and Family Services (OCFS)
- the New York State Office of Temporary and Disability Assistance (OTDA)
