= Rivera v. Bane =

1994 class action suit in New York

Rivera v Bane, Index No. 45305/92, was a class action lawsuit filed in 1994 before the New York State Supreme Court of New York County that established important precedents regarding the right of individuals to receive certain documents prior to a New York fair hearing. The case addressed procedural fairness in welfare administrative hearings and created enforceable standards for pre-hearing document disclosure that operated for sixteen years, from 1995 to 2011.

The lawsuit challenged the policies and practices of the New York City Human Resources Administration (HRA) regarding the timely provision of evidence packets and case records to appellants in fair hearing proceedings. The case resulted in multiple court orders, stipulations of settlement, and significant changes to New York State administrative procedures governing welfare fair hearings. It is where the term Rivera Request originates from.

== Background ==
=== Legal and Administrative Context ===
Fair hearings in New York State are administrative proceedings that provide individuals with the opportunity to challenge adverse decisions made by local social services agencies regarding public assistance benefits. These hearings are governed by Title 18 of the New York Codes, Rules and Regulations (NYCRR) Part 358, which establishes procedural requirements designed to ensure due process rights for benefit recipients.

Prior to Rivera v. Bane, individuals seeking to challenge HRA decisions in fair hearings faced significant obstacles in obtaining the documentary evidence necessary to prepare their cases. The lack of standardized procedures for document production created an imbalance between appellants and the agency, as HRA possessed all relevant case files while appellants often had limited access to the evidence that would be presented against them at the hearing.

The case arose during a period of increased scrutiny of welfare administration practices in New York City. The early 1990s saw numerous legal challenges to HRA policies and procedures, as advocacy organizations and legal aid groups sought to ensure that constitutional due process protections were meaningfully applied to administrative proceedings affecting low-income individuals and families.

=== Parties and Legal Representation ===
The case was brought as a class action on behalf of individuals who were appellants in HRA fair hearing proceedings. The defendant was Mary Jo Bane, who served as Commissioner of the New York State Department of Social Services at the time the case was filed. Commissioner Bane was responsible for overseeing the statewide fair hearing system, including the procedures governing document disclosure in administrative proceedings.

The plaintiffs were represented by legal aid attorneys who specialized in welfare law and administrative advocacy. The case was part of a broader litigation strategy aimed at reforming welfare administration practices and ensuring that procedural safeguards protected the rights of benefit recipients in administrative proceedings.

== Case History ==
=== Initial Filing and Early Proceedings ===
Rivera v. Bane was initially filed in 1992 and was subsequently refiled as a class action lawsuit in 1994. The case challenged HRA's failure to provide timely access to case records and evidence packets that would be used in fair hearing proceedings. The plaintiffs argued that this practice violated due process rights by preventing appellants from adequately preparing their cases and responding to the evidence presented by the agency.

The early proceedings in the case focused on establishing the scope of the class and defining the specific procedural violations that warranted judicial intervention. The court was required to balance the administrative efficiency concerns raised by HRA against the fundamental fairness principles that govern administrative hearings.

=== 1993 Court Ruling ===
An early ruling in the case was reported in the New York Law Journal on October 15, 1993. This decision addressed preliminary issues related to class certification and the scope of the relief sought by the plaintiffs. The court's analysis in this early ruling was later cited in academic literature as an example of innovative approaches to class action certification in cases involving government agencies.

The Fordham Urban Law Journal noted that the Rivera v. Bane court "referred to a possible fifth exception" for class certification in cases involving numerous government agencies or officials, each of which might not necessarily be bound by a judgment against the others. This legal theory represented an important development in class action jurisprudence as applied to government defendants.

=== December 1995 Judgment ===
Following trial proceedings, the court entered a judgment on December 22, 1995, that ordered significant changes to HRA's document disclosure practices. The judgment required HRA to make public assistance files available before fair hearings when timely requested by appellants or their representatives. This represented a major victory for welfare rights advocates and established enforceable standards for pre-hearing document production.

The 1995 judgment created specific timeframes within which HRA was required to respond to document requests. The court found that the agency's previous practices had violated the due process rights of fair hearing appellants by denying them meaningful access to the evidence that would be used in their cases.

== Implementation and Administrative Impact ==
=== Regulatory Changes ===
The Rivera v. Bane judgment necessitated significant changes to New York State administrative regulations governing fair hearing procedures. The case directly influenced amendments to 18 NYCRR sections 358-3.7(b) and 358-4.2(c) and (d), which govern the provision of documents in fair hearing proceedings.

These regulatory changes established standardized procedures for document requests and created enforceable deadlines for agency responses. The modifications were designed to ensure that the procedural protections established by the Rivera judgment would be consistently applied across all fair hearing proceedings involving HRA.

=== Creation of the Rivera Request ===
One of the most significant practical impacts of the case was the creation of the "Rivera request," also known as an evidence packet request. This became the standard form (labeled W-186A) used for requesting evidence relating to New York City Human Resources Administration fair hearings. The Rivera Request form was specifically designed to implement the court's requirements and provide a standardized mechanism for appellants to obtain necessary documentation.

The form included specific categories of documents that could be requested and established clear procedures for HRA to follow in responding to such requests. This systematization of the document request process represented a significant improvement in the accessibility and predictability of fair hearing procedures.

=== Office of Administrative Hearings Implementation ===
The implementation of the Rivera v. Bane requirements was overseen by the New York State Office of Administrative Hearings (OAH), which issued multiple memoranda to Administrative Law Judges (ALJs) regarding compliance with the court's orders. Henry Pedicone, OAH Associate Counsel, played a key role in developing and communicating the implementation procedures.

A July 2, 1997 memorandum from Pedicone to all New York City ALJs addressed specific issues related to Rivera v. Bane compliance and provided guidance on how hearing officers should handle cases where HRA failed to comply with document production requirements. The memorandum established procedures for ALJs to follow when agencies did not meet their obligations under the court order.

== 2005 Stipulation of Settlement ==
=== Negotiated Resolution ===
After years of implementation and ongoing compliance issues, the parties negotiated a comprehensive Stipulation of Settlement that was dated February 18, 2005, and "so ordered" by the court on February 22, 2005. This stipulation replaced the original 1995 judgment and established updated procedures that reflected the experience gained during the initial implementation period.

The 2005 stipulation was the result of extensive negotiations between the plaintiffs' attorneys and the New York City Law Department. According to the NYC Law Department's Annual Report for 2004/2005, attorney John Wing "negotiated the vacatur of an onerous permanent injunction regarding the production of documents in administrative law proceedings" as part of the settlement discussions.

=== Impact on Statewide Procedures ===
The 2005 stipulation had implications beyond New York City, as it influenced statewide administrative procedures. The New York State Office of Temporary and Disability Assistance (OTDA) issued Informational Letter 05-INF-23 in November 2005, explaining that "as a result of a Stipulation of Settlement in the Matter of Rivera v. Bane, dated February 18, 2005 and 'so ordered' on February 22, 2005, the requirement for NYC/HRA to provide the hearing packet and specifically identified documents within three days of a request ended."

This change required OTDA to modify multiple official forms and notices to reflect standardized timeframes for document provision across New York State. The revision process affected forms LDSS-4682, LDSS-4682 NYC, LDSS-4799, LDSS-4799 NYC, LDSS-4827, and LDSS-4827 NYC, demonstrating the broad administrative impact of the case.

=== Ongoing Compliance Monitoring ===
The 2005 stipulation included provisions for ongoing monitoring of HRA's compliance with document production requirements. OAH continued to issue periodic guidance to ALJs regarding the implementation of the settlement terms and the procedures to follow when compliance issues arose.

A March 23, 2005 memorandum from Henry Pedicone informed ALJs of the details of the so-ordered Stipulation of Settlement and explained the specific requirements that HRA was expected to meet in providing documents to fair hearing appellants. This guidance was essential for ensuring consistent application of the settlement terms across all fair hearing proceedings.

== Case Termination and Legacy ==
=== 2011 Discontinuance ===
The Rivera v. Bane case was formally concluded on January 10, 2011, when a Stipulation of Settlement and Discontinuance was signed by the parties. This final agreement stated that "the 2005 Stipulation has expired and has no effect whatsoever," thereby ending the specific requirements that had been imposed on HRA for sixteen years.

Henry Pedicone informed ALJs of this development in a March 17, 2011 memorandum, explaining that "the specific requirements set forth for HRA in the above-described 2005 Stipulation are no longer applicable." The discontinuance marked the end of an era in New York fair hearing practice, as the case had been a defining feature of the administrative landscape for nearly two decades.

=== Continuing Impact ===
Despite the formal conclusion of the case, its impact on fair hearing practice continued beyond 2011. The Safety Net Project noted in a 2020 report that "the Rivera v. Bane court order expired on March 9, 2011, but fair hearing appellants are still able to receive copies of their evidence packet upon request." This suggests that many of the procedural improvements established by the case became embedded in standard administrative practice.

The case also continued to be referenced in legal advocacy materials and practice guides for attorneys representing clients in fair hearing proceedings. The procedural frameworks and forms developed during the Rivera implementation period remained influential in shaping expectations about document disclosure in administrative proceedings.

== Legal Significance and Academic Analysis ==
=== Class Action Jurisprudence ===
Rivera v. Bane made an important contribution to the development of class action jurisprudence in cases involving government defendants. The case was cited in the Fordham Urban Law Journal as an example of courts exploring innovative theories for class certification when dealing with complex government structures involving multiple agencies or officials.

The court's analysis of class certification issues in Rivera was particularly significant because it addressed the challenge of ensuring that judgments against government entities would be effectively binding across different levels of administration. This legal theory influenced subsequent litigation strategies in cases involving government defendants.

=== Administrative Law Precedent ===
The case established important precedents in administrative law regarding the balance between agency efficiency and individual due process rights. The court's analysis demonstrated how constitutional due process principles could be meaningfully applied to administrative proceedings without unduly burdening government operations.

The Rivera decision influenced academic discussions about the right to counsel in administrative proceedings and the procedural safeguards necessary to ensure fair hearings in welfare cases. Legal scholars cited the case as an example of successful litigation that achieved practical improvements in administrative justice.

=== Impact on Welfare Law ===
Rivera v. Bane was part of a broader movement in welfare law during the 1990s that sought to ensure that procedural protections kept pace with the increasing complexity of benefit administration. The case demonstrated how strategic litigation could address systemic problems in welfare administration and create lasting improvements in the treatment of benefit recipients.

The case's focus on document disclosure reflected a broader understanding that meaningful participation in administrative proceedings required access to the information necessary to prepare an effective case. This principle influenced subsequent advocacy efforts and policy developments in welfare administration.

== Related Cases and Legal Context ==
=== Contemporary Litigation ===
Rivera v. Bane was filed during a period of intense litigation challenging various aspects of New York's welfare administration system. The case was contemporaneous with other significant lawsuits, including Varshavsky v. Perales, which addressed fair hearing access rights for individuals who could not travel to centralized hearing locations.

These cases collectively represented a comprehensive challenge to administrative practices that advocates argued violated the due process rights of welfare recipients. The litigation strategy involved coordinated efforts to address different aspects of the fair hearing system, from document access to physical accessibility.

=== Relationship to Federal Law ===
The case operated within the framework of federal constitutional due process requirements as applied to state administrative proceedings. The court's analysis drew upon established precedents regarding the procedural protections required in administrative hearings that could result in the termination or reduction of government benefits.

The Rivera decision reflected the application of principles established in landmark cases such as Goldberg v. Kelly, which recognized that welfare benefits constitute property interests protected by the Due Process Clause of the Fourteenth Amendment. The case demonstrated how these constitutional principles could be translated into specific procedural requirements in state administrative systems.

== See also ==
• Welfare Management System

• Rivera request

• New York State Office of Temporary and Disability Assistance

• Administrative law

• Due process

• Class action
