= Welfare Reform Act of 1997 =

1997 New York State welfare reform law

New York State Legislature
- Long title: An act in relation to enacting the "Welfare Reform Act of 1997" and amending the social services law and other laws relating to public assistance
- Citation: Laws of New York, 1997, ch. 436
- Territorial extent: State of New York
- Enacted: August 20, 1997
- Commenced: November 1, 1997
- Status: Amended

The Welfare Reform Act of 1997 is a New York State statute that restructured the state's public assistance system following the enactment of the federal Personal Responsibility and Work Opportunity Reconciliation Act of 1996 (PRWORA). Enacted as chapter 436 of the Laws of 1997, the Act renamed the state Department of Social Services as the Department of Family Assistance and created two autonomous offices within it: the Office of Temporary and Disability Assistance (OTDA) and the Office of Children and Family Services (OCFS). It also replaced the former Aid to Families with Dependent Children (AFDC) and Home Relief programs with two new programs, Family Assistance (FA) and Safety Net Assistance (SNA).

The statute was signed into law by Governor George Pataki on August 20, 1997, with most public-assistance and work-requirement provisions taking effect on November 1, 1997. The Act aligned New York's welfare policies with federal TANF requirements—including time limits and work participation standards—while preserving a state-funded "safety net" in order to comply with Article XVII of the Constitution of New York, which obliges the state to provide aid to needy residents.

== Background ==
=== Federal welfare reform ===
In August 1996, the United States Congress enacted PRWORA, which replaced AFDC with TANF, converted federal welfare funding into fixed block grants to the states, and imposed a 60-month lifetime limit on federally funded cash assistance, along with stricter work requirements for adult recipients. The federal law also curtailed eligibility for many categories of non-citizens and gave states broad discretion to design welfare-to-work programs and sanction policies.

=== New York State context ===
Before 1997, New York administered cash assistance primarily through AFDC for families with children and Home Relief for childless adults and certain other individuals, both overseen by the state Department of Social Services. New York's approach to welfare reform was shaped by Article XVII of the state constitution, which requires the state to provide for the "aid, care and support of the needy." Unlike many other states, New York maintained a state- and locally funded general assistance program and was required to ensure that families whose TANF eligibility ended could still receive some form of public assistance.

New York's response to PRWORA was enacted as the Welfare Reform Act of 1997 (sometimes abbreviated in legal and academic literature as NYRA), which restructured the state's public assistance programs and related administrative agencies to conform to the new federal framework.

== Provisions ==
=== Administrative restructuring ===
The Welfare Reform Act of 1997 abolished the state's Department of Social Services and replaced it with the Department of Family Assistance. Within the new department, the Act created two autonomous offices: OTDA and OCFS. OTDA was given responsibility for cash public assistance, food assistance, and other income-support and housing programs, while OCFS assumed responsibility for child welfare, youth services, juvenile justice facilities, and certain childcare functions that had previously been housed in the Department of Social Services.

The Act also transferred some functions of the former Department of Social Services to the Department of Health and the Department of Labor, reflecting the increased emphasis on work participation and the integration of welfare policy with labor-market and health-care programs.

=== Public assistance programs ===
At the program level, the Act replaced AFDC and Home Relief with two main categories of cash assistance: Family Assistance (FA) and Safety Net Assistance (SNA). FA is funded with federal TANF dollars and generally serves households with children, while SNA is financed by the state and localities and serves households without children and families that are ineligible for FA.

Under this structure, qualified families can receive up to 60 months of TANF-funded assistance over their lifetime, consistent with federal law. The Act also created a separate, more restrictive SNA program for individuals and families who had exhausted their TANF eligibility or were otherwise ineligible for federally funded assistance, thereby preserving some level of support in line with the state constitution's guarantee of aid to the needy.

The statute and related implementing plans contemplated a shift from cash to more "non-cash" forms of assistance for certain long-term recipients, under which benefits would be provided largely through vendor payments and an electronic benefits transfer (EBT) system rather than as unrestricted cash. A proposed plan to convert some SNA benefits to a non-cash, EBT-based system—under which rent and utilities would be paid directly to landlords and service providers—was later withdrawn following concerns raised by the state comptroller and by advocates regarding access and implementation.

=== Time limits and work requirements ===
New York's Welfare Reform Act incorporated federal TANF requirements for a 60-month lifetime limit on federally funded assistance, adult work-participation obligations, and residency and schooling requirements for teenage parents. The law also added a two-year limit for certain state-funded SNA benefits; months in which a family receives SNA can count toward the federal 60-month TANF limit.

The Act required most able-bodied adults receiving public assistance to engage in work or work-related activities after a relatively short period on the rolls, with limited exemptions for people with serious disabilities or parents caring for very young children. Local social services districts, including New York City's Human Resources Administration and county departments of social services, were given substantial discretion in designing and administering workfare and welfare-to-work programs consistent with state and federal rules.

=== Family Violence Option and other protections ===
As part of the implementation of PRWORA, New York adopted the federal Family Violence Option, allowing welfare agencies to screen for domestic violence and to waive certain work requirements and time limits for victims when necessary to protect their safety. County-level guidance describes the Family Violence Option as enabling staff to address the safety needs of domestic violence victims and, where appropriate, to grant waivers from work obligations or other program requirements.

The Act and its implementing regulations also addressed issues such as substance abuse treatment for recipients with drug or alcohol dependency, coordination with child welfare and child support enforcement systems, and the use of sanctions for non-compliance with program rules.

== Implementation and impact ==
Following the federal and state reforms, New York's welfare caseload declined sharply in the late 1990s and early 2000s, a trend attributed to a combination of economic growth and changes in state and local welfare policies. In New York City, the number of people receiving public assistance fell by more than half between 1995 and 2001, even as demand for emergency food and homeless services increased and many former recipients moved into low-wage, unstable employment.

Advocacy groups and scholars have noted that the Welfare Reform Act of 1997, when combined with local welfare-to-work policies and child protection practices, had complex effects on low-income families and children. Analyses by organizations such as the Citizens' Committee for Children of New York and the New York City Bar Association have highlighted persistent child poverty, barriers to accessing food and medical assistance, and rising family homelessness despite reduced cash-assistance caseloads. Legal scholarship has also argued that the interaction between the state's welfare rules and the child welfare system can place children in precarious situations, particularly when benefit terminations or sanctions contribute to conditions that are later treated as neglect.

Certain provisions of the Act, particularly those dealing with income and resource exemptions and state-funded safety-net benefits, have been periodically extended or amended by subsequent legislation, but the basic structure of Family Assistance, Safety Net Assistance, and the Department of Family Assistance's two major offices has remained in place.

== See also ==
- Personal Responsibility and Work Opportunity Reconciliation Act of 1996
- Temporary Assistance for Needy Families
- New York State Office of Temporary and Disability Assistance
- New York State Office of Children and Family Services
- Welfare in the United States

== General references ==
- "The Welfare Reform Act of 1997". Laws of New York. 220th sess.: III: 2806–2961. 1997. hdl:2027/nyp.33433017532999. ISSN 0892-287X. Chapter 436, enacted 20 August 1997.
