= Empty Beds, Wasted Dollars =

Empty Beds, Wasted Dollars was the strategic communications and advocacy strategy developed and executed by Edward Borges, to support New York State Office of Children and Family Services Commissioner Gladys Carrion's transformation of New York's juvenile justice system from a failed, punitive, correctional model to an evidence-based program to improve outcomes for children and make communities safer, despite formidable opposition from Upstate Republican legislators in whose districts the majority of juvenile jails were located, and the employees who worked in these facilities.

Empty Beds, Wasted Dollars campaign generated more than 300 newspaper, magazine, television, radio and online story and op-ed placements and 30 editorials in fewer than three years. It is widely-credited with creating the political capital needed to close more than half the state's juvenile jails, where children in custody had been maltreated by state employees, and where an emotionally disturbed 15-year-old boy was killed in 2006, when two state workers sat on him until he stopped breathing. The success of this campaign provided Carrión the clout to advance reform of the state's child welfare and child care systems, and improve overall child well-being across New York.
