= Murder of Zymere Perkins =

2016 child murder

- Date: September 29, 2016
- Location: Harlem, New York, U.S.
- Type: Child abuse, child neglect, torture
- Deaths: Zymere Perkins
- Burial: Rosedale and Rosehill Cemetery, Linden, New Jersey
- Convicted: Rysheim Smith; Geraldine Perkins
- Charges: Second-degree murder, first- and second-degree manslaughter, and endangering the welfare of a child (Smith); Second-degree manslaughter (Perkins)
- Sentence: Twenty-five years to life imprisonment (Smith); Two to six years imprisonment (Perkins)

Zymere Perkins (June 21, 2010 – September 29, 2016) was a six-year-old boy from Harlem who was abused, starved and ultimately fatally beaten on September 29, 2016. His mother, Geraldine Perkins, and her boyfriend, Rysheim Smith, were both charged in connection with his death. Geraldine Perkins pled guilty to second-degree manslaughter and was sentenced to two to six years in prison. After trial, Rysheim Smith was convicted on all charges against him including second-degree murder and first-degree manslaughter and sentenced to 25 years to life in prison.

In the months and years leading up to Perkins' death, multiple sources reported signs of abuse to the New York City Administration for Children's Services (ACS). However, Perkins was never removed from the household. This led to a state censure of ACS, the firing of several employees and the resignation of its Commissioner, Gladys Carrion.

== Background ==
Zymere Perkins was born on June 21, 2010, in New York City to Geraldine Perkins. Both mother and child allegedly tested positive for marijuana at the time of the birth but an ACS investigation was unable to substantiate those allegations. Perkins claimed to have lost contact with Zymere's father after the birth. At the time of the birth, Perkins, who had just graduated from high school, was living with her grandmother who had raised her. Seven months later, however, Perkins' grandmother accused her of having an affair with her husband and kicked her and the baby out of the home.

Perkins would later testify that she spent the next few years homeless, making money via prostitution and moving with Zymere between homeless shelters. She testified that, at one point, she falsely claimed to have a crack addiction in order to be admitted into a facility for people with substance abuse issues. Perkins admitted that, while at the drug treatment facility, she beat Zymere with a belt instead of her hands because she suffered from lupus. According to Perkins, shelter staff witnessed her belting her son and merely warned her that she would be reported if she was caught doing so again.

In May 2015, Perkins met Rysheim Smith, who was twice her age, when he asked for her phone number on the sidewalk outside her shelter. They began dating shortly thereafter. Smith had already begun abusing Zymere by the time Perkins and her son moved into the Harlem apartment in which Smith was illegally squatting later that summer.

After moving in, Zymere began experiencing issues with bedwetting and fecal incontinence according to testimony from his mother. Perkins admitted that she and Smith would punish Zymere for his incontinence by starving him, depriving him of sleep and beating him with sticks among other methods.

- On June 30, Smith reportedly beat Zymere with a belt as punishment for drawing on an apartment wall with a crayon. According to the report received by ACS, Zymere's screams were loud enough to be heard on the sidewalk below. Although Zymere told investigators that Smith punished him by belting him and forcing him to take cold showers, ACS did not seek court intervention and merely offered Perkins parenting services which she declined.
- On August 28, 2015, a neighbor reported that he found Zymere wandering alone after Perkins and Smith left Zymere home unattended. The same neighbor reported to ACS that he had a physical altercation with Perkins and Smith in front of Zymere only a few days later. During their investigation, ACS observed injuries on Zymere who reiterated that he was being beaten and forced into cold showers. Again, however, the agency took no action.
- On February 2, 2016, Zymere's school alerted ACS to the several injuries they had noticed Zymere had suffered that school year, including an apparently broken jaw, scratches to his face and an apparently knocked-out tooth. During the agency's investigation, Zymere and his mother's explanation of the injuries contradicted each other; Zymere claimed to have fallen in the snow while mother said he had clumsily suffered a scooter accident. ACS again took no action.
- On April 18, 2016, Zymere's school again alerted ACS to suspicious injuries. ACS and the New York City Police Department investigated the report but assessed that Zymere was not at imminent risk of harm and sought no further recourse.

Perkins would testify that, on July 4, 2015, Zymere uprooted a family member's plants during a barbecue. Smith punished Perkins by denying him food, forcing him to hold a push-up position, hitting him with a stick, punching and kicking him. According to Perkins, the abuse continued for hours as she and Smith forced the child to stand in the corner of the apartment for the entirety of that night.

In October 2015, Perkins received a report from Zymere's school that he had asked another student to show him his penis. According to Perkins' testimony, Smith punished the child by punching him in the face, knocking out several of his teeth. Per Perkins, Smith told Zymere to lie about the cause of his injury.

According to Perkins' great-aunt, Perkins called her three weeks before Zymere's death and said that she was afraid that Smith was "going to hurt" her or Zymere. Perkins' family told The New York Times that Zymere had not returned to school for the start of the 2016–17 school year.

Zymere was buried on October 8, 2016, in a private ceremony at Rosedale and Rosehill Cemetery in Linden, New Jersey.
