= New York State Office of Temporary and Disability Assistance =

State agency

The New York State Office of Temporary and Disability Assistance (OTDA) is an agency of the New York state government. OTDA has wide-ranging responsibilities for the provision of income support, nutrition, energy, housing, and disability-related assistance to low-income individuals and families. The office has its headquarters in Albany. Along with the Office of Children and Family Services it is part of the pro forma Department of Family Assistance.

The agency is responsible for programs and services involving cash assistance, including the state's Temporary Assistance for Needy Families (TANF) program and a state- and locally funded program for households ineligible for federal aid; the Supplemental Nutrition Assistance Program (SNAP); home energy assistance; child support enforcement; and the state supplementation program supplementing federal Supplemental Security Income. OTDA also makes the medical eligibility determinations for federal disability claims filed in New York. Additionally, the agency oversees homeless housing and services and administers refugee resettlement assistance.

Most OTDA programs are state-supervised but locally administered, delivered through the local social services districts comprising New York City and the counties. The agency establishes regulations and policy for the districts, monitors their operations, and conducts the administrative fair hearings at which applicants and recipients may challenge local determinations.

== Administration ==
The New York (state) Welfare Management System receives, maintains and processes information relating to persons who apply for benefits, or who are determined to be eligible for benefits under any program administered by the department.

Administrative reviews ("Fair Hearings") of decisions by a local social services agency are handled by the OTDA Office of Administrative Hearings. A Rivera request, also known as an evidence packet request, is the document (labeled W-186A) used for requesting evidence relating to a NYC Human Resources Administration fair hearing pursuant to the stipulation and settlement in Rivera v. Bane.

== History ==
In 1867 a Board of State Commissioners of Public Charities was created to visit and examine into the affairs of all charitable institutions. In 1894 a constitutional convention enacted a provision requiring the Legislature to establish a State Board of Charities to visit and inspect all institutions. In 1909 the Poor Law was consolidated in chapter 42, and the State Charities Law in chapter 55, of the Consolidated Laws of New York. The Public Welfare Law superseded the Poor Law in 1929. In 1931 they were renamed as the Department of Social Welfare and the State Board of Social Welfare. In 1940 the State Charities Law and the Public Welfare Law were consolidated and clarified in one Social Welfare Law. In 1967 it was renamed as the Department of Social Services.

The state implemented Medicaid in 1966 and designated the department as the "single state agency", but required it to contract with the state Department of Health. The Social Services Department and local social districts were responsible for eligibility determinations and paying claims, while the Health Department and local health districts were responsible for settings standards (including fees schedules) and supervising and surveilling providers.

On August 20, 1997, Governor Pataki signed the Welfare Reform Act of 1997 that, in relevant part, renamed it as the Department of Family Assistance, and also divided the department into Office of Temporary and Disability Assistance (OTDA) and the State Office of Children and Family Services (OCFS). These two offices assumed many of DSS' functions. Other functions of the former DSS were transferred to the Department of Labor and the Department of Health.

== See also ==
- New York City Human Resources Administration
