= Parker Training Academy Dutch Barn =

- U.S. National Register of Historic Places
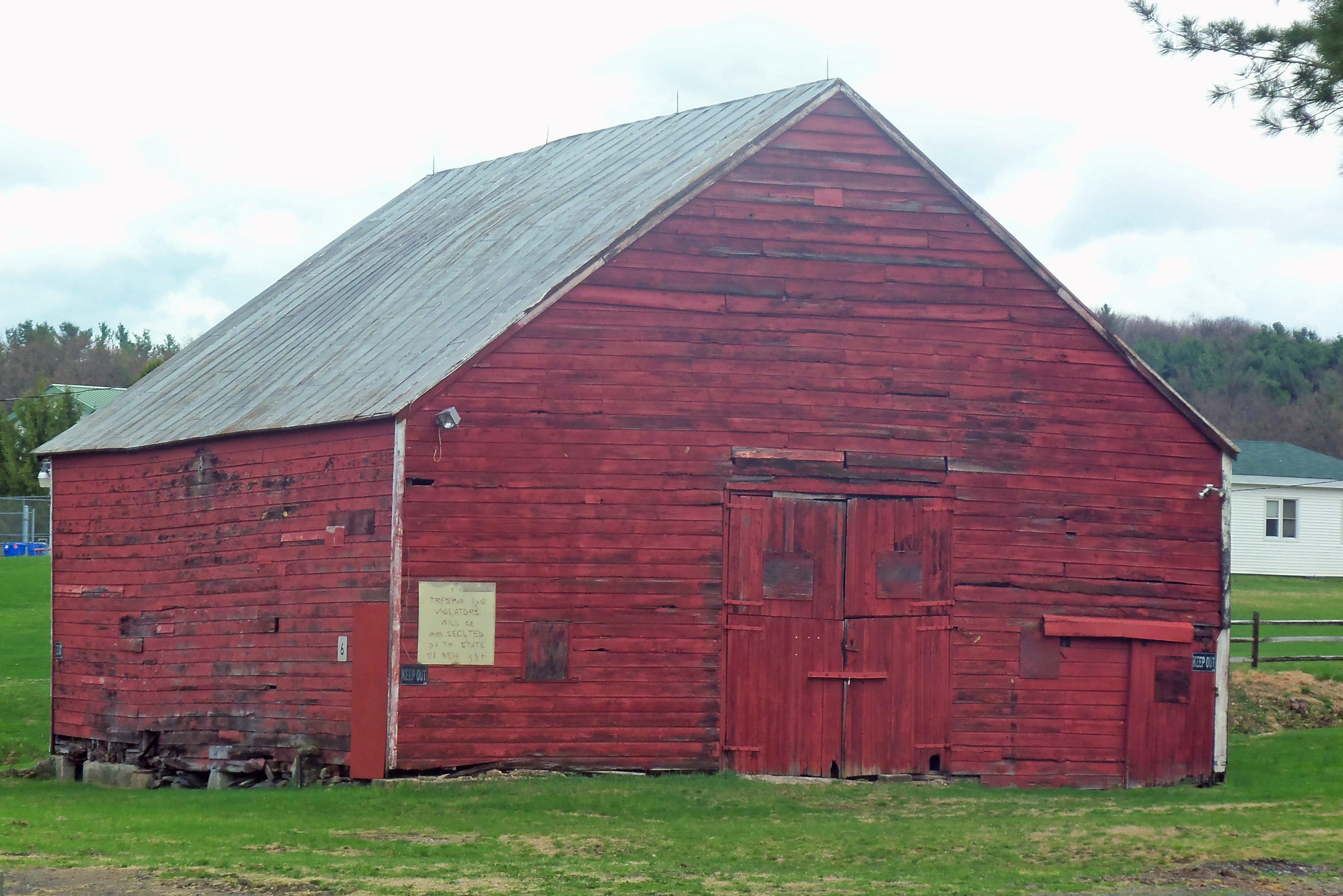
- West profile and south elevation, 2013

- Location within New York Location within the United States
- Location: Red Hook, NY
- Nearest city: Kingston, NY
- Coordinates: 42°1′5″N 73°49′3″W
- Area: less than one acre
- Built: 1790
- NRHP reference No.: 07001035
- Added to NRHP: October 3, 2007

The Parker Training Academy Dutch Barn is located at that institution on Turkey Hill Road in the town of Red Hook, New York, United States. It is a wooden structure built in two stages between 1790 and 1810. In 2007 it was listed on the National Register of Historic Places.

It is one of the last New World Dutch barns built in the Hudson Valley; by the time of its construction that building type had mostly been displaced by newer barn designs. It was extended northwards by a bay within 20 years of its construction. While it has been possible to determine this information, the original builder remains unknown. Since the mid-20th century the building has been on the campus of Parker Training Academy, part of the New York State Office of Children and Family Services (OCFS).

== Building ==
The barn is located at the academy grounds on the north side of Turkey Hill Road (Dutchess County Route 56), in the eastern portion of the town, roughly one quarter-mile (400 m) from the boundary with the neighboring town of Milan), an area known as Cokertown. Terrain is gently rolling, with wetlands amid low hills, as the Hudson River valley begins to yield to the Taconic Mountains. Lakes Kill, a tributary of the Saw Kill, flows south to the west, just below its source at Spring Lake. Warackamac Lake is to the southwest on the town line. The area is rural in character, with a mix of cleared areas for farms, houses on large lots and woodlands.

=== Exterior ===
The building itself is on the east side of the academy's driveway, which runs north from Turkey Hill, about 150 feet (46 m) from the road. To its west the driveway widens to include parking spaces on either side; the buildings of the rest of the academy complex are to the north. A side road south of the barn climbs gently up a hill to the academy's watersphere on a nearby wooded ridge at the town line. Northeast of the barn is a small retention pond, which drains to Lakes Kill, partially fenced off on the north and west, with a large mowed lawn beyond between it and the nearest building.

Like all New World Dutch barns, the Parker Academy barn is a three-by-four-bay (30-by-42-foot (9.1 by 12.8 m)) wooden frame structure standing on a stone foundation sided in clapboard and topped by a front-gabled roof sheathed in standing-seam metal roofing nailed to the original wooden shingles. At each corner are plain cornerboards. The roof eaves slightly overhang the east and west sides but are flush on the others, with a plain fascia below. Several lightning rods are along the roof crest.

The south (front) facade has 12-foot-high (3.7 m) double Dutch doors of vertical battens with cast iron strap hinges, four per section, in the center. In the middle of the upper section of both is a six-light square window, covered over for security purposes. There is evidence of a pentice having been located above the entrance in the past, and a dovecote having been in the gable apex.

To the east of the main entrance is a sliding wooden door, also made of vertical battens. Two large signs warning against unauthorized entrance to the barn are conspicuously displayed near the building's corners. Security is complemented by two modern floodlights at the roofline.

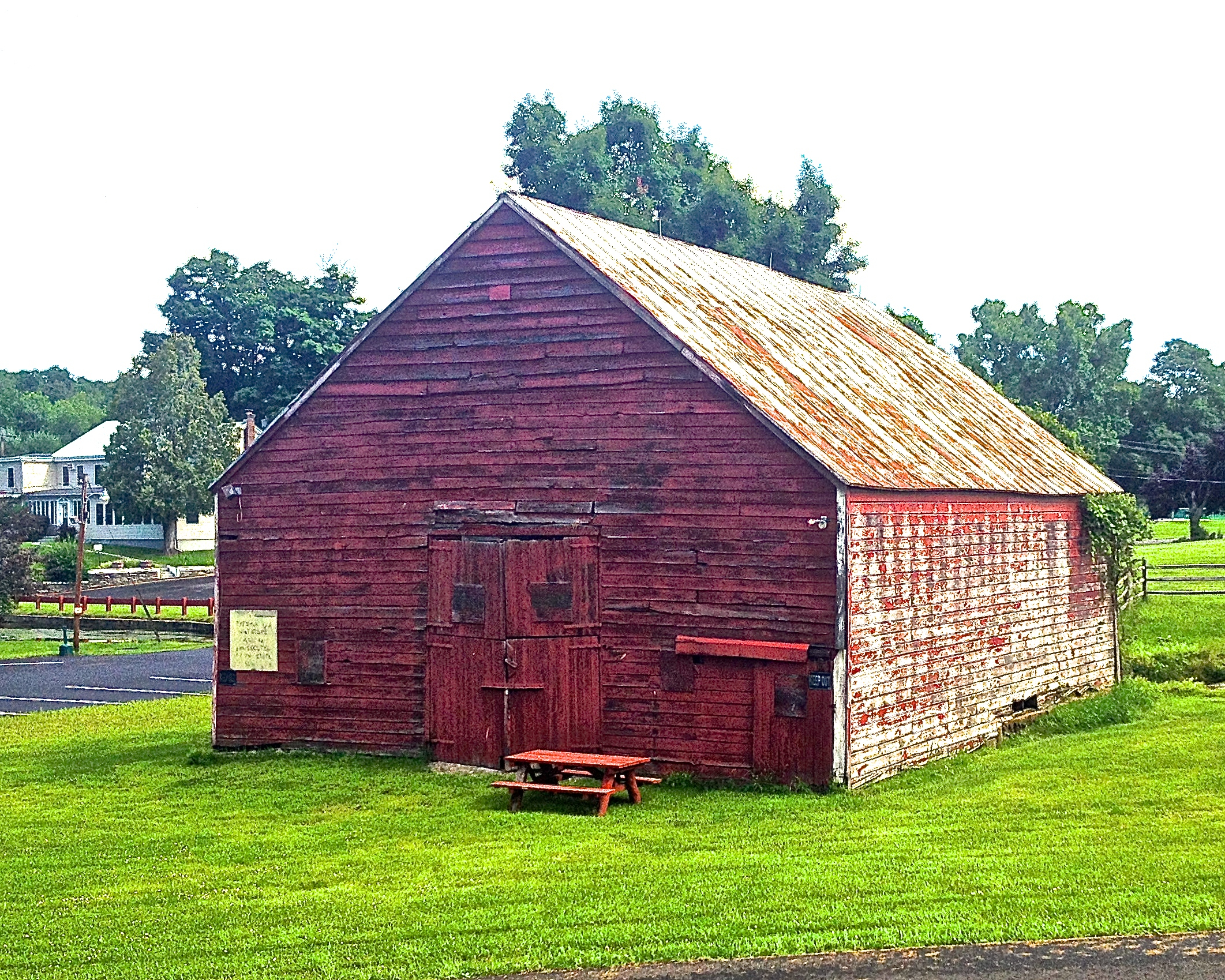
View showing east profile, 2014

With the exception of one former door in the southwest corner, now boarded over, the east and west sides of the barn have no fenestration. A sign with the number "6" assigned to the barn by the academy for management purposes, is next to it. Near the north end of the west side, structural deterioration has exposed the foundation slightly, and some modern concrete blocks used to shore it up are visible. Some deterioration, and missing clapboards, are visible on the east side. The north (rear) elevation has a similar double Dutch wagon door with a modern poured concrete ramp due to the doors' slight height above grade.

=== Interior ===
Inside, the barn's distinct structural system is visible. Five bents support the roof and walls; the two on the north and south ends support the studwork for the clapboard siding and entrance framing. They are braced twice: at the intersection of the post and tie beams, and again above the tie beam. Both upper and lower ties are connected to the anchor beams by mortise joints and pegs. A purlin-plate runs across the top of the bents, also mortised and braced. Below the tie beams another set of longitudinal braces links the bents, parallel to the purlin-plates.

Thick tongue and groove boards provide the threshing floor in the barn's center aisle. A raised wood platform, its floor level with the longitudinal braces, has been added to the east aisle. Below it is a concrete trough, and there is a small enclosure in the northwest section over the exposed, deteriorated section of the foundation.

Two sets of struts between the outer wall and the inner bents serve to delineate the side aisles. The outer walls are supported by braced uprights, and their plate in turn supports the rafters, which run continuously from there to the apex, staggered from the corresponding uprights. Above the rafters are the roof boards to which the original shingles and modern standing-seam metal is nailed. Most of the rafters are rough-hewn, lapped and pegged together at the apex; the newer ones in the northern quarter are only butted and nailed together there.

== History ==
Adapted from Dutch building traditions, the New World Dutch barn was common on many farms established by settlers from that country in the Hudson, Mohawk and Schoharie valleys during the late 17th and early 18th centuries. Many of the Palatine Germans who settled the area around Red Hook, in northwestern Dutchess and southwestern Columbia counties, adopted it as well. Those that remain are primarily in the Hudson Valley, but some examples persist as far south as New Jersey and as far north as Canada.

The Dutch barn design reflects a pre-industrial era of agriculture. They were used by farmers whose main product was grain, primarily wheat, with a central threshing floor and side aisles to serve as small granaries. The bent framing system is its most distinctively Dutch aspect, in direct contrast to the more box-like approach to framing preferred by builders working from English traditions, which began to predominate in the region over the later 18th century. This lent them their distinctive one-and-a-half-story front-gabled appearance. Later, when farmers began to expand into dairy and other products requiring more complex techniques, the early Dutch barns were often expanded along English lines, their framing subsumed into larger buildings and their large front entrances replaced by smaller side doors.

Several features of the Parker Academy barn suggest that its construction took place much later than that initial wave, in the 1790s rather than the early decades of that century as is the case with many of the other extant Dutch barns. The tie beam lacks the projecting tenon found in earlier Dutch barns. On the exterior, the large wagon doors are on both north and south faces, which may reflect the expansion of the barn around 1810. Both the initial construction of the barn and its expansion at such late dates go against the contemporary trend towards English-style barns.

While it has been easy for architectural experts to determine these dates, it has not been as easy to find the name of the farmer who might have done the work. Property records for the area from before the mid-19th century are very limited, and a Teator family described as owning the land in 1876 cannot be conclusively matched with Teators listed as living in Red Hook by the 1820 census. Another family, by the name of Sommers, has also been mentioned as a landowner.

By 1951 it was in the hands of Delia Howard and Josephine Clarke. They sold the property that year to the state agency that has since evolved into the New York State Office of Children and Family Services (OCFS). It was first run as a residential facility for those the agency served; today it is where its employees from around the state are trained to work in its facilities. It continues to preserve the barn and use it for some storage purposes.

== See also ==
- National Register of Historic Places listings in Dutchess County, New York
