= New York (state) Welfare Management System =

Section 21 of the New York State Social Services Law requires the New York State Department of Social Services to design and implement a Welfare Management System (WMS) capable of receiving, maintaining and processing information relating to persons who apply for benefits, or who are determined to be eligible for benefits under any program administered by the Department." Among its purposes are "promoting efficiency in local district determinations of eligibility for public assistance and care", "to expedite such determinations", and "to reduce unauthorized or excessive payments".

== See also ==
- New York State Office of Temporary and Disability Assistance
