= New York State Office of Children and Family Services =

State agency

Office of Children and Family Services
- State flag of New York

Office overview
- Jurisdiction: New York
- Office executive: Dr. DaMia Harris-Madden, Commissioner of Children and Family Services
- Key document: Social Services Law
- Website: ocfs.ny.gov

The New York State Office of Children and Family Services (OCFS) is an agency of the New York state government. OCFS has wide-ranging responsibilities for the provision of services to children, youth, families, and vulnerable adults.

The agency is responsible for programs and services involving child protective services, including operating the Statewide Central Register of Child Abuse and Maltreatment; preventive services for children and families; foster care, adoption, and adoption assistance; juvenile justice programs, administering and managing residential facilities located across New York State for youth remanded to the agency's custody by family and criminal courts; and child care and referral programs. Additionally, OCFS is responsible for protective programs for vulnerable adults. The agency also supports and monitors detention, aftercare, and a range of community-based programs. OCFS also coordinates, in part, the state government response to the needs of Native Americans and their children on reservations and in communities.

Prevention and rehabilitation efforts are joint ventures with local and county government, supported by federal, state, county, and municipal funds, as well as private contributions. OCFS provides technical and financial assistance to agencies involved in community youth programs and monitors activities of voluntary child-care and detention agencies in New York State.

The office has its headquarters in the Capital View Office Park in Rensselaer. Along with the Office of Temporary and Disability Assistance it is part of the pro forma Department of Family Assistance.

== Foster care ==
OCFS sets policy and standards for New York's foster care system, administered locally by social services districts (LDSSs: counties and NYC) and voluntary authorized agencies (VAs). OCFS licenses, inspects, and supervises residential facilities caring for dependent, neglected, abused, maltreated, abandoned, or delinquent children, and issues the operating certificates such facilities require. Placements must be in the least restrictive, most home-like setting appropriate to the child, and children under 10 may not ordinarily be placed in group homes or group residences without OCFS approval. A central component of the system is permanency planning, under which districts and agencies are required to make and document diligent efforts toward achieving a permanent placement outcome for children from the temporary status of foster care.

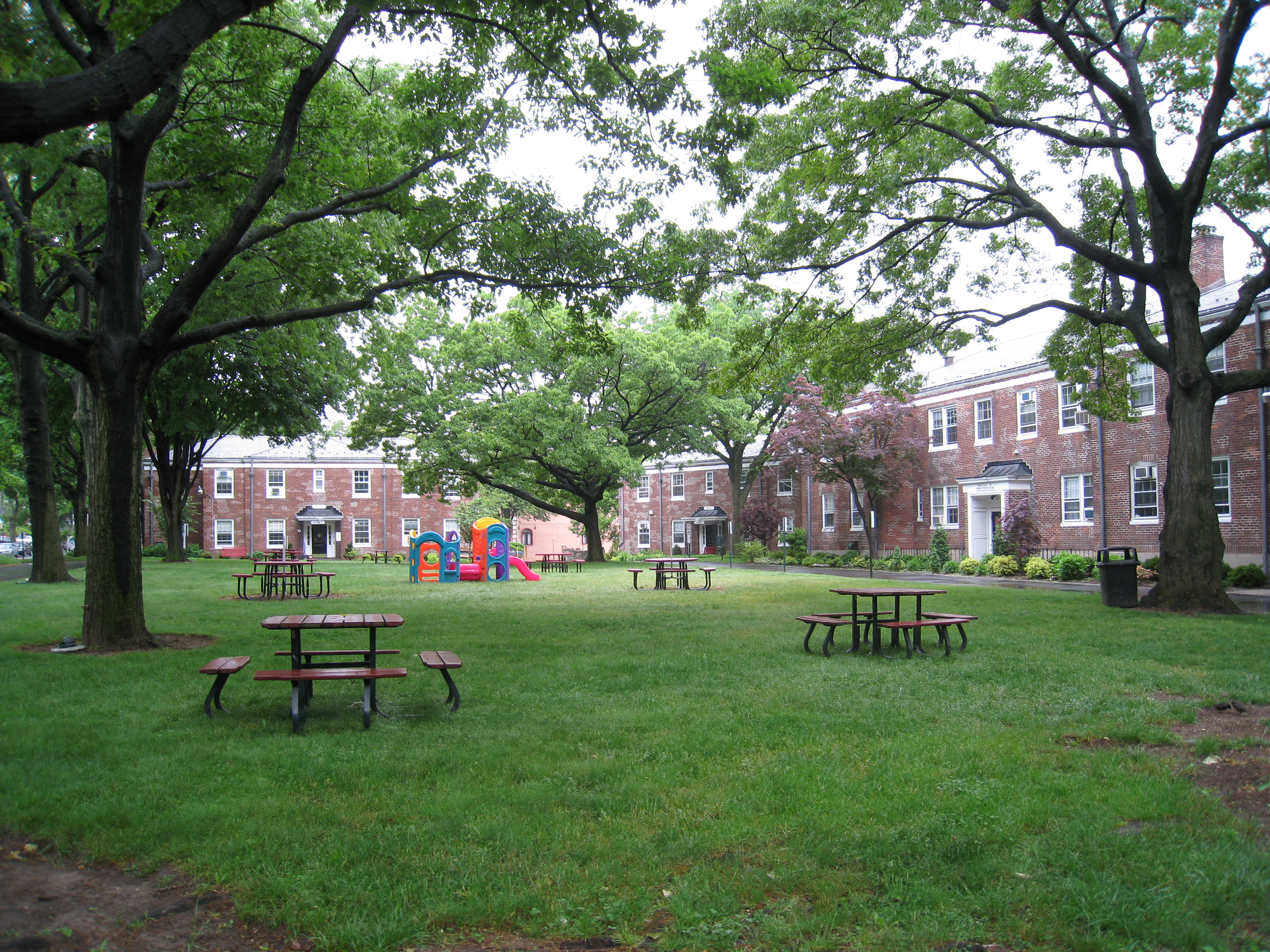
Forestdale is a voluntary authorized agency that certifies or approves boarding homes, including those of therapeutic foster parents. Their campus hosts family visits, not homes.

Under the federal child and family services review (CFSR) system, stable placement and stability in their living situations are part of the first permanency outcome. The continuity of family relationships and connections is the other permanency outcome; frequent, high-quality family time helps maintain relationships, improve adjustment, and support lasting reunification.

There are several different types of child-care agencies and institutions. A foster family boarding home (a boarding home) is a certified or approved home run by one person or family for up to 6 children (up to 8 with the sibling or adoption exception), including designated emergency foster family boarding homes. An approved home is a relative's foster home approved by letter of approval, and includes approved emergency relative foster homes. An institution is a facility operated by a child-care agency for 13 or more children, and a group residence is an institution of no more than 25 children. A group home is an agency-controlled family-type home for 7 to 12 children aged 5 or older, sitting between an agency boarding home (6 or fewer) and an institution (13 or more). An agency boarding home is a family-type home run by an authorized agency on premises it controls, for up to 6 children, with an exception allowing more than 6 siblings from the same family. A therapeutic foster parent has specialized training for children with significant behavioral, emotional, physical, or health needs.

OCFS implements these requirements through administrative directives (ADMs), Family Assessment and Service Plan (FASP) procedures, and the CONNECTIONS case-management system. The agency also establishes statewide requirements for caseworker contacts, visitation planning, permanency hearings coordination, and transition planning for older youth.

== Juvenile justice ==
OCFS operates the state's secure, limited secure, and non-secure residential facilities for youth placed with it by the Family Court or committed to it by the criminal courts, along with programs for youth after release. Pretrial detention facilities are operated by counties and certified and inspected by OCFS. Under the Close to Home initiative, juvenile delinquents in New York City placed in non-secure and limited secure settings are in the custody of the city's Administration for Children's Services (ACS) rather than OCFS.

A juvenile delinquent is generally a 12- to 17-year-old who committed an act that would be a crime if done by an adult; a juvenile offender is a 13-year-old charged with second-degree murder, or a 14- or 15-year-old charged with enumerated violent or sexual felonies; and an adolescent offender is a 16- or 17-year-old charged with a felony.

A secure facility is a locked residential facility; a limited secure facility is an intermediate level (in New York City, an institution, group residence, group home or agency boarding home); and a non-secure facility is the least restrictive level. Detained adolescent offenders must be held in a specialized secure juvenile detention facility for older youth, regulated, certified, and inspected by OCFS jointly with the State Commission of Correction.

== Child care ==
OCFS regulates child day care centers, group family day care homes, family day care homes, and school-age child care programs through licensing, registration, inspections, and enforcement. Child day care centers in New York City are instead regulated by the city's Department of Health and Mental Hygiene. OCFS also oversees New York's Child Care Assistance Program (CCAP), which provides subsidies to eligible families through local social services districts, funded by a state block grant combining federal and state child care funds.

A child day care center is a program or facility, other than a home-based or school-age program, that cares for children for more than three hours per day per child. A group family day care home provides child day care in a family home for 7 to 12 children, and a family day care home for 3 to 6 children (up to 8 if no more than 6 are under school age). A school-age child care program cares for more than six school-age children under 13.

== Workforce development ==
Kinship, foster, and adoptive parents can be difficult to recruit and retain. OCFS sets the training and certification standards that local social services districts and voluntary agencies use to certify foster homes. As required by federal law, the state's child welfare plan includes a plan for the diligent recruitment of foster and adoptive families.

Juvenile justice agencies nationally have reported greater difficulty hiring and retaining front-line staff. OCFS recruits through job fairs, online and print advertising, civil service pay grade changes, onboarding and retention bonuses, and the NY HELPS non-competitive hiring program. OCFS has also combined direct care titles, changed education requirements to create a career path for direct care staff, allowed work experience to substitute for formal education, permitted some required training to be completed virtually, and hired staff mentors.

Emotional burnout is a top issue, and OCFS has sponsored training specifically addressing vicarious trauma and compassion fatigue.

== Structure ==
Regional offices help local districts and agencies keep children safe, achieve permanency, and improve the quality of life for children and families. Regional offices provide oversight to local districts and voluntary agencies. The responsibility to provide oversight is defined as (1) assuring compliance with OCFS regulations, (2) reinforcing good practice standards, and (3) improving district/agency capacity to achieve positive outcomes for children and families.

OCFS administrative guidance, binding and quasi-binding, include:

- Administrative directives (ADMs) – mandatory implementation
- Informational letters (INFs) – interpretation and guidance
- Local commissioners memoranda (LCM) – administrative direction to local districts

The agency's Bureau of Training maintains the Parker Training Academy. Located on the academy grounds is a Dutch barn added to the National Register of Historic Places in 2007.

The state Council on Children and Families develops comprehensive and coordinated systems of care that respond to the wide needs of children and families.

There also exist three citizen review panels for Western New York, Eastern New York, and New York City, each with thirteen members, to examine the policies, procedures, and practices of the state's child welfare system and the extent to which it effectively discharges its child protection responsibilities in accordance with its state Child Abuse Prevention and Treatment Act (CAPTA) plan.

== Analysis and criticism ==
Juvenile delinquents placed with the county go to the same types of group homes and institutions as abused and neglected children, under the same standards. The non-delinquent children there are exposed to delinquent peers, and group home placement is associated with an increased risk of delinquency.

== History ==
In 1867 a Board of State Commissioners of Public Charities was created to visit and examine into the affairs of all charitable institutions. In 1875 the Children's Law removed children from poorhouses. In 1894 a constitutional convention enacted a provision requiring the Legislature to establish a State Board of Charities to visit and inspect all institutions. In 1909 the Poor Law was consolidated in chapter 42, and the State Charities Law in chapter 55, of the Consolidated Laws of New York. The Public Welfare Law superseded the Poor Law in 1929. In 1931 they were renamed as the Department of Social Welfare and the State Board of Social Welfare.

The Constitutional Convention of 1938 emphasized the state's and its subdivisions' duty to aid, care, and support the needy, including children. In 1940 the State Charities Law and the Public Welfare Law were combined into the Social Welfare Law. The Social Welfare Law mandated that public welfare districts, including New York City, were responsible for the welfare of children in need, either directly or through authorized agencies. In 1945, the New York State Youth Commission was created to study and make recommendations, and in 1955, the Temporary State Commission on Youth and Delinquency was created to review public policy, and in 1956 as a result of its work the State Youth Commission was reestablished as a permanent Executive Department agency. In 1960, the Division for Youth was created to supersede the commission and was authorized to establish and operate centers for the rehabilitation of delinquents. In 1967 the department was renamed as the Department of Social Services. In 1971, state and social services district youth detention centers were transferred from the department to the division.

OCFS was authorized by the Welfare Reform Act of 1997. OCFS was officially created on January 5, 1998, by merging the programs of the former state Division for Youth, the developmental and preventive children and family programs administered by the former state Department of Social Services, and the Commission for the Blind and Visually Handicapped. In 1999 the state enacted enabling legislation for the federal Adoption and Safe Families Act (ASFA). The state Council on Children and Families was created by Governor Carey in 1977, and administratively merged with OCFS in 2003. In 2005, the state established a new permanency hearing framework for foster care children, providing for ongoing court oversight and more timely permanency planning. Under Commissioner Gladys Carrión, OCFS worked to depopulate youth detention facilities and shift towards community-based alternatives. In 2012, the juvenile justice services close to home initiative moved custody of New York City juvenile delinquents placed in non-secure and limited secure settings from OCFS to the city's social services district. Also in 2012, the state Justice Center for the Protection of People with Special Needs was established to create uniform safeguards to protect people with special needs against abuse, neglect, and other conduct that would jeopardize their health, safety, and welfare.

== List of juvenile facilities ==
Secure facilities:

- Brookwood Secure Center for Youth
- Goshen Secure Center
- MacCormick Secure Center

Secure and limited secure facilities:

- Harriet Tubman Residential Center
- Industry Residential Center

Limited secure facilities:

- Finger Lakes Residential Center
- Highland Residential Center
- Taberg Residential Center for Girls

Non-secure facility:

- Brentwood Residential Center

Former Facilities (now permanently closed):

- Sgt. Henry Johnson Youth Leadership Academy (Kortright, Delaware County)
- Lansing Residential Center
- Red Hook Residential Center (Red Hook, Dutchess County)
- Columbia Girls Secure Center
- Tryon School for Boys
- Tryon School for Girls

== See also ==
- New York City Administration for Children's Services
- New York Family Court
- US Office of Juvenile Justice and Delinquency Prevention
- US Administration for Children and Families
- Child Care and Development Block Grant
