= Gladys Carrion =

American politician

Gladys Carrión

Adjunct Research Scholar, The Justice Lab at Columbia University

Personal details
- Born: The Bronx, New York
- Spouse: Hector W. Soto
- Education: New York University School of Law; Fordham University
- Profession: Researcher, Attorney and Advocate for Child Well-Being
- Website: https://justicelab.columbia.edu/people/gladys-carrion

Gladys Carrión is an Adjunct Research Scholar with Columbia University's Justice Lab and a nationally recognized advocate for improving child well-being. From 2013 to 2017, she was the Commissioner of the New York City Administration for Children's Services (ACS) and from 2007 to 2013 was the Commissioner of the New York State Office of Children and Family Services (OCFS).

== New York City Administration for Children's Services ==
Carrión is among the first officials that New York City Mayor Bill de Blasio named to lead his administration. Calling her a "change agent and reformer," he appointed Carrión commissioner of the city's child welfare agency, the New York State Office of Children and Family Services in December, 2013. “She’s devoted her whole life to our children and she understands from her own life story what it’s like for children to come up in humble circumstances and struggle, and understands how much it is our obligation to protect them all,” said de Blasio.

ACS has a $2.8 billion annual budget and 6,500 employees who supervise children in foster care, provides child abuse prevention services and administers juvenile justice. When she was named ACS commissioner, Carrión said her focus would be on improving preventive services to protect vulnerable children: “We need to focus on tightening the system so that no child falls through the cracks."

On December 12, 2016, Carrión retired under pressure after the deaths of three-year-old, Brooklyn resident, Jaden Jordan and six-year-old, Harlem resident, Zymere Perkins.

In both cases, the ACS under Carrión's leadership, failed to intervene in order save both children's lives. A 2016 NYS Office of Children and Family Services (OCFS) - Child Fatality Report (NY-16-103) stated that the death of both children, the “level of casework activity for all cases was insufficient and was particularly lacking given the family circumstances,” and that ACS “did not conduct thorough investigations and/or follow regulatory standards.”

Specifically, in the case of Jaden Jordan, the Emergency Children's Services (ECS), a unit within ACS that handles cases after weekday business hours and during weekends and holidays received an anonymous tip on Saturday November 26, 2016 that the little boy was being abused at his Brooklyn home. ECS subsequently responded two hours later, but knocked on the wrong doors because an incorrect address had been given. The next day, Sunday November 27, 2016, workers returned to Jaden's neighborhood in the Gravesend section of Brooklyn and talked to three neighbors who did not know Jaden or his family. On Monday November 28, investigators found the correct address. By then it was too late, Jaden was found unconscious by the police after Jaden's mother, had called 911 at about 4:30 p.m on November 28, 2016, saying Jaden had slipped in the shower. In a review of factors that contributed to the mix-up with Jaden's address by the Department of Investigation (DOI), it found that ECS unit's employees were not adequately trained to search databases for addresses to locate children; and child welfare specialists, who are experienced with such research, work only during business hours.

In the case of Zymere Perkin, ACS staff prematurely closed by his case despite multiple documented reports from mandated reporters and observers that suggested Zymere was being physically abused over a period of years.

Subsequently, as a result of both children's deaths, New York State directed ACS to hire an external Office of Children and Family Services (OCFS) approved monitor, to conduct a comprehensive evaluation of ACS’ Child Protective and Preventive services programs. On Dec 16, 2016, it was reported that Mayor de Blasio also ordered ACS case-workers Nitza Sutton and Francis Okeke, along with case-manager Lydia Rosado, to be fired. ACS case-workers Alanna Davis, Renee Lawrence, managing attorney Susan Starker and assistant director Lee Gordon suffered demotions.

Starker and Gordon later filed a petition against Gladys Carrión as Commissioner of ACS and the City of New York, requesting a declaration that their suspensions and demotions were arbitrary and capricious, to be made financially whole, and to order ACS to conduct a name-clearing hearing. Ultimately their petition was dismissed by Manhattan Supreme Court Judge Manuel J. Mendez. Judge Mendez wrote that:

"ACS found that in 2014 Petitioners were made aware of allegations that Nitza Sutton, an ACS Child Protective Specialist assigned to the case of the young boy [Zymere Perkins], falsified documents. Petitioners, who were responsible for bringing disciplinary proceedings against employees suspected of incompetence or misconduct, subsequently initiated an internal audit of Sutton's case that eventually appeared to confirm Sutton's professional malpractice. The completed Sutton audit was sent to Petitioners in October of 2014 as it was then their responsibility to bring the findings to the attention of the Department of Investigation ("DOI") who could bring charges against Sutton for incompetence. Petitioners failed to alert the DOI and Sutton subsequently returned to her full duty, and resumed responsibility over the file of the young boy [Zymere Perkins]."

In February 2017, Mayor de Blasio replaced Carrión as Commissioner of ACS with social services manager David A. Hansell, Esq.

== New York State Office for Children and Family Services ==
Until her appointment by New York City Mayor Bill de Blasio, Carrión served as New York State Governor Andrew Cuomo's commissioner for the New York State Office of Children and Family Services (OCFS). She was appointed by Governor Eliot Spitzer in January, 2007. OCFS provides oversight of child well-being in local counties. This includes child abuse prevention, a 24-hour child abuse hotline, child abuse investigations, and protective services; foster care and adoption; and child care. OCFS also manages New York's juvenile justice system and supervises county-based juvenile justice programs. In addition, OCFS supervises the Commission for the Blind and Visually Handicapped (CBVH) and New York State's response to the needs of Native Americans. OCFS has an annual budget of nearly four billion dollars.

=== Juvenile justice ===
Commissioner Carrión earned the most recognition for her initiative to transform the juvenile justice system she inherited, from a "custody and control" model with a reputation for using excessive force on children; no oversight and few resources; and an 89 percent recidivism rate, to an evidence-based, trauma-informed, community-centered therapeutic model. This transformation has significantly improved child well-being—while at the same time improving public safety in local counties. The New York State Bar Association in June, 2009, honored Carrión with the Howard A. Levine Award for Excellence in Juvenile Justice and Child Welfare for this initiative. More recently, the National Juvenile Justice Network and Texas Public Policy Foundation singled out New York State for the implementation of Commissioner Carrión's initiatives.

==== Close to home ====
After closing most of the state's juvenile jails, Carrión and New York State Governor Andrew Cuomo changed New York State law so that they would stay closed and the troubled children who used to be sent away would now stay close to home where they would get treatment for the mental health and alcohol and substance abuse problems and developmental delays from which 90 percent suffer.

=== Family assessment response ===
Under her leadership, OCFS developed a framework for child well-being in New York State's 62 counties that builds on the pillars of safety and permanency to improve outcomes for children and families. This includes implementing a Family Assessment Response (FAR) in child protection cases that do not include allegations of child abuse. Instead of exercising a traditional law enforcement approach, FAR now supports families involved in child neglect allegations with services and interventions to address their needs.

=== Child care ===
Carrión also established an OCFS Division for Child Care Services for the first time, and charged it with moving beyond simply regulating child care, to implementing policies and program to improve child care to enhance children's capacity to succeed in school and later in life.

=== Bridges to Health (B2H) ===
Additionally, she implemented Bridges to Health (B2H), a Federal Medicaid-waiver program to provide comprehensive family and community support services to medically fragile children in foster care and their families.

=== LGBTQ rights ===
For the first time, New York State promulgated policies expanding the umbrella of constitutional and civil rights protections to LGBTQ youth when Carrión wrote and institutionalized agency policy protecting youth in state care.

== Early life, education, and early career ==
Carrión was born and raised in the South Bronx. After graduating from Fordham University, she earned a Juris Doctor degree from the New York University School of Law. Upon graduation, Carrión took a job as an attorney at the Bronx Legal Services Corporation, launching what would turn out to be a long and distinguished career as an advocate for poor and working families.

At Bronx Legal Services, she represented residents on issues ranging from housing, welfare, education, to family law. Carrión quickly rose to become managing attorney in the South Bronx, the poorest U.S. Congressional district in the nation.

While at Bronx Legal Services, New York City Mayor Edward Koch named Carrión to the board of trustees of the City University of New York (CUNY), the largest urban university system in the United States. He also named her as chair of the New York City Schools Chancellor's Task Force on Latino Educational Opportunities.

Upon his election, New York City Mayor David Dinkins pulled her from the South Bronx to lead the then much-maligned Community Development Agency (CDA). CDA was responsible for the allocation of nearly half-a-billion dollars in federal funds that were supposed to address the human services needs of the city's most vulnerable children and families living in the city's poorest neighborhoods. During Carrión's tenure, she conducted the agency's first neighborhood poverty assessment identifying communities of need. She also for the first-time created a transparent process for directing the allocation of federal funds and established a system of accountability to ensure the quality performance of more than 300 funded community-based organizations.

Following her government service, Carrión served as executive director at Family Dynamics, where she developed policies and programs to strengthen families and to help them avoid having their children placed in foster care by the New York City Administration for Children's Services.

After a period as a community development program officer at the Ford Foundation, Carrión was named executive director of Inwood House, one of the oldest programs in the city working to lift children and families out of poverty.

She also served as New York Foundation Board of Directors Chairperson, on the Legal Services of New York Executive Committee, and the Child Welfare Watch Advisory Board.

Before Governor Eliot Spitzer named her commissioner for the Office of Children and Family Services, Carrión was senior vice president for community investment at United Way of New York City.
