= New York City Administration for Children's Services =

New York City government agency

Administration for Children's Services

Department overview
- Jurisdiction: New York City
- Headquarters: 110 William Street New York, NY 10038
- Employees: 6,407 (FY 2026)
- Annual budget: $3.65 billion (FY 2026)
- Department executive: Rebecca Jones Gaston, Commissioner
- Key document: New York City Charter
- Website: www.nyc.gov/acs

The New York City Administration for Children's Services (ACS) is a New York City government agency that handles child protective service and delinquency proceedings in New York City. ACS has been the subject of numerous civil rights lawsuits involving the wrongful removals and deaths of children as well as constitutional violations of both parents and children.

== Responsibilities ==
Each year, the agency's Division of Child Protection conducts more than 55,000 investigations of suspected child abuse or neglect.

In juvenile justice, ACS manages and funds services including detention and placement, intensive community-based alternatives for youth, and support services for families.

In early care and education, ACS provides vouchers for children eligible for subsidized care.

Front entrance of 110 William Street, Manhattan, New York City - current home of New York City Administration for Children's Services

In 2017, ACS created an entirely new division within the agency called "Child and Family Well-Being." This division focuses on a primary prevention approach, with resources and services to help them prosper. As part of the division, ACS launched three Family Enrichment Centers (FEC) in neighborhoods with the highest rate of child welfare involvement. In 2021, ACS announced the expansion of the Family Enrichment Centers, from 3 to 30 sites across the City over the next three years, everything about each FEC—from the name, to the physical layout, to the services offered—was co-developed with families and the community. The FECs are open to all families in their communities and provide a range of services that support healthy child development.

In 2021, ACS created a brand-new office, The Office of Child Safety and Injury Prevention, which supports ongoing child safety campaigns, including those related to unsafe sleep practices, hot car tragedies, window guards, unsafe storage of prescription medications and, most recently, accidental ingestion of marijuana edibles.

== History ==
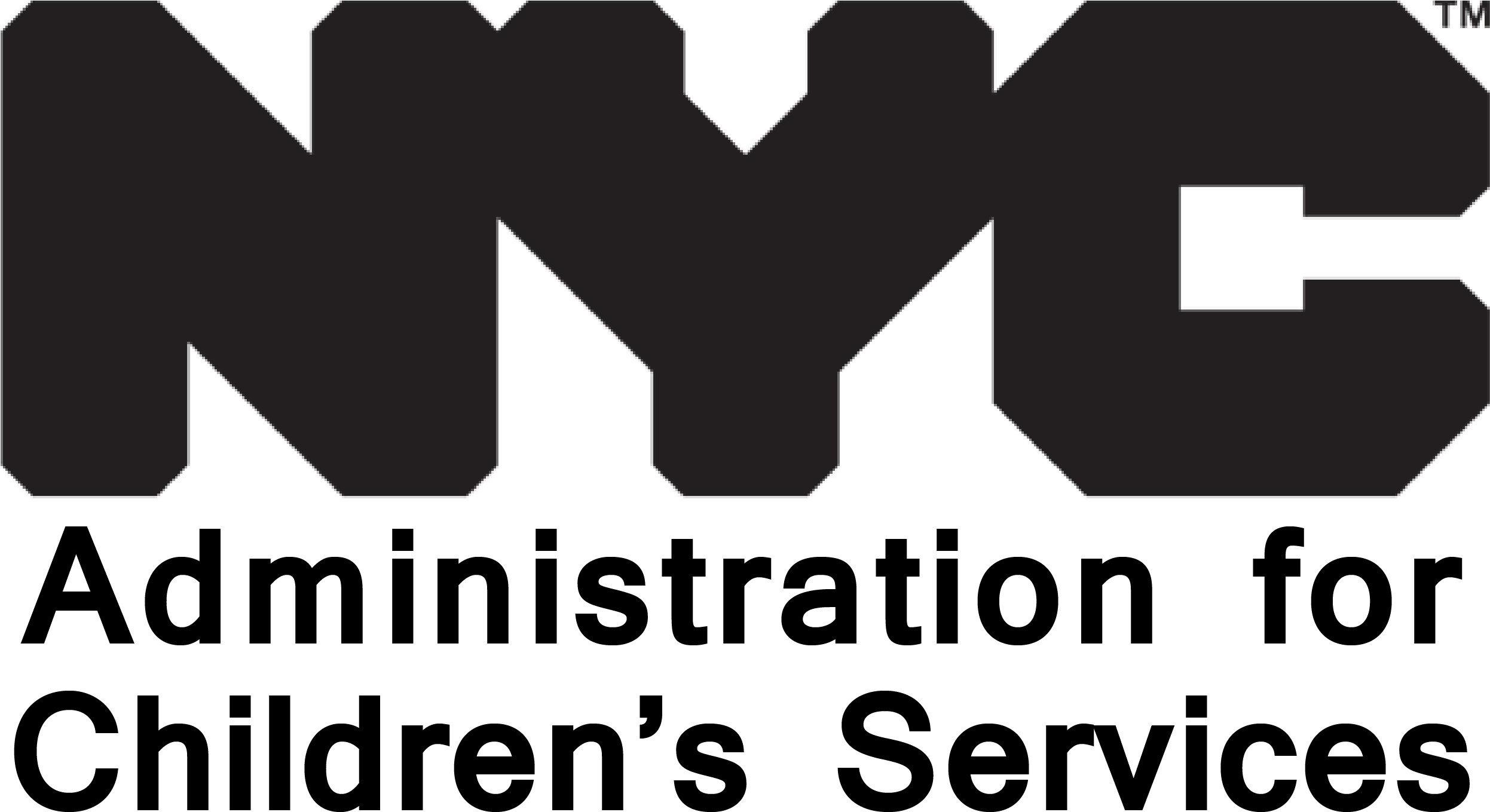
The original logo of the agency

The NYC Department of Public Charities and Corrections was established in 1860. Due to objections over combining pauper care with penal services, the department was divided into the NYC Department of Public Charities (for hospitals and welfare) and the NYC Department of Correction in 1895. In 1920, the department was renamed the NYC Department of Public Welfare, overseeing hospitals, homes for the aged, nursing schools, and other welfare services.

The Constitutional Convention of 1938 emphasized the state's and its subdivisions' duty to aid, care, and support the needy, including children. In 1940 the charity and public welfare laws were combined into the Social Welfare Law, which mandated that public welfare districts, including New York City, were responsible for the welfare of children in need, either directly or through authorized agencies. In 1938, the city department was simplified to the NYC Department of Welfare, and in 1966 under Mayor John Lindsay the Human Resources Administration/Department of Social Services was created by consolidating many of the city's existing social service administrations.

When it was created in 1966 it was known as the Bureau of Child Welfare (or BCW). In 1969, Lindsay placed it under the Human Resources Administration, and changed its name to Special Services for Children. Mayor Ed Koch later renamed it the Child Welfare Administration in the 1980s, shortly after the death of a 6-year-old in the West Village. In 1995, shortly after the murder of Elisa Izquierdo, Mayor Rudolph Giuliani made the agency separate of the Human Resources Administration and renamed it to the Administration for Children's Services. The Department of Juvenile Justice (DJJ) was merged into ACS in November 2010.

Its first Commissioner was Nicholas Scoppetta who would serve until 2001 when he left the agency to become the New York City Fire Commissioner. In 2001 William Bell was appointed Commissioner. From 2004 until 2011, John B. Mattingly served as Commissioner under Mayor Michael Bloomberg. New York City Civil Court Judge Ronald Richter assumed the role of ACS Commissioner in 2011. In January 2014, newly inaugurated Mayor Bill de Blasio appointed Gladys Carrión Commissioner of the agency. In 2017, Mayor Bill de Blasio appointed David A. Hansell as Commissioner. Immediately following Hansell's appointment, he conducted a top-to-bottom review of the agency to examine every aspect of child protective work. In December 2021, Mayor Eric Adams appointed Jess Dannhauser as Commissioner of ACS. In March 2026, Melissa Hester was appointed interim commissioner after Dannhauser's resignation.

== Growth ==
The agency has been expanded repeatedly, after incidents in which children were killed by their parents. In 1995, after Giuliani had previously refused to expand the agency, he created 200 new jobs in response to Elisa Izquierdo being killed by her mentally ill mother. Mayor Michael Bloomberg eliminated 169 of those jobs in 2003. However, in 2006, Bloomberg increased the size of the agency, in the wake of the murder of Nixzmary Brown by her stepfather. The death of Nixzmary was also followed by a spike in abuse reports, which greatly increased pressure on the agency. In 2014, the agency saw even more expansion after three children died; Mayor Bill de Blasio hired 362 new staff members, which drastically reduced case workers' work load.

As of 2019, Commissioner Hansell hired over 1,100 new child protective specialists.

== Initiatives ==
Foster Care Strategic Blueprint: In 2016, ACS developed and issued the ACS Foster Care Strategic Blueprint (FY 2016-FY 2018). The Blueprint identified key priorities and strategies for improving case practice and results across the foster care continuum—from family reunification to kinship placement to adoption to supporting older youth in care. In 2018, the next phase of this work was in the five-year ACS Foster Care Strategic Blueprint (FY2019-FY2023). The five-year plan builds upon the progress made under the 2020 blueprint, and is informed by the recommendations of the NYC Interagency Foster Care Task Force, the findings from a major review showed ACS has increased the proportion of children placed with relatives and friends from 31% in 2018 to 43% in 2021. As of 2022, the number of children in New York City's foster care system is approximately 7,200, a historic low.

The NYC Child Tattoo Eradication Project and Network: The NYC Child Tattoo Eradication Project and Network is composed of leaders within the ACS Office of Child Trafficking Prevention and Policy, the ACS Agency Medical Director and its Office of Older Youth, along with medical professionals with prior experience in tattoo removal. The network was first developed when ACS learned of a vulnerable teen whose pimp's initials had been tattooed onto her forehead. Seeking a solution that would provide physical and emotional support to the teen and to others in similar situations, ACS professionals sought the expertise and contributions of medical professionals with prior experience in tattoo removal. The providers who expressed interest in contributing their time and expertise joined the Network. The NYC Child Tattoo Eradication Network is operated by ACS’ Office of Child Trafficking Prevention and Policy, with several goals in mind. First, to ensure that all ACS involved youth have the opportunity to safely remove exploiter or gang brandings. Second, to reduce trauma by connecting medical providers with case planners and youth to provide an opportunity for shared discussion of situational understanding and to provide tattoo removal in a trauma informed, and physically and emotionally safe environment. Third, to provide training to medical providers on trafficking and gang dynamics to enhance their knowledge of, and empathy for branded youth.

Close to Home: The Close to Home program allows young people found to need a period of out-of-home placement by the Family Court to be placed in residential programs closer to their families and communities. Under Close to Home, young people receive therapeutic services at small group homes in or near the five boroughs where they are close to resources that can support their treatment and transition back into their communities.

ACSConnectME: ACSConnectME is a mobile website for youth in foster care, foster parents, adoptive parents, families and child welfare professionals. The site provides users with greater access to information about services and resources across ACS, other government agencies and more. Users can search for the services that are right for them (education, housing, parenting support, etc.) in the location in which they reside. ACSConnectMe is the brainchild of a former foster youth who pitched the idea at a NYC Foster Care Technology & Policy Hackathon sponsored by ACS, after explaining the need to more easily access resources about education, housing and more all in one place.

JustUs is an ACS diversion program, New York City's first-ever gender-responsive diversion program for girls and lesbian, gay, bisexual/transgender and gender non- conforming (LGB/TGNCNB) youth, ages 12–18, who are involved or at high risk of involvement in the juvenile justice system. The program is in partnership with the nonprofit Rising Ground and Girls for Gender Equity.

Group Attachment Based Intervention: ACS entered into a partnership with the Group Attachment Based Intervention (GABI) model through Montefiore Hospital and over the years has expanded this model across the entire city. GABI helps caregivers build strong bonds with their young children and foster their healthy development. The program provides clinician-facilitated play therapy, allowing parents to strengthen attachment with their children, which research demonstrates reduces the risks of child maltreatment. The program also provides parents one-on-one clinical sessions and peer support through parent groups.

Fair Futures: Fair Futures, launched in 2019, and is a public-private partnership, that provides dedicated coaches, tutors and education, employment and housing specialists for youth in foster care ages 11 to 21. Since the program's launch, thousands of youth in foster care have been supported. Fair Futures is a coalition of child welfare agencies, nonprofits, foundations and advocates working together to help ensure the future success of young people.

Support for LGBTQ Youth: The LGBTQ Office was established in September 2012 and is composed of a team of leading experts who support the system-wide implementation of the agency's LGBTQ policies and best practices. This Office has developed a national LGBTQ policy and practice model, which has resulted in critical service delivery improvements for LGBTQ stakeholders. Specifically, this model included developing one of the nation's most progressive LGBTQ policies, designing model training curricula for thousands of ACS and provider staff, implementing a reporting and monitoring system to identify policy gaps, engaging community stakeholders for ongoing feedback, and offering a wealth of resources to equip staff with the necessary skills to address the specific needs of LGBTQ children and youth. In 2020 ACS created the LGBTQAI+ Action Plan to Strengthen Services and Supports for LGBTQAI+ Youth in Foster Care. The multi-pronged action plan includes the creation of a dedicated LGBTQAI+ Committee as part of the ACS Youth Leadership Council; expanding recruitment targeting foster parents interested in fostering LGBTQAI+ youth; revising and strengthening staff training on LGBTQAI+ issues; increasing services and supports for LGBTQAI+ youth in foster care; and more.

On January 6, 2020, the agency unveiled a new text logo which simply reads "NYC Children." The new logo emphasized the agency's mission to protect and support children and their families, as well as to maintain consistency with the branding of other New York City agencies; for example, the Department of Health and Mental Hygiene's logo reads "NYC Health" and the Department of Buildings' logo reads "NYC Buildings." The agency's press release noted that this was their first branding change since 1995.

== Budget ==
ACS’ Fiscal 2020 Executive Budget totals $2.66 billion.

== Public safety ==
This agency employs Special Officers who provide on-site safety & security at 25 facilities across New York City, including city-owned juvenile justice detention centers.. ACS special officers have very limited peace officer authority pursuant to New York State Criminal Procedure Law § 2.10(40) and ACS policies. ACS Special Officers are prohibited by state law from carrying a firearm.

The New York City Police Department is the primary policing and investigation agency within New York City as per the NYC Charter, They respond to all incidents that occur at NYC Administration for Children's Services facilities.

== See also ==
- New York State Office of Children and Family Services
