= Rivera request =

A Rivera Request, also known as an evidence packet request, is the document used for requesting evidence relating to a New York fair hearing pursuant to the stipulation and settlement in Rivera v. Bane.

The request document is labeled W-186A.

== Rules ==
- If the Rivera request is made 5 or more business days before the hearing, then the Local Department of Social Services (LDSS) has five business days to put a reply in the mail.
- If the request is made less than 5 business days before the hearing the LDSS must mail an evidence packet if requested and bring a copy to the hearing for the appellant.

If the documents are not sent out, the hearing may be adjourned, or the documents may be excluded if they were evidence against the appellant or if the hearing officer determines that further delay would be prejudicial against the appellant may rule in the appellants favor.

== See also ==
- Law of New York
- Judiciary of New York
