= Murder of Harmony Montgomery =

Child murder in New Hampshire, US

- Location: Manchester, New Hampshire, U.S.
- Date: c. 2019
- Attack type: Child murder
- Victim: Harmony Montgomery
- Perpetrator: Adam Montgomery
- Motive: Unknown
- Charges: Second-degree murder, abuse of a corpse, falsifying evidence, witness tampering and assault
- Verdict: Guilty
- Convictions: Second-degree murder (overturned), abuse of a corpse, falsifying evidence, witness tampering and assault

Harmony Renee Montgomery (June 7, 2014 – disappeared c. 2019; declared legally dead March 12, 2024) was a 5-year-old American girl who was murdered by her biological father Adam Montgomery (overturned ruling) in Manchester, New Hampshire, after a Massachusetts judge awarded him custody in late 2019. Her biological mother, Crystal Sorey, reported her daughter missing to New Hampshire police in late 2021, more than two years after Harmony's last reported sighting.

Adam Montgomery and his wife Kayla were charged with second-degree murder, with the trial beginning on 8 February 2024. On February 22, 2024, Adam Montgomery was found guilty of murder. He was sentenced to 45 years to life in prison on May 9, 2024.

Harmony Montgomery's murder sparked outrage and calls for reforms of child protective systems.

== Early life ==
Harmony Renee Montgomery was born on June 7, 2014, to Crystal Sorey and Adam Montgomery; her parents were no longer together at the time of her birth. Harmony was blind in her right eye and had special needs. Crystal Sorey originally had sole custody, as Adam Montgomery was incarcerated when Harmony was born, but within days of her birth there were multiple reports of alleged neglect to the Department of Children and Families. Harmony was placed into foster care with Tim and Michelle Raftery at two months old, and spent the next four years in DCF custody and various foster homes. Sorey, a recovering drug addict, permanently lost custody of Harmony and her other child in 2018.

In 2019, Adam Montgomery was awarded full custody of Harmony by Judge Mark Newman, despite Adam having been incarcerated for most of Harmony's early years and having spent only 40 hours with her on supervised contact visits up to that point. A later report from the Office of the Child Advocate found that the DCF had failed to complete an adequate assessment of Adam Montgomery and to present a strong legal case to oppose placing Harmony into her father's care. Adam was living with his wife Kayla and their two sons in New Hampshire at the time. Both Adam and Kayla had substance abuse issues, paying their drug dealer using their SNAP food stamps, resulting in the family not having enough food.

== Abuse and death ==
Harmony was subjected to beatings and abuse by her father. When Adam's uncle, Kevin Montgomery, noticed that Harmony had a black eye, Adam allegedly told him that he "bashed her around". Kevin contacted child protective agencies to report the abuse, but nothing came of it.

In late 2019, the Montgomerys were evicted from their home and began to live in their car before moving to a homeless shelter. Adam and Kayla continued to have major substance abuse issues. While living in the car, Adam repeatedly beat Harmony, who had trouble with bathroom accidents, a problem that had not started until they were homeless. After going into a rage one morning while the family were travelling to a methadone clinic, Adam beat Harmony to death and hid her body in a duffel bag. He and Kayla then would go on to conceal her remains for several months, initially freezing the body and later thawing it out to cut up the remains and dissolve them in lye. Harmony's body has never been recovered.

On March 12, 2024, a New Hampshire judge granted Harmony's mother Crystal Sorey's request to have Harmony declared legally dead due to Adam Montgomery's confession to abusing her corpse.

== Police investigation of the case ==
Harmony's mother, Crystal Sorey, became concerned when Adam didn't bring Harmony to visit for Thanksgiving. She questioned him on Facebook about Harmony, but he blocked her. Sorey then filed a missing person report for her daughter. Adam Montgomery, meanwhile, claimed that Harmony was living with her mother. In December 2021, the Manchester Police Department held a press conference about the case while cooperating with New Hampshire authorities. Police also interviewed Michael Montgomery, Adam's brother, who said he had witnessed his brother's abusive nature toward Harmony.

On August 11, 2022, Manchester Police Chief Allen Aldenberg and New Hampshire Attorney General John Formella stated they believed that Harmony was dead, and that her father murdered her.

== Trials and legal proceedings ==
Adam Montgomery was charged with second-degree murder, and the trial began on February 8, 2024, in the Superior Court in Hillsborough County. At the time of the trial, he was already in prison serving a 30-year sentence after a conviction for an unrelated gun crime the previous year, and he refused to attend court. Prosecutor Christopher Knowles took the case, while Montgomery was represented by Caroline Smith and James Brooks.

Kayla Montgomery was also serving a prison sentence at the time of the trial, having earlier been convicted of perjury due to lying to a Grand Jury about the events surrounding Harmony's death. She testified against her now ex-husband Adam, who she said had been physically and emotionally abusive to her and Harmony, and said that he had beaten Harmony to death in December 2019, but that she had not spoken up as she still cared for him.

On February 22, 2024, Adam Montgomery was found guilty of second-degree murder and falsifying physical evidence by the jury. He was sentenced to 45 years to life in prison on May 9, 2024, with the sentence to be served consecutively with the sentence he was already serving for the unrelated weapons charges.

On June 11, 2026, the New Hampshire Supreme Court reversed the murder conviction, siding with Adam Montgomery's argument that the assault charge should have been tried separately. The court let the other charges stand.
