= Murder of Joseph Wallace =

1993 murder in Illinois, United States

Joseph Wayne Wallace
- Born: July 29, 1989; Chicago, Illinois, U.S.
- Died: April 19, 1993 (aged 3); Chicago, Illinois, U.S.
- Cause of death: Murder by strangulation

Joseph Wayne Wallace (July 29, 1989 – April 19, 1993) was a three-year-old boy who was murdered by his mother in their Chicago, Illinois apartment in 1993. Wallace's mother, Amanda Wallace (July 24, 1965 – August 3, 1997), was known to be mentally ill. Despite this, Joseph and his younger brother Joshua were removed from a foster family and returned to Amanda, who killed Joseph with an electrical cord. The circumstances of Wallace's death and the ensuing public outcry precipitated large changes in the Illinois child welfare system and the Cook County juvenile court.

In June 1996, Amanda Wallace was convicted of her son's murder in a bench trial. Prosecutors sought a death sentence, but the judge sentenced her to life in prison. He declared that execution would likely be a mercy for the defendant, but said he did not think it was warranted. Amanda hanged herself in her cell on August 3, 1997.

Joshua, Amanda Wallace's surviving son, spent years stuck in the child welfare system. Shortly after Joseph's death Joshua began to display significant emotional and behavioral outbursts, either from witnessing his brother's murder or the continued disruption in his placements. From 1993 to 1995, Joshua lived in the care of Erma and Phillip Lee in Oak Park, Illinois. By May 1995, Joshua was again removed from his only long-term home placement over claims the Lees sought to exploit Joshua for larger state payments. Joshua was adopted by Illinois resident Maria Travis in August 1997. Following his adoption, Joshua's name was legally changed to Joshua Travis.

== See also ==
- List of homicides in Illinois
- Social programs in the United States
