= Murder of Elisa Izquierdo =

Child abuse case

Elisa Izquierdo
- Izquierdo in 1995
- Born: Elisa Izquierdo; February 11, 1989; Brooklyn, New York City, U.S.
- Died: November 22, 1995 (aged 6); Manhattan, New York City, U.S.
- Cause of death: Brain hemorrhage, multiple trauma, child abuse
- Resting place: Cypress Hills Cemetery, Brooklyn, New York; 40.6956°N 73.8761°W (approximate)

The murder of Elisa Izquierdo occurred in November 1995 in Manhattan, New York City. Izquierdo was a six-year-old Puerto Rican–Cuban-American girl who died of a brain hemorrhage inflicted by her mother, Awilda Lopez, at the peak of a prolonged and escalating campaign of physical, mental, emotional, and sexual abuse conducted between 1994 and 1995.

Described by authorities as the "worst case of child abuse they had ever seen," Elisa's story made national headlines when it was discovered that New York City's child welfare system (now the Administration for Children's Services) had missed numerous opportunities to intervene in her case and ultimately save her life. These failures to protect Elisa subsequently became the inspiration for Elisa's Law, a major restructuring of the city's child welfare system; increasing accountability of all parties involved in child welfare and reducing areas of confidentiality relating to public disclosure in cases of this nature. Elisa's Law was implemented in February 1996.

Elisa has been referred to as a modern-day Cinderella because she had at first been under the protection of a loving father and had befriended Prince Michael of Greece—who had offered to pay for her private tuition until 12th grade—before being placed into the permanent custody of her mother.

== Early life ==
Elisa Izquierdo was born on February 11, 1989, in Woodhull Hospital Brooklyn, New York. Her father, Gustavo Izquierdo, was a Cuban immigrant who had emigrated to the United States with aspirations to become a dance teacher; her mother, Awilda Lopez, was of Puerto Rican descent. The couple met at a Fort Greene homeless shelter two years prior to Elisa's birth, where Gustavo worked part-time as a cleaner and caterer. Awilda herself was a temporary resident at the shelter, having been evicted from the apartment she shared with a previous partner, Ruben Rivera (with whom she had born two children), due to the couple's failure to pay rent—in part due to her extensive drug abuse. The two began a temporary relationship, although reportedly, this ended when Gustavo discovered Awilda—at the time pregnant with Elisa—was a regular user of crack cocaine. Concern by her own family as to her extensive usage of drugs resulted in Awilda losing custody of her two eldest children, Rubencino and Kasey, to her own family in January 1989.

When Elisa was born, social workers stated to the city's child welfare administration services that the child was born addicted to crack cocaine. As a result of her mother's evident addiction, full custody of Elisa was awarded to her father, Gustavo, who despite having no prior parenting experience was, by all accounts, a doting, caring father to Elisa—attending parenting classes, seeking advice from relatives as to how to care for his daughter, organizing celebrations for her first birthdays, and renting a banquet hall to celebrate her baptism at age four. As one family friend would later relate, "[Elisa] was his life. He would always say she was his princess."

=== Preschool ===
In 1990, Gustavo enrolled his daughter in the Montessori preschool, although shortly thereafter, his incipient ailing health complicated his ability to pay for Elisa's schooling. As Elisa was such an outstanding and promising student and Gustavo such a dedicated father, both teachers and the school principal introduced her to one of the school's patrons, Prince Michael of Greece, in 1993. Reportedly, upon his arrival at the school, Elisa leaped into Prince Michael's arms, and stayed by his side for the rest of the day. He in turn offered to pay for Elisa's private tuition at the independent Brooklyn Friends School until 12th grade; she in turn responded to this gesture with a handwritten note expressing her gratitude. Occasionally thereafter, Prince Michael of Greece would send Elisa small gifts, to which she would express her thanks by responding with drawings or notes.

=== Partial custodial rights of mother ===
The same year Elisa was enrolled in preschool, a social worker signed an affidavit stating that Awilda had successfully beaten her addiction, had secured permanent accommodation within the Rutgers Houses project in Two Bridges, Manhattan, and had married a maintenance worker named Carlos Lopez, with whom she was now expecting her fourth child. In December 1990, having given birth to a daughter named Taisha, she regained custody of her two oldest children.

In November 1991, Awilda Lopez secured the right to obtain unsupervised visitation rights to Elisa: this ruling awarded her custody of the child every second weekend. Reportedly, Awilda's two oldest children informed relatives that throughout these unsupervised visits, Elisa would be beaten and neglected by her mother and stepfather. These relatives did not inform authorities of these revelations.

Both Elisa's father and her teachers noted the child bore bruising and other signs of physical mistreatment when she returned from these unsupervised visits. One of the locations of these injuries was Elisa's genitalia and the child did divulge that her mother had repeatedly hit her and locked her in a closet, adding that she had no desire to see her mother again. Her father also noted that Elisa had begun bedwetting in addition to losing control of her bowels, and would regularly experience nightmares upon learning she was to be in the custody of her mother for even short periods of time. Another family acquaintance noted that Elisa would always vomit upon her return from these visits to her mother, and refused to enter bathrooms.

== Death of father ==
Both Gustavo Izquierdo and Elisa's teachers did inform authorities of the abuse Elisa was enduring at the hands of her mother and stepfather. These revelations were also disclosed by Elisa herself to a social worker and her father did apply in 1992 to have Awilda Lopez's visitation rights ceased; however, the courts ruled that the visitation rights could continue, albeit with the conditions Awilda must not strike or otherwise harm her daughter.

In 1993, Gustavo Izquierdo formed plans to relocate with Elisa to his native Cuba. He is known to have purchased airline tickets for himself and his daughter, with the travel date being May 26, 1994. However, in May, Gustavo was admitted to hospital with acute respiratory complications (subsequently diagnosed as lung cancer). Gustavo Izquierdo died on May 26; the same date he had planned to travel to Cuba with Elisa. (Note: Both prior to and after his diagnosis as suffering from terminal lung cancer, Gustavo Izquierdo had earnestly requested that, should he die or be incapable of caring for his daughter, Elisa should be placed in the custody of her aunt or a biological relative of his, and not Awilda Lopez.) Shortly thereafter, when Elisa asked her mother where her father was, Awilda simply screamed the words, "Your father's dead!"

Upon hearing news of Gustavo's death, the director of Elisa's school, Phyllis Bryce, contacted a family court judge to express the grave concerns of both herself and numerous members of the school's staff as to the child's safety should her mother gain custody of her.

=== Full custodial awarding to mother ===
Upon hearing news of Gustavo's death, Awilda applied for full, permanent custody of Elisa. She was initially granted temporary custody of the child. Upon hearing the initial awarding of Elisa's temporary custody to Awilda Lopez, Elsa Canizares—the cousin of Gustavo and Elisa—challenged the ruling and herself applied for custody of Elisa; citing the documented abuse Elisa had previously endured during the unsupervised weekend visits with her mother, and the manner in which Awilda is known to have spoken to the child. Both the head teacher of the school Elisa still attended and Prince Michael of Greece also wrote personal letters to Judge Phoebe Greenbaum, opposing the initial temporary custody of Elisa awarded to Awilda Lopez upon the death of her father and endorsing Elsa Canizares's application to obtain permanent custody of Elisa. Furthermore, in his letter to Judge Greenbaum, Prince Michael of Greece emphasized his intentions to pay for Elisa's education at Brooklyn Friends School should Elsa Canizares be awarded custody of the child.

Lacking sufficient funding to pay legal fees, Elsa Canizares attended court hearings without any legal representation, whereas backing Awilda Lopez's application for custody were a lawyer from the Legal Aid Society and a federally funded parenting program. According to Elsa Canizares, at this hearing, the legal representatives for Awilda testified as to her "valiant efforts" to refrain from relapsing into drug use, falsely claiming that caseworkers had visited the Lopez residence and that Elisa had expressed a strong desire to live with her biological mother. Furthermore, Canizares was criticized by Awilda's legal representation at this hearing for having "the nerve" to try and take Elisa from her biological mother. To this accusation, Elsa Canizares replied her nerve was borne out of fear of Elisa being placed with her mother. (Note: Prior to these hearings, the director of Elisa's Montessori preschool, Phyllis Bryce, personally wrote a letter to Judge Greenbaum endorsing Elsa Canizares's application to be awarded custody of Elisa, citing the evident emotional and physical abuse the child had repeatedly endured while in the custody of her mother as her reasoning for this decision.)

"There was a solution. There were people ready to take this child ... to love this child."

— Prince Michael of Greece, reflecting on a personal letter he wrote to Judge Phoebe Greenbaum endorsing Elsa Canizares's application to be awarded custody of Elisa Izquierdo in 1994

Awilda Lopez's application to obtain permanent custody of Elisa was approved by Judge Greenbaum in September 1994.

=== Escalation of abuse ===
Upon being awarded full custody of her daughter, Awilda withdrew Elisa from the private school she had been attending, and enrolled her in Manhattan's Public School 126, where Elisa was quickly observed to be withdrawn, emotionally disturbed, uncommunicative, and to urinate frequently. The principal of this school also noted that Elisa bore numerous bruises, walked with apparent difficulty, and had evidently begun tearing out sections of her hair.

On March 14, 1995, an anonymous letter was posted to the Manhattan Child Welfare Authorities. The author of this letter stated that Awilda Lopez had cut off much of Elisa's hair and had begun locking her in a dark room for extensive periods of time. Six days later, Elisa was admitted to hospital with a fractured shoulder—the injury having been untreated for three days. (Note: Carlos Lopez would claim to hospital staff this injury had been caused as a result of Elisa jumping off of a bunk bed. When Elisa responded to questions by hospital staff regarding several cuts upon her lips, the child reportedly replied: "Last night I ate a lot of sugar, and the roaches bit me.")

The increasing concerns of staff at Public School 126 regarding evident abuse were also reported to the Manhattan Child Welfare Authorities. Reportedly, the Manhattan Child Welfare Authorities soon replied to the school that their concerns were "not reportable" due to a lack of direct evidence of child abuse or neglect. As such, this report was rejected. A further factor in this decision was the fact Elisa had been under court-ordered caseworker supervision. In response to the school having reporting the suspected abuse of her daughter to the Manhattan Child Welfare Authorities and a subsequent home visit by staff at the school, Awilda—by this time known to have reverted to regular crack cocaine use—withdrew Elisa from Public School 126 in December 1994. She made no effort to enroll Elisa in any other school.

Reportedly, despite having borne six children by this time (three of whom had been born after Elisa), Awilda targeted Elisa for almost all of the abuse she inflicted upon her children. (Note: The abuse endured by Elisa's siblings after Awilda obtained custody of her daughter included beatings with leather straps and placing their hands upon hot stoves.) After withdrawing her from her school, Elisa was locked in her bedroom, was denied any opportunity to socialize with her siblings or to leave the apartment and was denied access to the toilet—being forced to use a chamber pot. Neighbors also reported hearing sounds of Elisa being beaten and otherwise abused, later reporting hearing Elisa's repeatedly pleading with her mother to stop hitting her, crying out pleas such as: "Mommy, Mommy, please stop! No more! I'm sorry." Some neighbors did report their suspicions of child abuse to child welfare authorities; however, no effective action was taken. Other neighbors reportedly knew of the abuse Elisa and—to a much lesser degree—her siblings endured, but failed to notify authorities. (Note: Following Elisa's murder, a neighbor of Awilda Lopez named Tony Ng would justify the collective failure of all her neighbors who had heard the ongoing sounds of Elisa's evident abuse and her pleading to her mother for the mistreatment to cease by simply stating: "We thought it [was simply] her way of disciplining her kids. That's not unusual, in this building at least.") Some neighbors noted that Awilda would refer to Elisa as a "Mongoloid" and a "filthy little whore" who had been placed under a spell by her father.

A representative from the federally funded parenting program which had endorsed Awilda's initial motion to achieve sole custody of her daughter also reported that Awilda had herself phoned him, complaining that her daughter was unable to control her bladder or bowels, had cut off her hair and was apparently drinking from the toilet. In response to this phone call from Awilda, this representative did call a representative from the Manhattan Child Welfare Authorities, who rebuffed his requests to visit the Lopez residence.

"In my 22 years of service with the New York City Police Department ... this is the worst case of child abuse I have ever seen."

— Lieutenant Luis Gonzalez, recollecting the extensive physical, mental, emotional, and sexual abuse suffered by Elisa Izquierdo (1995)

Other indignities and abuse inflicted by Awilda upon her daughter (some of which were witnessed by Elisa's siblings) included repeated punching and kicking, forcing the child to eat her own feces or drink ammoniated water, mopping the floor with Elisa's head and face, inflicting burns upon the child's head, face, lips, and body, sexually violating her both vaginally and anally with a hairbrush or toothbrush, hanging her from a shower rod for the purpose of entertainment, and dropping a chest of drawers on her ring finger and toe. (Note: Awilda is also known to have claimed to an acquaintance to have once slid snakes down Elisa's throat. It is unknown whether this particular incident occurred or was a mere fantasy on her part.) Awilda's partner, Carlos Lopez (himself also a regular user of drugs), is also known to have repeatedly physically abused and neglected Elisa and her two older siblings.

== Murder ==
On November 15, Carlos Lopez was jailed in relation to a violation of parole. Seven days later, on the evening of November 22, Awilda phoned one of her sisters, Mercy Torres, to report that Elisa was "like retarded on the bed", with fluid (later determined to be brain fluid) leaking from her nose and mouth. In addition, Lopez informed her sister that Elisa would not eat or drink. (Note: At Awilda Lopez's subsequent trial, she would confess to having thrown Elisa into a cement surface on November 20 before leaving her "unconscious and drooling" on a bed for two days before attempting to find or provide any form of assistance for her daughter.) When Mrs. Torres insisted Awilda take Elisa to the hospital, Awilda replied she would "think about it" after she had finished cleaning the dishes. The following morning, Awilda contacted a neighbor, whom she invited to view Elisa's lifeless body. Upon being unable to locate signs of life, this neighbor told Awilda to call the police, which she refused to do. In response, this neighbor immediately called police and an ambulance as Awilda threatened to commit suicide. (Note: When Awilda was unable to dissuade this neighbor from notifying authorities of her daughter's murder, she ran to the roof of her apartment building, threatening to jump to her death. Police would successfully deter her from jumping from the building.)

In custody, Awilda initially confessed to having thrown Elisa head-first into a concrete wall two days prior to her contacting her neighbor, adding that Elisa had neither talked nor walked after this incident. A subsequent autopsy revealed numerous injuries including broken fingers (one bone of which was protruding through the skin), a broken toe, damage to internal organs, and deep welts and burns across her head, face and body. In addition, her genitalia and rectum also bore evidence of trauma, including tearing. Thirty circular marks upon her body were found to be impressions left by the stone in the ring of the individual who had struck Elisa. Forensically, it was proven that the injuries had been sustained over a prolonged period of time. (Note: In an April 1996 interview granted to television talk show host Rolonda Watts, Awilda Lopez would deny inflicting any severe form of mental or physical abuse upon Elisa, and categorically denied even tentatively torturing her child. She insisted police had forced her to confess to these acts of cruelty, insisting she had never subjected Elisa to any abuse beyond occasionally "hitting her" or "spanking her" on the backside.)

External images
- Elisa's grave at Cypress Hills Cemetery
- Elisa's casket prior to interment at Cypress Hills Cemetery

=== Funeral ===
Elisa Izquierdo's funeral was held on November 29, 1995. The service was officiated by the Reverend Gianni Agostinelli, who informed the estimated 300 mourners in attendance that Elisa had been murdered not only by her own mother, but by the "silence of many, by the neglect of child-welfare institutions and the moral mediocrity that has intoxicated our neighborhoods".

Prior to Elisa's burial, a wake was held. Those present at Elisa's wake and funeral included relatives, neighbors, politicians, Prince Michael of Greece, and members of the public touched by the case.

Elisa's casket remained open throughout the ceremony. The extensive damage inflicted to her face and neck was heavily concealed via funeral cosmetology. Elisa wore a crown of white flowers on her head, a single red rose was placed in her hand, and her coffin was adorned with white flowers. A Barbie doll given to Elisa by her father which she is known to have cherished was placed alongside her body. Many mourners placed additional flowers, toys, stuffed animals and notes of sympathy in and upon her coffin prior to her casket being closed and her burial at Cypress Hills Cemetery. Elisa's gravestone bears a plaque, with the inscription reading: "World please watch over the children."

== Sentencing ==
=== Awilda Lopez ===
On June 25, 1996, Awilda Lopez pleaded guilty to the second-degree murder of her daughter in a hearing held before Judge Alvin Schlesinger at the New York's State Supreme Court. Upon the advice of her attorney, Daniel Ollen, she pleaded guilty to this deal offered by the prosecution team with the knowledge she would become eligible for parole after serving 15 years' imprisonment. (Note: Following this hearing, District Attorney Robert Morgenthau informed the media that one of the reasons the prosecution team had chosen to offer Lopez the opportunity to plead guilty to the reduced charge of the second-degree murder of Elisa was that had this case gone to trial, two of Elisa's siblings (aged eight and nine) would likely have had to deliver testimony against their mother, and the prosecution wished to spare these children any additional distress this experience would likely have caused them.)

The following month, Judge Schlesinger sentenced Awilda Lopez to a term of 15 years to life imprisonment. Prior to formal sentencing, Schlesinger openly criticized the child welfare system within New York, stating: "We have not created procedures to do everything necessary to protect the young and vulnerable in this society. The system has failed to protect our babies, and don't tell me how much it costs. If anything [good comes from] this horrendous tragedy, it will be that we give priority to these babies."

Awilda Lopez initially became eligible for parole in 2010; she was denied parole in January 2022, but released from the medium security Taconic Correctional Facility on April 19, 2022.

=== Carlos Lopez ===
On October 29, 1996, Elisa's stepfather, Carlos Lopez, was sentenced to serve between one-and-a-half and three years in prison, to run consecutive with the sentence he was serving at the time of Elisa's death. This sentence was in relation to one specific instance of physical abuse dating from October 31, 1995, in which he had repeatedly banged Elisa's head against a concrete wall in the presence of her siblings. (Note: Lopez is also believed to have repeatedly thrown Elisa into the ocean while on a trip to Brooklyn, but was never prosecuted for these instances of cruelty.)

Although Carlos Lopez pleaded guilty to this charge of attempted second-degree assault, claiming he had not actually assaulted Elisa, but had opted to do so to spare his children the emotional trauma of having to testify against him, Judge Schlesinger rejected this claim outright, adding that the prosecution team had largely chosen to charge Lopez with this charge to spare Elisa's siblings any further psychological or emotional trauma.

== Aftermath ==
=== Public outrage ===
The public outrage at Elisa's death was fueled by revelations that despite Awilda Lopez's evident and spiraling drug addiction and the obvious and increasing signs of the ongoing abuse Elisa was suffering at the hands of her mother and stepfather, not only had a judge awarded custody of the child to her mother in 1994 in spite of protestations from her family and school, but numerous instances of concerns for Elisa's safety reported to child welfare agencies such as the Manhattan Child Welfare Authorities by various individuals since that date had ultimately failed to remove Elisa from the custody of her mother.

Following Elisa's death and subsequent public funeral, her life story became the subject of numerous local and national media articles, from local tabloids such as the New York Daily News and The New York Post to her story being given front-page coverage of the December 11, 1995 edition of Time Magazine under the title "A Shameful Death". Elisa's story was also featured on an August 1996 episode of Dateline NBC. Much of the media coverage devoted to this case was openly scathing of New York's child welfare agencies. (Note: According to statistics, between 1988 and 1993, the number of reported cases of child abuse cases within New York City rose by 25 percent, although simultaneous budget cuts had reduced the number of caseworkers required to efficiently oversee this increasing number of cases.)

=== Judge Phoebe Greenbaum ===
Following Elisa's death, Judge Greenbaum was subjected to severe criticism regarding her 1994 decision to award custody of Elisa to Awilda Lopez as opposed to Elsa Canizares. Greenbaum responded to this criticism by claiming she had been merely following procedural recommendations when she had made her custodial decision. In response to this claim, then-Mayor of New York City Rudy Giuliani would state to the media: "The judge ultimately makes the decision, based on all the facts and records, and is supposed to go behind those things [to] make determinations."

=== Resulting legislation ===
In response to the death of Elisa Izquierdo, the then-Mayor of New York City, Rudolph Giuliani, instigated an urgent review of the city's child welfare system. This review inspired the creation of the Administration for Children's Services—an agency solely devoted to the issue of child welfare in New York. (Note: A major deciding factor in the decision to legislate Elisa's Law had been a general and collective frustration experienced by both law enforcement and advocacy personnel when child welfare agencies had repeatedly cited then-existing confidentiality procedures as a justification as to their refusal to answer any probing questions regarding their collective role in Elisa's death.)

On February 12, 1996, Governor George Pataki formally signed Elisa's Law into legislation. This legislation, named in Elisa's honor, was signed into law in the presence of several relatives of Elisa, plus numerous social workers and school teachers who had all attempted to intervene and/or inform child welfare authorities in their collective efforts to prevent the child being with or remaining in the awarded custody of her mother.

Elisa's Law is designed to balance the need for increased accountability through public awareness and government oversight with the privacy interests of individuals involved in child protective services cases—particularly with regards to the deaths of children previously reported to child welfare services as suffering any form of neglect or abuse. All reports pertaining to the deaths of children resulting from child abuse available for public scrutiny do not name the actual deceased child or children, or the actual caseworker(s) assigned to investigate reports of suspected child abuse or neglect relating to the deceased child or children in question; however, these reports do list each and every complaint and/or report submitted relating to the child or children, and the agency's actual response. In addition, these public records contain an assessment detailing whether or not the agency's overall response had been adequate.

Elisa's Law continues to hold the child welfare agency of New York City and the Administration for Children's Services (ACS) publicly accountable for its performance.

=== Siblings ===
Elisa Izquierdo's five siblings were raised in separate foster homes. Reportedly, all suffered acute psychological trauma due to the acts of extreme physical, mental, and sexual abuse they had been forced to witness inflicted upon their sister.

== Media ==
=== Literature ===
- Douglas, John; Olshaker, Mark (1997). Journey Into Darkness: The FBI's Premier Investigator Penetrates the Minds and Motives of the Most Terrifying Serial Killers. New York City: Pocket Books. ISBN 978-1-439-19981-7.

=== Television ===
- Television talk show host Rolonda Watts conducted an interview with Awilda Lopez prior to her June 1996 sentencing as part of her eponymous Rolonda daytime talk show series. Commissioned by King World Productions, this interview was incorporated into a 45-minute episode, titled Little Lost Girl: The Life and Death of Elisa Izquierdo and was broadcast in April 1996.

== See also ==
- Child abuse
- Child sexual abuse
- Filicide
- Psychological abuse
- Physical abuse
- Sexual abuse

== Cited works and further reading ==
- Bilchik, Shay (1997). Child Abuse: Guide to Investigating Child Abuse. Diane Publishing Company. ISBN 978-0-788-17633-3.
- Delattre, Edwin (2011). Character and Cops: Ethics in Policing. AEI Press. ISBN 978-0-844-77226-4.
- Douglas, John; Olshaker, Mark (1997). Journey Into Darkness: The FBI's Premier Investigator Penetrates the Minds and Motives of the Most Terrifying Serial Killers. Pocket Books. ISBN 978-1-439-19981-7
- Eckel, David M.; Herling, Bradley L. (2011). Deliver Us From Evil: Boston University Studies in Philosophy and Religion. Continuum International Publishing Group. ISBN 978-1-441-11641-3.
- Fisch, Mark (1996). Criminology 1997/1998. McGraw-Hill Higher Education. ISBN 978-0-697-35421-1
- Meyer, Cheryl; Oberman, Michelle; White, Kelly (2011). Mothers who Kill Their Children. New York University Press. ISBN 978-0-814-75643-0.
- Roberts, Dorothy (2009). Shattered Bonds: The Color Of Child Welfare. Basic Books. ISBN 978-0-786-73064-3
- Waldfogel, Jane (2001). The Future of Child Protection: How to Break the Cycle of Abuse and Neglect. Harvard University Press. ISBN 978-0-674-00723-9
- Warner, Joanne (2015). The Emotional Politics of Social Work and Child Protection. Policy Press. ISBN 978-1-447-31843-9.
