= Animal Planet (disambiguation) =

Animal Planet is an American cable channel. It may also refer to:

== TV channels ==
Regional

- Animal Planet (European TV channel)
- Animal Planet Nordic
- Animal Planet (Southeast Asia)

Country-specific

- Animal Planet (Australia and New Zealand)
- Animal Planet (British TV channel)
- Animal Planet (Dutch TV channel)
- Animal Planet (German TV channel)
- Animal Planet (Indian TV channel)
- Animal Planet (Italian TV channel)
- Animal Planet (Polish TV channel)
- CTV Wild Channel, formerly Animal Planet Canada

== Others ==
- Animal Planet Heroes, an "umbrella rotation" of reality shows on Animal Planet
- Animal Planet Live was a live stage show, at the two Universal theme parks, and was inspired by the TV channel Animal Planet
- Animal Planet Report was a reality television series about reports on animals all over the United States
- Animal Planet Zooventure, an American children's television game show
- Doraemon: Nobita and the Animal Planet, a 1990 Japanese animated film
- Animal Planet (video game), a 1996 video game from Discovery Channel Multimedia

== See also ==
- Doraemon: Nobita and the Animal Planet, a feature-length Doraemon film
