= Animal Planet Heroes =

Animal Planet Heroes is an "umbrella rotation" of reality shows on Animal Planet. These shows focus on various animal cops / animal protection agencies across the United States, with one show set in South Africa. The shows include:

- Animal Cops: Phoenix
- Miami Animal Police
- Animal Cops: Miami
- Animal Cops: Houston
- Animal Cops: Detroit
- Animal Cops: San Francisco
- Animal Precinct
- Animal Cops: South Africa
- Animal Cops: Philadelphia
