= Humber Rescue =

Search and rescue service in the East Riding of Yorkshire, England

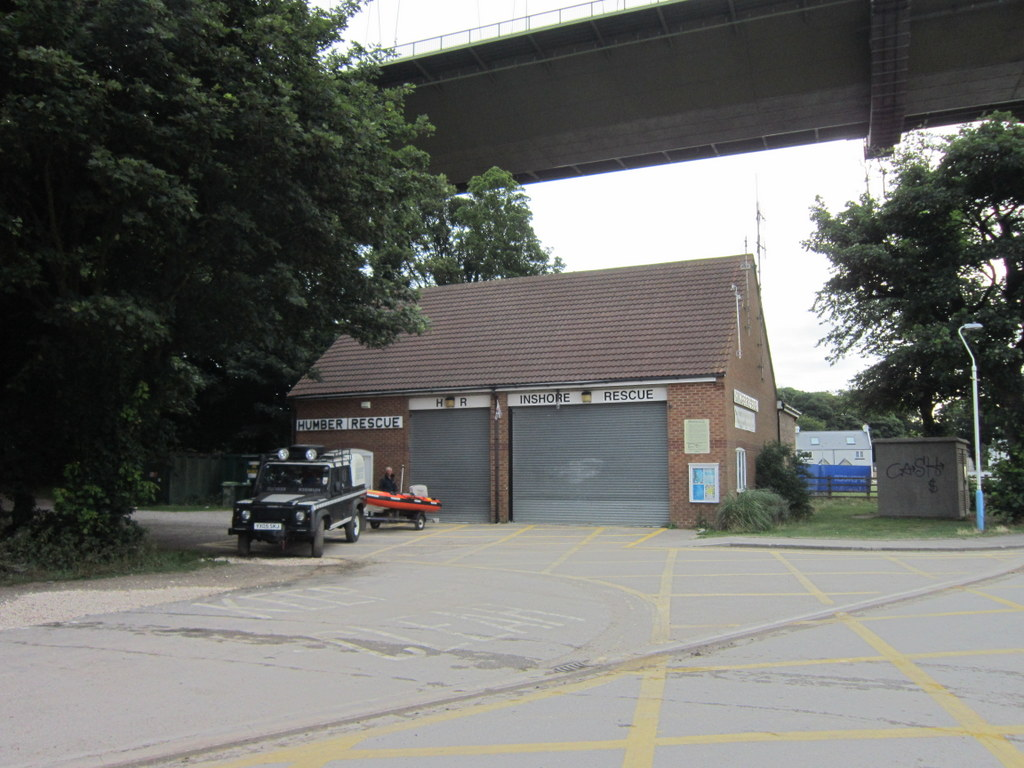
- Humber Rescue, Cliff Road, Hessle

- Location within East Riding of Yorkshire

General information
- Type: Lifeboat Station
- Location: Cliff Road, Hessle, East Riding of Yorkshire, HU13 0HE, United Kingdom
- Coordinates: 53°42′52.7″N 0°27′04.2″W
- Opened: April 1990
- Inaugurated: 1989
- Owner: Paul Berriff

Website
- humber-rescue.co.uk

Humber Rescue is located in the shadow of the Humber Bridge, on Cliff Road in Hessle, a town 5 miles (8.0 km) west of Hull, on the north shore of the River Humber estuary, in the East Riding of Yorkshire, England

Founded by British filmmaker Paul Berriff, the independent search and rescue (SAR) service was established in 1989 and operational from April 1990.

Humber Rescue currently operates a 9 m (30 ft) MST-900W SAR Rigid inflatable boat, Humber Rescue, on station since 2020, and a smaller D-class (IB1) Inshore lifeboat, Sue Roberts, on station since 2023.

Humber Rescue is a registered charity (No. 702278), has 'Declared Facility' status with H.M. Coastguard, and a member of the National Independent Lifeboats Association (NILA).

== History ==
The history of Humber Rescue effectively dates back to 1952, when as a young boy, Paul Berriff was inspired when he witnessed the attempted rescue of the crew of an aircraft, by the Whitby lifeboat. In his career as a TV Documentary maker, he would later record the rescues of the Bridlington lifeboat. During his spare time, he volunteered as a coastguard. However, it was during filming a documentary about the Humber Bridge, that he saw the need for a rescue service in the area.

In 1989, Berriff set up a station at his home on Woodfield Lane in Hessle, and recruited 10 people as crew. But it was a crew with no lifeboat. However, a Mayday appeal on Radio Humberside and in the Hull Daily Mail raised sufficient funds to purchase a boat, trailer and launch vehicle. Humber Rescue was operational in April 1990. The first call was just two days after the boat was delivered, and 27 incidents were attended in the first nine months.

Better facilities were soon needed, and by 1995, Humber Rescue were operating from a station building constructed on Cliff Road, underneath the north end of the Humber Bridge. With 106 calls, 2005 was the busiest year on record to that date. 105 call outs in 2006 brought the total to 1000 since the service began.

One notable rescue came on Fri 17 May 2002, when Panavia Tornado GR4 ZA599 of No. 13 Squadron RAF based at RAF Marham in Norfolk suffered catastrophic failure, and crashed into the north bank of the Humber at Brough. Both crew members managed to eject, landing in the river. One man in a dinghy was rescued by RAF Westland Sea King XZ593, and the other, who was drifting down river without a dinghy, was picked by Humber Rescue.

Humber Rescue currently averages 110 calls per year, making it the busiest Independent rescue service, and in 2023, the 7th busiest lifeboat station in the country.

== Area of operation ==
Humber Rescue covers the Humber estuary downstream as far as Cleethorpes, and upstream into the tributary rivers of the River Trent to Gainsborough, the River Aire, and the River Ouse to Naburn Lock, an area of 210 square miles (540 km^{2}).

== Paul Berriff ==
Paul Berriff started his career at 16 as a press photographer for the Yorkshire Evening Post in Leeds. By the age of 21, he was the youngest BBC News cameraman. Later, as a documentary film maker, he has created, produced and directed over 180 prime time network documentary films and series, receiving numerous awards and BAFTAs. During his work, he has also jumped from a sinking ship, been involved in a helicopter crash in the Cairngorms, and was on scene at the Piper Alpha oil platform disaster. On 11 September 2001, he was knocked unconscious by debris from the Twin Towers, whilst filming with the FDNY assistant Chief Fire Commissioner.

While filming the TV series Rescue, Berriff was involved in saving a young man off the coast of Scotland, and was subsequently awarded the Queens Commendation for Bravery, the Royal Humane Society Silver Medal for Bravery, and the Silk Cut Awards – Individual Rescue Award.

Then, in his spare time, he established Humber Rescue in 1989. In 2016, he was awarded the OBE for Services to Maritime Search & Rescue.

== Station honours ==
The following are awards made at Humber Rescue.

- Officer, Order of the British Empire (OBE)

Paul Berriff – 2016QBH

- The Queen's Award for Voluntary Service

Humber rescue – 2011

== Humber Rescue Equipment ==
=== Lifeboats ===
Name	On station	Class	Comments
Olive Hunt	1998–	8.5 m (28 ft) Tornado RIB	Backup lifeboat since 2020
Humber Rescue	2020–	MST-900W SAR RIB	
Sue Roberts	2023–	RNLI D-class (IB1)	Previously Myrtle and Trevor Gurr (D-704) at Cardigan

=== Launch Tractor ===
Class	On station	Comments
Zetor Proxima CL 110	2021–	

== See also ==
- Independent lifeboats in Britain and Ireland
