= Paul Beeson =

British cinematographer

Paul Beeson, B.S.C.
- Born: 16 November 1921; Hammersmith, London, England, United Kingdom
- Died: 19 July 2001 (aged 79); Gerrard's Cross, Buckinghamshire, England, United Kingdom
- Occupation: Cinematographer
- Years active: 1938–1996

Paul Beeson, B.S.C. (16 November 1921 – 19 July 2001) was a British cinematographer. He was initially at Ealing Studios before going on to work on films for various other companies. He worked on over 300 feature films, including 74 where he was director of photography.

Beeson was the cameraman who filmed the iconic The Sound of Music opening scene of Julie Andrews from a helicopter.

== Biography ==
Beeson was born on 16 November 1921 to Leslie Frank Beeson and his Italian heritage wife, Paul was given the 2nd name Antonio. As a teenager he gained a passion for photography. While still studying at Cranleigh School, his father managed find him an opportunity as a trainee at Ealing Studios, then known as Associated Talking Pictures. His first film was during 1937 for the George Formby film, I See Ice, where he worked with Anthony Kimmins.

During World War II, Beeson was drafted into the Royal Navy's Fleet Air Arm in 1941. He transferred to the naval film unit and became an official naval photographer, again with Kimmins. Beeson landed at Normandy with BBC correspondent Howard Marshall. During his time with the navy, he met his wife, Olga, who was a member of the Women's Royal Naval Service.

After the war, Beeson returned to Ealing Studios, becoming a camera operator for the film Against the Wind in 1947. He was director of photography in the film West of Zanzibar (1954).

Beeson stayed with Ealing Studios for 19 years, before going freelance. He would act as a cameraman on over 300 films, 74 of which he acted as director of photography, working with directors such as Robert Zemeckis on Who Framed Roger Rabbit, Ron Howard on Willow, Alfred Hitchcock on Under Capricorn and Steven Spielberg on the Indiana Jones trilogy. Beeson was the cameraman for the opening shot of The Sound of Music, shooting Julie Andrews' iconic title song from a helicopter.

Beeson would receive awards for his long service to the film industry including the John Alcott award from British Society of Cinematographers, where he had served as president and was its longest serving member, as well as the David Lenham award from Guild of British Camera Technicians. Beeson died on 19 July 2001.

== Bibliography ==
- Perry, George. Forever Ealing: A Celebration of the Great British Film Studio. Pavilion, 1981.
