= ITV Anglia =

East of England branch for ITV

- Logo used since 2013

- Type: Region of television network
- Branding: ITV1
- Country: United Kingdom
- First air date: 27 October 1959 (67 years ago)
- TV transmitters: Sandy Heath, Sudbury, Tacolneston (formerly Belmont, Mendlesham)
- Headquarters: Anglia House, Norwich
- Broadcast area: East of England
- Owner: ITV plc
- Dissolved: lost on-air identity on 27 October 2002 (now known as ITV at all times)
- Former names: Anglia Television
- Picture format: 1080i HDTV, downscaled to 16:9 576i for SDTV
- Affiliation: ITV
- Official website: itv.com/anglia
- Language: English
- Subsidiary: Anglia Television Entertainment

ITV Anglia, previously known as Anglia Television, is the ITV franchise holder for the East of England. The station is based at Anglia House in Norwich, with regional news bureaux in Cambridge and Northampton. ITV Anglia is owned and operated by ITV plc under the licence name of ITV Broadcasting Limited.

ITV Anglia broadcasts to Norfolk, Suffolk, Essex, Cambridgeshire, Northamptonshire, Bedfordshire, northern Hertfordshire, northern Buckinghamshire and the southeastern fringes of Lincolnshire and Leicestershire. Its principal programme nowadays is ITV News Anglia which is split into two regional editions, both airing at 18:00 on weekdays and various times at weekends.

== History ==
Anglia Television launched on 27 October 1959 as an independent company serving the East of England, the eleventh ITA station to go on air. At its launch, Anglia broadcast from the Mendlesham Transmitter and was soon joined by Sandy Heath and then Belmont. Under the chairmanship of Aubrey Buxton the station soon established a reputation for producing excellent drama, through a deal with the then-franchise holder for London, Associated-Rediffusion. Anglia also established the long-running nature documentary series Survival. During the early 1960s, it looked towards the unserved portion of south-east England, which was to be served by a transmitter at Dover, as a logical extension to its eastern bailiwick – however, the ITA decided to hand this part of the country to Southern Television instead.

In 1973, the IBA planned to transfer the Belmont transmitter, which served Lincolnshire, eastern Yorkshire, northern Norfolk and eastern Nottinghamshire, away from Anglia to Yorkshire Television. The public protested against such a move, especially in parts of north Norfolk. Anglia decided not to publicly fight the IBA plans, after a board member had agreed to produce a film for the IBA explaining why Anglia should be allowed to keep hold of the Belmont transmitter. On 30 July 1974, the transmitter was transferred; due to this change, Anglia's profits were reduced from £2.2 million to £1.29 million. However, by 1976 Anglia had managed to improve its operations, posting results of £1.47 million. Anglia described the improvement as "satisfactory", and its prospects were considered "encouraging".

In 1975, the technicians' union (ACTT) criticised Anglia over the amount of regional programming being produced at the station, stating it had been dramatically decreasing since 1970 to just five hours per week. The concerns were raised to the IBA, who they believed would be able to construe the rapid decline in programming as the failure of Anglia to not fully commit to its obligations for the franchise area.

In December 1976, Anglia dropped the Thames children's series Pauline's Quirkes as it believed it was insufficiently entertaining for its young audience. The company denied the move was due to the high volume of complaints about the content of the series. Thames said it was "surprised" at the decision, as the programme had rated well.

In the autumn of 1977, a commercial Dutch television company was recording Anglia television signals and transmitting its English programmes, including Granada's Coronation Street and its own Survival, to its viewers in Amsterdam. The Dutch government did not believe it was a violation of Dutch copyright law – EBU legal advisers held discussions about to how resolve the matter.

In 1979, a survey carried out by the IBA highlighted Anglia as one of the best-known ITV companies – Anglia claimed that this was a testament to the strength of its commitment to a prominent local and national identity.

=== 1980s ===
In 1980, Anglia successfully retained the franchise after defeating a challenge from East of England TV, who wished to operate from Cambridge. In addition, the IBA bowed to public pressure from 70,000 viewers in northern parts of Norfolk who were served by Yorkshire Television via the Belmont Transmitter; many of the viewers had gone to "considerable trouble and expense" to receive Anglia Television. Three new low powered relay stations were built, allowing easier access to Anglia transmissions.

Anglia was one of the first ITV companies to begin 24-hour transmission, launching a full overnight service in August 1987.

=== 1990s to present ===
On 9 July 1990, About Anglia was replaced by a new dual news service, with both editions of Anglia News broadcast from Norwich (long before this became standard practice in other ITV regions). Journalists were also based at seven regional newsrooms and a Westminster bureau. Anglia began providing separate news services for the East and West of the Anglia region. The two services were replaced with a single pan-regional service in February 2009 as part of major cutbacks to ITV's regional news output but have latterly been restored as ITV News Anglia.

Anglia retained its franchise at the 1991 ITV franchise auctions. In 1993, Anglia forged a partnership with American pay-TV network HBO, owned by Time Warner (now Warner Bros. Discovery). Under this arrangement, Anglia acquired half-ownership in Citadel, an HBO production subsidiary; Time Warner subsequently acquired 50 percent of ITEL (International Television Enterprises Limited), Anglia's distribution unit. In addition, a new company was formed: Anglia Television Entertainment, 51% owned by Anglia and 49% owned by HBO. On 15 November, ATE entered into a joint-venture with Brian Cosgrove and Mark Hall to form Cosgrove Hall Films, a restructuring of their previous studio Cosgrove Hall Productions which went dormant following owners Thames Television's loss of their ITV franchise. ATE would handle 75% ownership while ITEL would handle the international distribution, while animation production would remain at the studio's longtime home of Manchester.

In early 1994, Anglia Television was bought by MAI (owners of Meridian Broadcasting), who merged with United Newspapers to form United News and Media, eventually being joined by HTV in 1996. In November 1999, UN&M purchased out HBO's stake in ITEL, making it a fully owned subsidiary.

Following United's aborted merger attempt with Carlton Communications, Granada plc bought Anglia and Meridian, whilst selling off HTV (not including its studios) to Carlton. After the sale was complete, ITEL's assets were merged and folded into Granada Media's distribution arm.

In 2004, Granada finally merged with Carlton to form ITV plc, which ended Anglia Television's existence as a separate brand. During its period of UBM ownership, a 'youth' channel was launched to cable and satellite from Anglia Television's facilities, Rapture TV; some productions for the ITV network were also shared with Rapture, which was retained by UBM after the sale to Granada, but later closed down and its assets sold. Many early programmes for the newly launched Channel 5 were made at Anglia Television, as UBM also owned a stake in the channel (later sold to RTL Group).

Anglia Television no longer makes a significant content contribution to ITV nationally (the last major programme being Trisha, before it moved to Channel 5) and the semi-independent Anglia Factual brand, which supplied content for Discovery Channel in the USA, Channel 4 and Channel 5 in the UK and other broadcasters worldwide, was closed in January 2012 with any returning series re-allocated to either the London or Manchester factual departments. Notable series included Animal Precinct and Animal Cops for Animal Planet, Monkey Kingdom for Channel 5 and Real Crime and Survival with Ray Mears for ITV (credited as ITV Studios). Commercial Breaks, the now-defunct commercial production agency owned by ITV's sales division, was also based in Norwich.

In 2006, ITV plc swapped subsidiaries, which involved renaming Anglia Television Limited as ITV Broadcasting Limited and vice versa. However, due to Ofcom licensing regulation, the new Anglia Television Limited could not take up the franchise, which meant that the East Anglia franchise was effectively transferred to ITV Broadcasting Limited. All other franchises then owned by ITV plc were transferred to ITV Broadcasting Limited in December 2008. Thus, technically the former Anglia Television Limited (as ITV Broadcasting Limited) now holds all eleven regional ITV licences in England, Wales and southern Scotland; the other three ITV plc-owned licensees, Channel Television Limited, ITV Breakfast Limited and UTV Limited, were acquired after 2008. Until 28 March 2017, Anglia Television Limited was listed on www.companieshouse.gov.uk as a private owned company.

== Studios ==
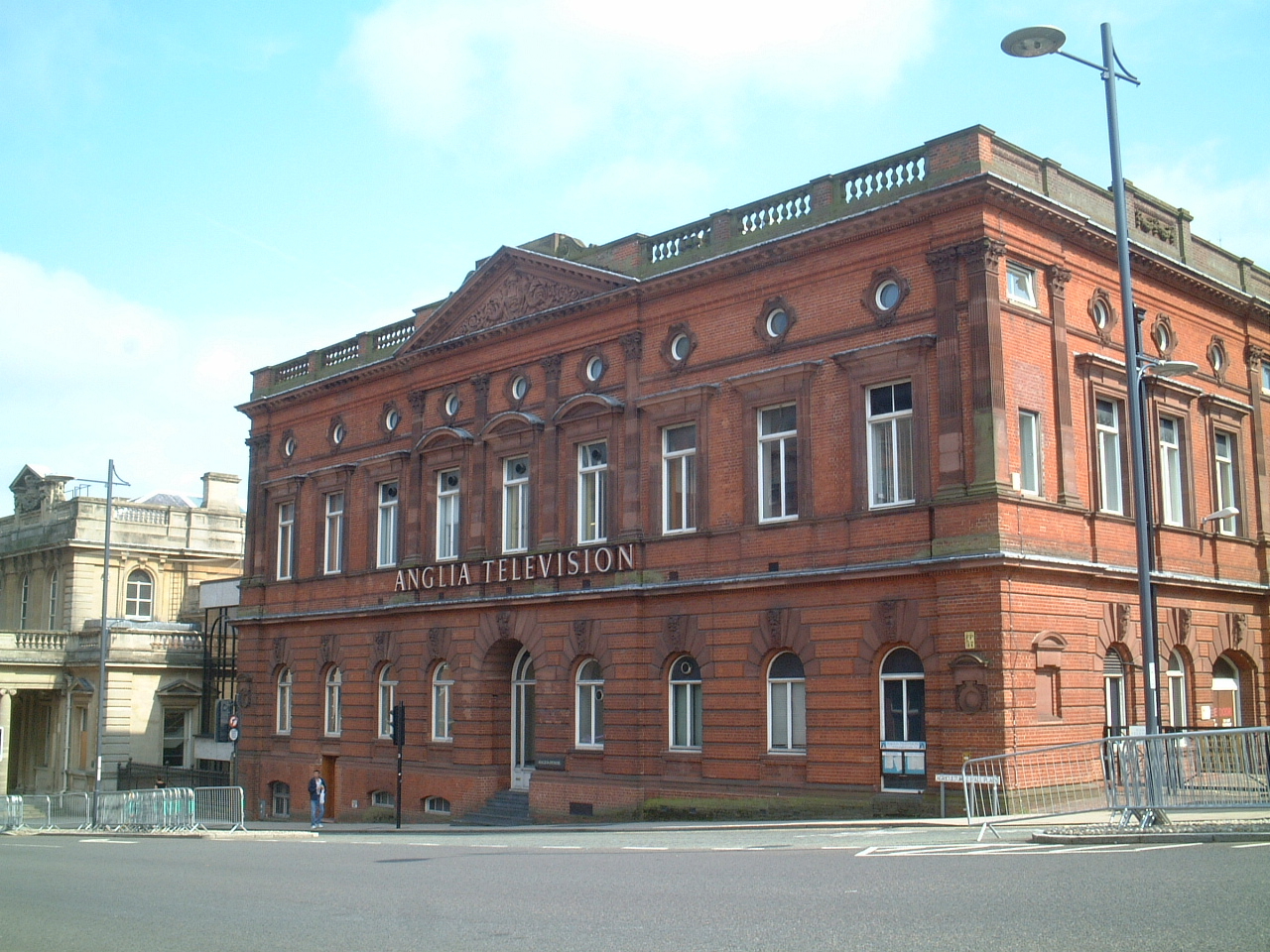
Anglia House, Anglia Television's headquarters on Agricultural Hall Plain in Norwich

Throughout Anglia's existence, the company has retained its headquarters at Anglia House in Norwich, which contains four studios and offices for the company. As Anglia's production grew the company also expanded, buying a former bowling alley in Magdalen Street in the late 1970s and creating a further studio, referred to as 'Studio E'. While larger productions moved here, as did the news service in 1999, some smaller productions (such as regional programmes) continued at Anglia House.

In recent years though, and especially since the formation of ITV plc, the need for studio space has become unnecessary. In 2006, Anglia sold its Magdalen Street studio complex (which included its newsroom and twin news studios) to Norfolk County Council, which, with the help of the East of England Development Agency, created EPIC – the East of England Production Innovation Centre. Intended as an "incubator" for small creative and media enterprises, Studio E (formerly home to Trisha) is now available for hire as an independent facility. One of the first tenants of EPIC was Televirtual, a company formed out of Broadsword Productions, which made Anglia's popular children's show Knightmare. A major education partner at EPIC is the Norwich School of Art and Design, which has based its Foundation Degree in Film and Video at the centre since September 2007. As a consequence of the sale, Anglia News moved back to a new state-of-the-art facility at Anglia House.

== Identity ==
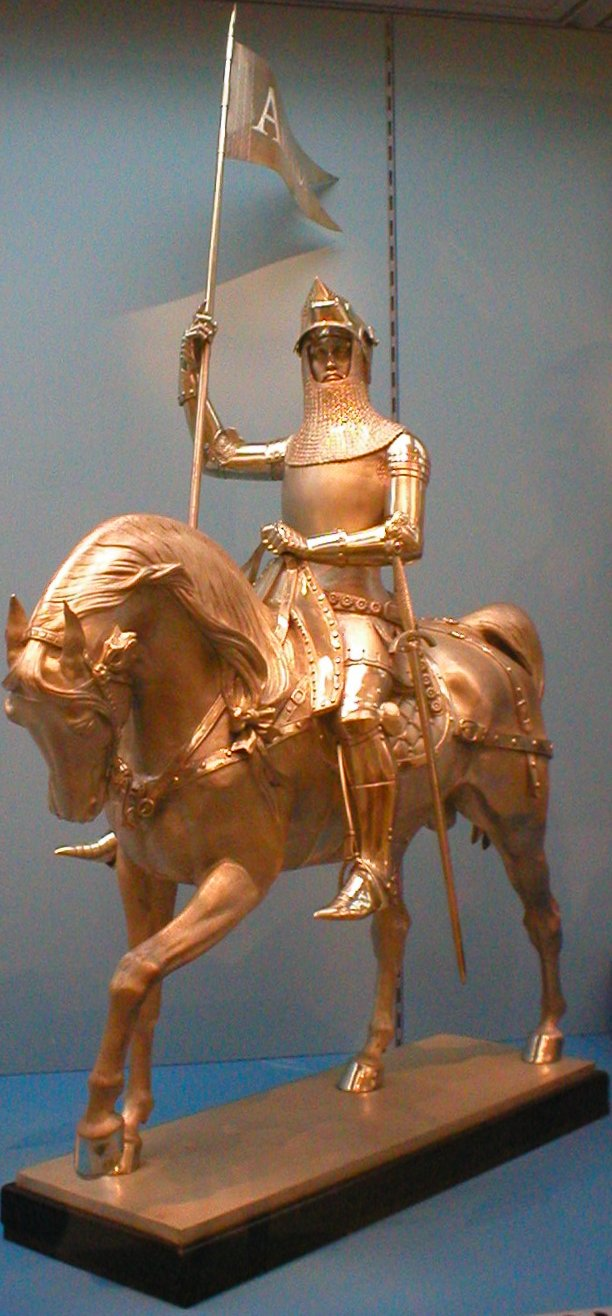
The Anglia knight, used from 1959 to 1988.

Anglia's original ident was the Anglia knight, a silver statue of a knight on horseback. At the end, the camera zoomed in on the pennon atop the knight's lance, which showed the station's name. An arrangement by Malcolm Sargent, of the Alla Hornpipe movement of Handel's Water Music was played over the film. The Anglia knight logo became so closely identified with the station that when Anglia produced a book to mark its fortieth anniversary in 1999, it was entitled A Knight On The Box. Before the ident, the channel's start-up music was Ralph Vaughan Williams' Sea Songs, which was used from 1959 until the early 1980s. With the introduction of colour television on ITV in November 1969 (although not in the Anglia region until October 1970), the ident was remade with constant lighting, and the knight constantly rotating on a turntable – a longer version of the ident was used at the start of the day's transmission until the mid 1980s.

The Anglia 'A' logo introduced in March 1988.

On Monday 21 March 1988, the knight was replaced by a new identity a quasi-heraldic stylised 'A' made of triangles, designed by Robinson Lambie-Nairn at a cost of £500,000. The ident was accompanied by a deep sombre jingle composed by Nic Rowley and remained in use until 8 November 1999, when (along with most other ITV companies), Anglia took the Hearts idents, which featured the stylised "A" – though in a square rather than a flag – and were used until 2002.

On 28 October 2002, Anglia lost its on-screen identity in favour of the ITV1 brand, with regional idents only before regional programming. This regional ident featured the Anglia name below the ITV1 logo against a blue background covering half of the screen, with a celebrity covering the other half. The Anglia logo could still be seen on screen as part of the news service and on the purple end boards used by the Granada companies introduced in 2001. In 2004, with all English and Welsh-based companies now owned by ITV plc, the station lost its separate identity. The station was officially branded as ITV Anglia, and the stylised 'A' logo was dropped as the company logo, with the on-screen name used less and less, and dropped entirely by 2006.

== Programmes ==
Much of Anglia's back catalogue is now held and preserved at the East Anglian Film Archive. A number of Anglia Television's productions including The Way We Were, Bygones and Anglia At War have been released on DVD. A compilation of the first years of Anglia TV's local news, Here Was the News was also released in 2009.

Some of Anglia's best-known programmes were:

- Survival (1961–2001)
- Bygones (1967–89)
- Sale of the Century (1971–83)
- Gambit (1975–85, 1995)
- Backs to the Land (1977–78)
- Tales of the Unexpected (1979–88)
- Birthday Club (1980–2002)
- Miss Morison's Ghosts (1981)
- Ten adaptations of the Adam Dalgliesh novels of P. D. James (1983–98)
- The Zodiac Game (1984–85)
- Marjorie and Men (1985)
- Inside Story (1986)
- A Killing on the Exchange (1987)
- Cause Célèbre (1987)
- Knightmare (1987–94)
- Menace Unseen (1988)
- Lucky Ladders (1988–1993)
- A Quiet Conspiracy (1989)
- Anything More Would Be Greedy (1989)
- Goldeneye (1989)
- The Chief (1990–95)
- Jumble (1991–92)
- Chimera (1991)
- Growing Rich (1992)
- A Dangerous Man: Lawrence After Arabia (1992)
- Framed (1992)
- Jilly Cooper's Riders (1993)
- My Good Friend (1995–96)
- Jilly Cooper's The Man Who Made Husbands Jealous (1997)
- Bring Me the Head of Light Entertainment (1997–2000)
- Where the Heart Is (1997–2001)
- Touching Evil (1997–99)
- Ain't Misbehavin' (1997)
- Trisha (1998–2004)
- Animal Cops (2002–2018)
- A Line in the Sand (2004)

== See also ==
- ITV (TV channel)
- ITV plc
- ITV London
- ITV Central
- ITV Yorkshire
- East Anglia

== Further information ==
- A Knight On The Box, ISBN 0-906836-40-9

ITV regional service
New service as Anglia Television	Lincolnshire, East Yorkshire & North Norfolk coast 20 December 1965 – 31 December 1973	Succeeded by Yorkshire Television
New service as Anglia Television	East of England; 27 October 1959 – present	Current provider as ITV Anglia
Preceded by Yorkshire Television	North Norfolk coast 25 January 1980 – present	Current provider as ITV Anglia
