= ASPCA Humane Law Enforcement Division =

Animal law enforcement division, 1866–2013

- Common name: ASPCA Law Enforcement

Agency overview
- Formed: 1866
- Dissolved: 2013

Jurisdictional structure
- Operations jurisdiction: New York, New York, USA
- Area: 1,214.4 km²
- Population: 8,274,527
- Legal jurisdiction: New York
- General nature: Civilian police

Operational structure
- Agents: 20
- Parent agency: American Society for the Prevention of Cruelty to Animals

Website
- www.aspca.org

The ASPCA Humane Law Enforcement Division (colloquially, "ASPCA Law Enforcement") was the law enforcement arm of the American Society for the Prevention of Cruelty to Animals (ASPCA) from 1866 until 2013, when the law enforcement division was disbanded. The agency enforced humane laws, and investigated cases of animal cruelty.

== Agency history ==
The American Society for the Prevention of Cruelty to Animals (ASPCA) was incorporated in 1866 by a special state legislation to prevent animal cruelty through various programs including animal adoption services, animal education programs and an armed law enforcement division.

The Humane Law Enforcement Division was a branch of the ASPCA staffed by 20 armed New York State peace officers who responded to reports of animal cruelty in marked ASPCA patrol cars in the New York City area as well as perform undercover operations. The officers were empowered through NYS Criminal Procedure Law and NY Agriculture and Markets laws to investigate allegations of animal abuse, seize animals being abused, and make arrests for the prosecution for animal cruelty.

In 2000, the ASPCA Humane Law Enforcement Division received 33,000 calls for service which resulted in 55 arrests, 30 summonses being issued, and 537 animal seizures.

== Disbandment ==
In December 2013, the president of the ASPCA stated that the Law Enforcement Division would be disbanding and the enforcement of humane laws and response to calls for animal abuse and cruelty would become the responsibility of the NYPD. By early January 2014, half of the officers of the division had been terminated. The reason given for disbanding was that the NYPD was better equipped and had more manpower to handle enforcement of humane laws and to respond to calls for animal abuse/cruelty. Response to the disbanding has been mixed, with some saying the NYPD can do a better job, while others say the NYPD has other, higher-priority situations to handle and the response to animal abuse and cruelty will be slow.

== Power and authority ==
- ASPCA Law Enforcement officers are New York State peace officers under NYS Criminal Procedure Law 2.10 and may make arrests, use physical and deadly force, make car stops, issue summonses, and may carry a firearm, baton, pepper spray, and handcuffs.
- ASPCA Law Enforcement officers may seize any stray or abandoned animal on public streets in accordance with N.Y. Agriculture & Market laws Section 373 subsection 1.
- ASPCA Law Enforcement officers may lawfully seize any animal on private property that has been kept for more than 12 hours in an unhealthy, dangerous or unsanitary condition in accordance with NY Agriculture and Markets Law Section 373 subsection 2 provided a complaint has been filed.
- ASPCA Law Enforcement officers with a court order may make regular visits to any residence or establishment where an animal is being kept to check to see if the animal is receiving necessary food, water and care according to N.Y. Agriculture & Market law Section 373 subsection 7.
- NYS Agriculture and Markets Law Section 371 permits an ASPCA Law Enforcement officer to "interfere to prevent the perpetration of any act of cruelty upon any animal" in the presence of the ASPCA officer.

== Crime scene investigation ==
In 2007, the ASPCA created an animal cruelty crime scene investigation unit. The CSI unit uses a Ford E-450 vehicle equipped with a surgery area for injured animals, evidence processing, documentation, and storage equipment. The van is staffed with a forensic veterinarian to help document evidence to aid in the prosecution of perpetrators. Although the vehicle is used primarily in New York City, it can be deployed to any area of the United States at the request of a law enforcement agency. The Crime Scene Investigation unit was not affected by the disbandment of the Law Enforcement Division and remains active.

== Law enforcement training ==
ASPCA Humane Law Enforcement officers received peace officer training in addition to investigator training and firearms training. In 1999, ASPCA Humane Law Enforcement recruits began attending a specialized investigator training course through the New York City Police academy.

== Equipment ==
ASPCA Humane Law Enforcement officers were equipped with either a Glock 19 9mm or a Smith & Wesson 5906 9mm handgun, pepper spray, ASP baton, and handcuffs.

Their squad cars were primarily Ford Crown Victoria Police Interceptors, in addition to vans, and SUVs.

They carried poles and cages for seizures and catches.

== Rank structure and title ==
There were five titles (referred to as ranks) in the ASPCA Humane Law Enforcement Division:

- Assistant Director of Law Enforcement
- Executive Officer
- Supervisory Special Investigator
- Special Investigator
- Special Agent

== Fallen officers ==
One former ASPCA Humane Law Enforcement officer is known to have died in the line of duty. The death occurred after the disbandment of the agency and was due to a duty related illness rather than a direct result of carrying out the duties of the position.

Officer	Date of death	Details
Diane DiGiacomo	Friday, November 20, 2015	9/11 related illness

== See also ==
- American Society for the Prevention of Cruelty to Animals
- Law enforcement in New York City
- List of law enforcement agencies in New York
- List of Long Island law enforcement agencies
- New York City Police Department
- Animal Precinct - Animal Planet's documentary reality television series that follows the agents, including agent Tina Salaks, of the ASPCA's Humane Law Enforcement Division in their investigations of animal cruelty
