= Animal Precinct =

- A black-and-white version of the title logo.
- Genre: Reality; Documentary; Crime; Mystery
- Created by: Paul Berriff
- Directed by: Paul Berriff; Rebbecca Colins; Jamie Matson; Ben Rowland
- Narrated by: Michael Madsen (2001–05) Holt McCallany (2005–08)
- Composers: Ernie Wood; Robin Forrest
- Country of origin: United States
- Original language: English
- No. of seasons: 7
- No. of episodes: 115

Production
- Executive producers: Andrea Cornes; Alexandra J. Bennett; Sarah Tobin
- Producers: Jason Benjamin; Kevin Hefner; Vanessa Frances; Sian Jones; Richard Bonser; Paul Fitzgerald (II)
- Production location: New York City
- Cinematography: Paul Berriff; Bala Bailey; Richard Graveling; Jamie Matson; Ben Rowland; Jason Shepherd
- Camera setup: Multiple
- Running time: 45 minutes
- Production company: Anglia Television

Original release
- Network: Animal Planet
- Release: June 26, 2001 – February 4, 2008

Related
- Animal Cops; Miami Animal Police

Animal Precinct is an American documentary reality television series created by Paul Berriff that originally aired from June 26, 2001, to February 4, 2008, on Animal Planet. Set in New York City, the series follows the animal cruelty agents of the ASPCA Humane Law Enforcement Division as they work as advocates for the five million pets and other animals in New York City, sometimes removing them from dangerous situations and pursuing arrests of those who have been accused of being cruel to animals.

The show was filmed locally by crews from Anglia Television, edited in the UK and shown on Discovery Channel networks worldwide.

== Format ==
When the series debuted in 2001, episodes were 30 minutes in length. This was later extended to a full hour, and remained there for all subsequent seasons. The pilot episode was quite different from subsequent episodes, as it focused primarily on Special Investigator Annemarie Lucas and included her discussing various parts of her job, such as how she felt about carrying a gun.

=== Seasons ===
Season	# Episodes	Premiered	Ended
1	16	June 26, 2001	January 7, 2002
2	17	December 23, 2002	February 10, 2003
3	15	August 4, 2003	April 12, 2004
4	10	September 20, 2004	December 16, 2005
5	17	April 15, 2006	September 29, 2006
6	16	April 16, 2007	November 2, 2007
7	9	January 14, 2008	February 4, 2008

=== Specials ===
==== "Animal Precinct at Ground Zero" ====
On October 12, 2001, Animal Planet aired a one-hour special focused on the work to rescue the many animals that were affected by the fall of the World Trade Center towers on September 11.

== Cast ==
The ASPCA Humane Law Enforcement (HLE) officers can be classified as Special Agents or Special Investigators. Many HLE officers are identified by name on-camera; however, some are not, instead spoken of only by initial (most notably "Special Agent M" and "Special Agent Q") with their faces blurred when on-camera as a way to protect their identities so that they can do undercover work for the ASPCA.

During the first three seasons, the HLE team had ten investigators. At the start of the fourth season, the team had been expanded to fifteen investigators. In season six, the team expanded again, and as of May 2008, the HLE has twenty investigators, including a female undercover agent ("Special Agent L").

In 2007, Special Investigator Annemarie Lucas was promoted to Supervisory Special Investigator. As a result of the extra duties associated with her promotion, she does fewer street work cases, but still occasionally participates in investigations when other agents need her assistance.

- Kristi Adams
- John De La Torre
- Diane DiGiacomo (died in the line of duty, see below)
- Adam Gankiewicz
- Bob Clark
- Mike Geller
- Paul Lai
- Annemarie Lucas
- Mark MacDonald
- Joe Pentangelo
- Richard Raheb
- Peter Rivas
- Paul Romano
- Henry Ruiz (formerly "Special Agent H" when he was undercover)
- Richard Ryan
- Tina Salaks
- Joann Sandano
- Timothy Stack
- Michelle Norman (currently running a blog AnimalsEvent.com)
- Michael Tietje (retired in 2006)

=== Special Agent H ===
Special Agent Henry Ruiz was known as "Special Agent H" during the show's early seasons but revealed his true identity in the episode aired on July 18, 2005, after he ceased performing undercover work. Ruiz's "unmasking" was the subject of a series of special episodes of Animal Precinct, in which footage of Ruiz's past rescues was shown for the first time without the facial blurring, as well as footage from his last major undercover operation for the ASPCA (reconnaissance and surveillance of an area holding roosters bred for cock fighting) with Ruiz demonstrating and explaining his undercover techniques on-camera. However, completed episodes filmed while Ruiz was still "Special Agent H" still have his face blurred whenever he appears on-screen.

=== Diane DiGiacomo ===
In 2014, Special Investigator Diane DiGiacomo was diagnosed with cancer that was directly attributed to her exposure to toxins while working as a part of animal search and rescue operations after the September 11 attacks that were depicted in the Animal Precinct at Ground Zero special. DiGiacomo died on November 20, 2015, as a result of that cancer. Although DiGiacomo's death occurred over 14 years after the attack and almost 2 years after the January 2014 dissolution of the Humane Law Enforcement Division, the Officer Down Memorial Page considers her death to be in the line of duty. This makes DiGiacomo the only known line of duty death in the history of the ASPCA Humane Law Enforcement Division.

== Equipment ==
The agents of the ASPCA Humane Law Enforcement have full police powers. Their police powers stem from a law that was written in 1866 by ASPCA founder Henry Bergh. They are certified New York State peace officers and have statewide jurisdiction, though they only work in the confines of New York City's 5 boroughs (Manhattan, Queens, Bronx, Brooklyn, and Staten Island).

The agents of the ASPCA Humane Law Enforcement have the same equipment NYPD police officers do, plus some items that are specialized for animal-related work. The agents are issued either a Glock 19 9mm or a Smith & Wesson 5906 9mm handgun, pepper spray, ASP baton, and handcuffs. Their squad cars are Ford Crown Victoria Police Interceptors, vans, and SUVs. They carry poles and cages for animal catches and seizures.

== Reception ==
The success of Animal Precinct led Animal Planet to create an "umbrella rotation" of similar shows known collectively as "Animal Planet Heroes". Though the shows have similar formats, each has its own unique elements due to the differences in the ways the individual cities deal with animal care and cruelty cases. There have currently been eight similar shows based on the Animal Precinct concept:

- Animal Cops: Detroit (Detroit, Michigan)
- Animal Cops: Houston (Houston, Texas)
- Miami Animal Police (Miami-Dade, Florida)
- Animal Cops: San Francisco (San Francisco, California)
- Animal Cops: Phoenix (formally "Animal Planet Heroes: Phoenix") (Phoenix, Arizona)
- Animal Cops: South Africa (Cape of Good Hope, South Africa)
- Animal Cops: Philadelphia (Philadelphia, Pennsylvania)
- Animal Cops: Miami (also Miami-Dade, Florida)

In 2002, the series won the Genesis Award for the "Best Reality Programming" category.

== See also ==
- ASPCA
- ASPCA Humane Law Enforcement Division
