= Angela Allen (script supervisor) =

British script supervisor (born 1929)

- Born: Angela Jean Allen; 12 February 1929 (age 97); Maida Vale, London, England
- Occupation: Script supervisor
- Years active: 1947–present
- Awards: BAFTA Award, Order of the British Empire

Angela Jean Allen (born 12 February 1929) is a British script supervisor, known for her seven decades of work on nearly one hundred films including The Third Man, The African Queen, and The Misfits. She has worked with many famous actors and film directors, has an MBE for services to film and a BAFTA Michael Balcon Award for Outstanding British Contribution to Cinema.

== Early life and career ==
Angela Jean Allen was born on 12 February, 1929 in Maida Vale, London, England. She attended Paddington & Maida Vale High School in London, England. Her first job was as a junior receptionist at an actors’ agency. After another secretarial job, she worked as a continuity assistant/trainee at Isleworth Studios.

The first film she worked on was Night Beat in 1947, followed by Bonnie Prince Charlie (1948) in Scotland. At age 19 she was “Sewer Queen” for The Third Man (1949) in Vienna where she worked with the assistant director Guy Hamilton and director Carol Reed.

Allen was involved in 15 films with John Huston including Moulin Rouge, Moby Dick, The Man Who Would be King and The Misfits. She also worked several times each with directors Sidney Lumet, John Frankenheimer and Franco Zeffirelli, including on his last film Callas Forever in 2002. Altogether she worked on nearly 100 films.

Early on in her career, without computers, videos, Polaroid cameras or playback machines, Allen had to be on set continually and be very observant. She wrote copious, scrupulously detailed notes on, for example, dialogue changes, camera angles, wardrobe, and props and then typed them up. Her job was to make sure that a film could be edited as smoothly as possible, minimising expensive reshoots, liaising between the director and editor and responding to questions from all departments whether props, costume, make-up, camera or sound. In addition to her continuity assignments and offering suggestions in the cutting room, Allen occasionally doubled for actresses, for example for Ava Gardner in Pandora and The Flying Dutchman (1951), and for Katherine Hepburn in The African Queen.

Allen helped change the title of her job from "continuity girl" to "script supervisor", emphasising that the job was not that of a secretary taking orders. This change of title improved the tax coding of the profession. Allen did much her work at a time when chances for women to direct, produce, edit, and cut were limited. As a continuity supervisor she had sometimes to battle with overconfident or aggressive directors to maintain the continuity of shots. Allen now mentors young continuity supervisors such as Ann Skinner and Annie Penn.

In 2026, Allen attended showings of the film ‘Angela Allen: The Woman Who Saw Everything’ directed by David Thompson and took part in Q and A sessions about the film.

== Awards ==
- Honorary Member of the Guild of British Camera Technicians (GBCT).
- MBE (Member of the British Empire) for services to the film industry in the Queen's New Years Honour's List 1996.
- In 2005, BAFTA’s Michael Balcon Award for Outstanding British Contribution to Cinema.
