= Guild of Television Camera Professionals =

Professional Guild

Guild of Television Camera Professionals (GTC)
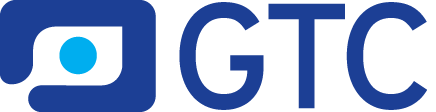
- Founded: 1972; 54 years ago
- Founder: Dick Hibberd
- Type: Professional Guild
- Purpose: to preserve the professional status of all those earning their living through working with television cameras and to establish, uphold and advance standards and expertise within our profession.
- Location: UK
- Members: 1800
- Key people: President - John Henshall; Chair - Graham Maunder; Vice Chair - Rob Emmanuel; Secretary - Graham Risdon; Treasurer - Graham Maunder; IAWF rep - Graham Horder; Administrator - Roger Richards
- Website: www.gtc.org.uk
- Formerly called: Guild of Television Cameramen (GTC)

The Guild of Television Camera Professionals (GTC) is a not for profit organisation representing camera people working in all genres with around 1800 members globally with the majority being in the UK. The stated aim of the GTC is "to preserve the professional status of all those earning their living through working with television cameras and to establish, uphold and advance standards and expertise within our profession."

The GTC is one of four camera craft organisations in the UK, the others being the British Society of Cinematographers (BSC), the Guild of British Camera Technicians (GBCT) and the Association of Camera Operators (ACO).

== Purpose ==
The GTC acts as a source of advice and information for its members on all matters pertaining to camerawork. It is not a trade union and avoids any political involvement. The GTC holds an annual awards ceremony with awards for excellence with recipients being drawn from a wide range of programme types including natural history, TV drama, news and current affairs and light entertainment.

The GTC uses its position to educate and inform about matters that affect camera professionals and the general public and will also defend the rights of camera professionals and production staff. In the past it has contributed to writing on the design and specification of equipment.

== History ==
The GTC was formed in 1972 when Dick Hibberd saw a need for an organisation to support the growing numbers of people working behind the camera. A meeting was held at ATV in Birmingham with as many cameramen as he could persuade to attend. From there the GTC was formed. Dick remained a member of the GTC, member 001, eventually being awarded the title of president until his death in 2015.

The title of President was then passed by Council to one of the other founder members, John Henshall in 2015.

=== International Association of Wildlife Filmmakers ===
In January 2016 the IAWF became affiliated to the GTC. The IAWF represents the interests of people working within the specialist field of natural history filmmaking. It has one seat on the GTC council.

=== Name change ===
In 2017 the GTC changed its name from The Guild of Television Cameramen to The Guild of Television Camera Professionals. The name change was to better reflect the more diverse range of roles and backgrounds that the current membership comprised including vision engineers, self shooting directors and educators. It was decided upon after a vote by members firstly on the chosen name and secondly to adopt the name change.

== Membership ==
Membership of the GTC is open to anyone working with cameras from trainees to director of photography and cinematographer and all grades in between. Student membership is available for those still in education.

Unlike other organisations there is no imperative for members to use a post nominal of any sort. Some members do but this is their own decision and neither required nor requested as part of membership.

=== Membership grades ===
Full: For those with more than three years professional experience in any branch of television.

Associate: For those with less than three years professional experience in any branch of television.

Affiliate: For those who are ineligible for any other category of membership but who, in the opinion of the Council, would further or promote the objectives of the GTC.

Student: For those in education

IAWF: For members of the International Association of Wildlife Filmmakers

Retired: For previous GTC members, now retired

Academic: For educational establishments teaching appropriate courses

== Structure ==
The GTC is governed by a constitution that the GTC Council is bound to follow. "Council" as it is colloquially known is the ruling body of the GTC, consists of up to twenty members who are elected on a two yearly cycle using a democratic ballot amongst all eligible members. Some Council members are remunerated for their work as it is either time consuming or revenue generating. If there is a requirement for someone to be in Council but who was not elected by ballot then it is possible for them to be co-opted onto council to undertake the role required. Council can then remove that co-option as they see fit. Council members are required to attend a minimum number of council meetings or there are constitutional grounds for their removal.

Council meet either physically or via a video meeting every six to eight weeks and work to maintain the aims of the GTC and its membership. The officers and other roles within Council are voted for by Council members, usually immediately after the bi-annual election. The current Council (2020-2022) is led by Chair Graham Maunder, Vice Chair Kate Harvest and Secretary is Peter Rance. The next Council will be elected in June 2022.

== Publications ==
The GTC publishes six magazines every year, Zerb and GTC In Focus.

=== Zerb ===
Zerb is the title of the half yearly magazine published by the GTC, in print and electronically, and available to members and non members (via a subscription). It is currently edited by a team with Bill Shepherd as Commissioning Editor and Sarah Adams as Production Editor. Topics cover every aspect of camera work and celebrate the diverse nature of the work of the GTC membership and are generally written by working camera people. It is regarded by members and the industry as being a high quality, informative publication.

The name "Zerb" was chosen in 1973 and apparently "The hazy origins of its eccentric name may be hidden in the mists of time".

Zerb is kept in the main catalogue of the British Library.

=== GTC In Focus ===
GTC In Focus is a published four times a year on the same terms as Zerb, with the content being more news based. GTC In Focus is currently edited by Roger Richards and contains reports on GTC Workshops and events, features on recent productions, reviews of equipment and contributions from specialists in insurance, accountancy and mental health.

=== Zerb Mental Health Supplement ===
In 2018 the GTC produced a special publication, the Zerb Mental Health Supplement to promote mental health awareness and wellbeing among freelancers. The second edition was published in 2020 with a third edition planned for 2024.

== Training and education ==
=== Workshops ===
While the GTC do not undertake formal training they do provide workshops for members and non members covering areas such as emerging technologies in camerawork, lighting and first aid. They have also held GTC Round Table events, featuring input from industry professionals from all areas.

=== GTC Academy ===
As part of the GTC's educational remit they hold regular "Academy" days at universities across the UK. These serve to not only broaden the understanding of what the GTC does but also to enable attendees to listen and talk to established camera professionals.

== GTC Awards ==
The GTC Awards were held annually and comprised the Awards for Excellence (in camera work) and a range of other awards that promoted achievement relating to the art and craft of camerawork, including the GTC Dick Hibberd Award (formerly the TiCA or Television Cameraman's Award) and GTC Seal of Approval awarded for equipment that has made an outstanding contribution to the art and craft of the television camera professional.

Nominations were made by members and encompassed work first transmitted, distributed or published online in the preceding twelve months.

Award winners did not have to be members or based in the UK. Among many winners was British documentary filmmaker and photographer Paul Berriff.

In 2023 it was decided that the Awards for Excellence would be paused for the foreseeable future. The Seal of Approval was renamed the GTC Innovation Award and two new categories of GTC President's Award and GTC Chair's Award would be presented alongside the GTC Dick Hibberd Award.
