= Tina Salaks =

- Born: Milwaukee, Wisconsin
- Education: Bachelor's (Theater)
- Alma mater: University of Wisconsin–Milwaukee
- Known for: Humane agent ASPCA, actor on Animal Planet's "Animal Precinct" series
- Notable work: Paw & Order: Dramatic Investigations by An Animal Cop on the Beat
- Movement: Animal protection
- Website: Facebook page

Tina Salaks, a resident of New York City, is a former special agent with the American Society for the Prevention of Cruelty to Animals (ASPCA) Humane Law Enforcement Division appearing in the "Animal Precinct" series on Animal Planet.

== Biography ==
After graduating from Milwaukee Lutheran High School, Salaks attended the University of Wisconsin–Milwaukee, where she majored in theater.

She is the author of Paw & Order: Dramatic Investigations of an Animal Cop on the Beat, released by BowTie Press in 2008.

Prior to joining the ASPCA in 1999, then-Agent Salaks was a mounted officer with the New York City Parks Department.

Salaks works with Green Chimneys, an animal rescue and child welfare organization in upstate New York, which adopted several of the rescued animals featured in her book, including Franklin, the runaway lamb. A portion of each sale is donated to American Humane Association, a national animal and child welfare organization.

In June 2008, she appeared on Animal Planet in a "Cats in Trouble" segment.

On the 10th anniversary of the September 11 attacks, Salaks was interviewed by the Boston Globe for a story about Manhattan residents as they paused to remember that day.

== Bibliography ==
- Salaks, Tina (2008). Paw & Order: Dramatic Investigations by An Animal Cop on the Beat. USA: BowTie Press. ISBN 978-1-933958-21-7.
