= British Film Editors =

- Founded: 1966; 60 years ago
- Type: Professional Honorary Society
- Location: UK
- Chairs: Dicky Everton BFE & Stefania Marangoni BFE
- Website: www.britishfilmeditors.co.uk
- Formerly called: Guild of British Film and Television Editors (GBFTE), Guild of British Film Editors (GBFE)

British Film Editors (BFE) is a not-for profit honorary society of professional British Film and Television Editors.

BFE was formed by some 40 British film editors in 1966. Originally named the Guild of British Film Editors (GBFE), as more television programmes – particularly dramas and drama series – were pre-recorded rather than broadcast live its membership very soon included editors working in television as well. In 2005, when the advance of digital recording and editing meant that very few editors were actually working with film at all, the name was changed to the Guild of British Film and Television Editors. At the same time the motto “Crafting the Moving Image” was added to the logo to reflect these changes. In 2020, the name was changed to British Film Editors to underline that the rapid differentiation in screen culture - from mediums to platforms - is nevertheless rooted in 'motion image'.

The honorary society has always had two main aims: to raise the profile of the craft of editing and to maintain the technical and creative skills of editors working in film and television.

As a member of the Cine Guilds of Great Britain, the honorary society does not act as a trade union.

== Craft of motion picture editing ==
Professionals in the industry have long recognised the importance of editing to finished films and television programmes, with awards from the US Academy of Motion Picture Arts and Sciences (Oscars), the British Academy of Film and Television Arts (BAFTAs) and many film festivals. In 2009 BFE (then GBFTE) joined with the Editors’ Guilds of Austria, Germany, Poland and Switzerland to successfully petition the European Film Academy for an award for Editing from that organisation. The first EFA Editing Award was presented at the Awards Ceremony in Tallinn, Estonia, on 4 December 2010.

The creative importance of Editors to the finished production is also being recognised by some countries, such as Germany and Finland, by including them alongside Directors, Writers, Composers, Cinematographers and Production Designers as “rightsholders” who are entitled to receive payments when the productions are broadcast in those countries.

In 2011 BFE (then GBFTE) joined with the BSC (British Society of Cinematographers), GBCT (Guild of British Camera Technicians) and BECTU (the UK Industry Technicians trades union) to form a Collecting Society - Screen Craft Rights - to receive these payments from Germany and other countries and distribute them to UK Cinematographers, Designers and Editors.

== History ==
Among the forty or so Founding Members of the honorary society were Anne V. Coates who was awarded a BAFTA Fellowship in 2007 and Terry Rawlings who received the American Cinema Editors Career Achievement Award in 2006. Other founding members were Ernest Walter, Freddie Wilson, Jack Harris, Bernard Gribble, Geoff Foot, Ralph Sheldon, Bill Lewthwaite, Jim Clark and Teddy Darvas, editor of the classic British movie The Railway Children. Many of these served as Governors of the Guild during their careers. Some of the founder members were also directors, such as Roy Baker and John Glen, who moved from Editing to Directing in 1968 and David Lean became an Honorary Member in 1968.
