= Lessons of Darkness =

- "Has life without fire become unbearable for them?"
- Directed by: Werner Herzog
- Written by: Werner Herzog
- Produced by: Paul Berriff; Werner Herzog; Lucki Stipetić
- Narrated by: Werner Herzog
- Cinematography: Simon Werry; Paul Berriff; Rainer Klausmann
- Edited by: Rainer Standke
- Production companies: Canal+ Première; Werner Herzog Filmproduktion
- Distributed by: Werner Herzog Filmproduktion
- Release date: 1992
- Running time: 54 minutes
- Countries: Germany; France; United Kingdom
- Languages: German; English; Arabic

Lessons of Darkness (German: Lektionen in Finsternis) is a 1992 documentary film directed by Werner Herzog. The film is an exploration of the ravaged oil fields of post-Gulf War Kuwait, portrayed in a manner that accentuates the catastrophic and surreal nature of the landscape. An effective companion to Herzog's earlier film Fata Morgana, the film again perceives the desert as a landscape with its voice.

A co-production with Paul Berriff, the film was financed by the television studios Canal+ and Première.

== Synopsis ==
The film is a meditation on catastrophe, contextualized through the literary modes of religion and science fiction. It begins with a quotation, attributed to Blaise Pascal: "The collapse of the stellar universe will occur – like creation – in grandiose splendor." This attribution is apocryphal, as the text was written by Herzog for the film and chosen, like the music, to give the film a certain mood. The prologue of the quotation is followed by thirteen sections, denoted by numbered title cards: "A Capital City", "The War", "After the Battle", "Finds from Torture Chambers", "Satan's National Park", "Childhood", "And a Smoke Arose like a Smoke from a Furnace", "A Pilgrimage", "A Dinosaur's Feast", "Protuberances", "The Drying Up of the Source", "Life Without the Fire" and "I am so tired of sighing; Lord, let it be night".

Mostly devoid of commentary, the imagery concentrates on the aftermath of the first Gulf War – specifically on the Kuwaiti oil fires, although no relevant political or geographical information is mentioned. Herzog intended to alienate the audience from images to which they had become inured from saturated news coverage. In his words, Herzog wanted to "penetrate deeper than CNN ever could". Herzog uses a telephoto lens, truck-mounted shots as in Fata Morgana, static shots of the workers near the oil fires, and many helicopter shots of the bleak landscape. By avoiding establishing shots, Herzog heightens the apocalyptic effect of depicting the devastated landscape. Herzog remarked that "the film has not a single frame that can be recognised as our planet, and yet we know it must have been shot here".

Herzog's sparse commentary interprets the imagery out of its documentary context, and into a fiction: the opening narration begins "A planet in our solar system/wide mountain ranges, clouds, the land shrouded in mist". The narrative stance is detached, bemused; Herzog makes no effort to explain the actual causes of the catastrophic scenes, but interprets them in epic terms with vaunting rhetoric to accompany the Wagnerian score. The workers are described as "creatures" whose behaviour is motivated by madness and a desire to perpetuate the damage that they are witnessing. A climactic scene involves the workers re-igniting the flow of oil, shortly after succeeding in stopping the fires. The narration asks, "Has life without fire become unbearable for them?"

== Reception ==
Lessons of Darkness won "Grand Prix" at the Melbourne International Film Festival. At the close of its screening at the Berlin Film Festival, the audience reacted furiously to the film, rising to castigate Herzog with accusations that he had aestheticised the horror of the war. The director waved his hands fiercely and protested "You're all wrong! You're all wrong!", and later maintained Hieronymous Bosch and Goya had done likewise in their art.

The Los Angeles Times' end of year review for 1992 recognized the film as "the year's most memorable documentary", describing it as "Herzog's apocalyptic, ultimately ironic view of the Gulf War". Critic Janet Maslin remarked that the director "uses his gift for eloquent abstraction to create sobering, obscenely beautiful images of a natural world that has run amok"; her colleague J. Hoberman called it "the culmination of Mr. Herzog's romantic doomsday worldview". Academic Rachel June Torbett hailed Lessons of Darkness as both "extraordinarily beautiful" and "deeply ambiguous", interpreting the decontextualization of the geopolitical background as an avoidance which meant that the intent of the work lacked clarity.

The technique of re-contextualizing documentary footage was also used in Herzog's later film The Wild Blue Yonder.

== Soundtrack ==
The sources of music used in the film were classical, and predominantly theatrical:

Scene	Music	Composer
(Prelude)	Das Rheingold (Overture)	Richard Wagner
A Capital City The War	Peer Gynt Suite No. 1, Op. 46 (Death of Aase)	Edvard Grieg
After the Battle	Parsifal (Overture)	Richard Wagner
Finds from Torture Chambers	Sonata for Two Violins, op. 56 (Andante cantabile)	Sergei Prokofiev
Satan's National Park	Stabat Mater (starts from vocal entrance)	Arvo Pärt
And a Smoke Arose like a Smoke from a Furnace	Siegfried's death and Funeral march (Götterdämmerung)	Richard Wagner
A Dinosaur's Feast	Messa da Requiem – Recordare	Giuseppe Verdi
The Drying Up of the Source	Notturno op. 148	Franz Schubert
Life Without the Fire I am so tired of sighing; Lord, let it be night	Symphony No. 2, (Urlicht)	Gustav Mahler

== Bibliography ==
- Herzog, Werner (2002). Paul Cronin (ed.). Herzog on Herzog. Faber and Faber. ISBN 0571207081. OCLC 50581849.
