= Paul Berriff =

British filmmaker and photojournalist

Paul Berriff OBE
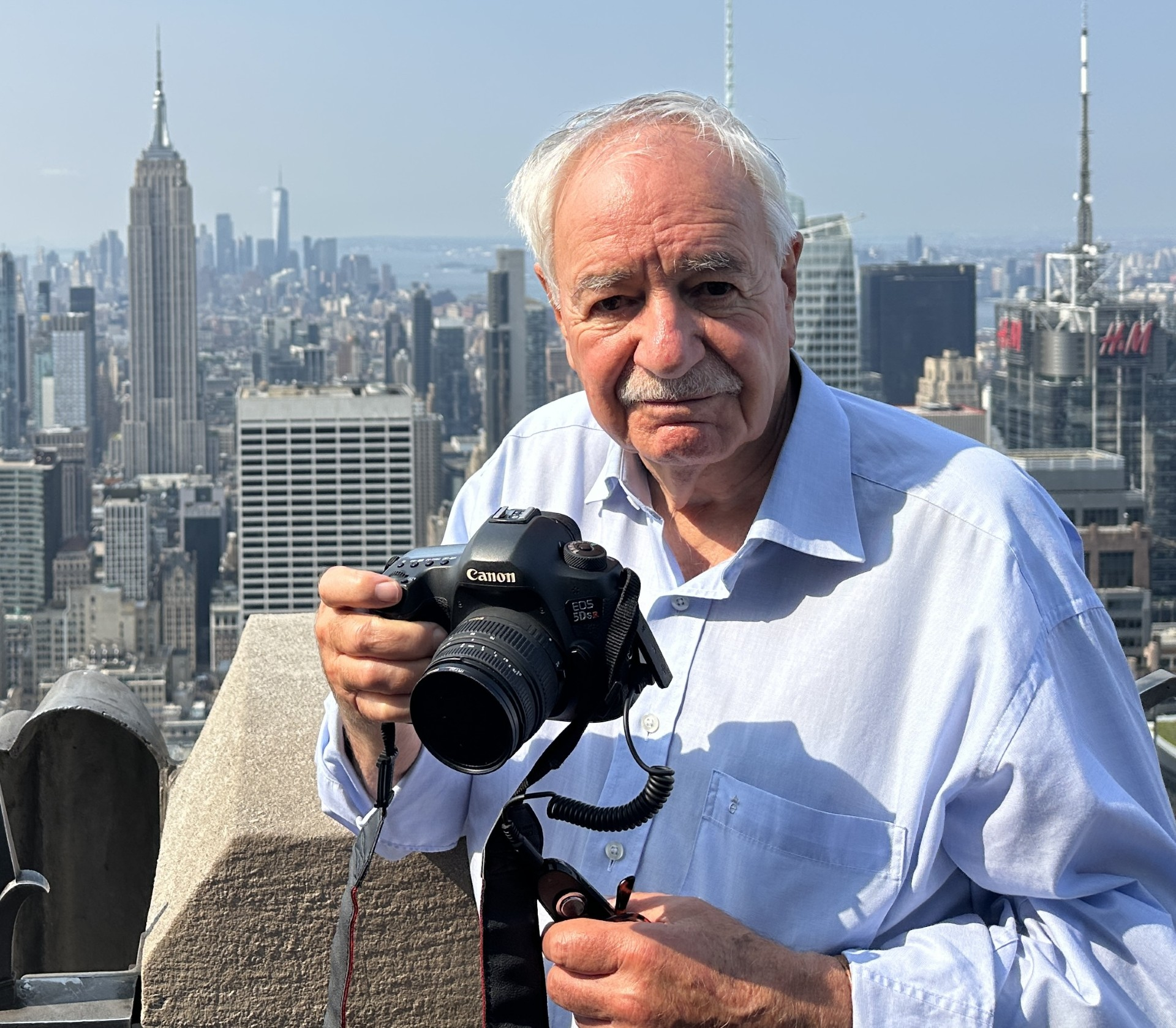
- Berriff in 2026
- Born: July 7, 1946 (age 80); Yorkshire, England
- Occupations: Documentarian, fine art photographer, cinematographer, producer
- Years active: 1960s–present
- Organization: Paul Berriff Productions
- Known for: War and rescue documentaries, 9/11 footage
- Notable work: Rescue; Fire in the Night; Animal Precinct; Lessons of Darkness
- Spouse: Hilary Berriff
- Children: 2
- Awards: 2 BAFTAs; Guild of Television Cameramen
- Website: www.paulberriffproductions.co.uk

Paul Berriff (born July 7, 1946) is a British documentary filmmaker, photographer, cinematographer, photojournalist and author. Over a career spanning seven decades, he has directed and produced more than 180 prime-time network documentaries, receiving multiple international awards including two Scottish BAFTA Awards. He gained recognition for collaborating with filmmaker Werner Herzog, serving as cinematographer and producer for Herzog's award winning feature documentary Lessons of Darkness, as well as for his coverage of major world events and disasters.

Berriff is also known for surviving multiple near-death experiences while filming, most notably during the September 11 terrorist attacks in New York City where he was caught in the collapse of the Twin Towers at the World Trade Center, while documenting the emergency response.

He began his career photographing rock stars such as The Beatles, The Rolling Stones and Jimi Hendrix, before transitioning into filmmaking and television. Associated with early observational "fly-on-the-wall" documentary filmmaking, various publications have referred to Berriff by the nickname "The Indiana Jones of television" due to his adventurous filmmaking career, extensive rescue work and survival of numerous disasters. Berriff has been heavily involved in search and rescue operations throughout his career. In 1989, he set up Humber Rescue, it remains one of Britain's busiest lifeboat rescue stations, of which he is a former commander.

In 2016, he was appointed an Officer of the Order of the British Empire (OBE) in Queen Elizabeth II's 2016 Birthday Honours list for his services to maritime search and rescue, and in 2017 he received the Guild of Television Camera Professionals' highest award for outstanding contribution to cinematography.

== Early life ==
He grew up in Headingley, Leeds, Yorkshire. His father was a press photographer on The Yorkshire Post. Berriff would later go on to start his career at the region's evening newspaper, the Yorkshire Evening Post.

As a child Berriff had been impacted by the sight of Whitby lifeboat crews returning from a dramatic sea rescue of a crashed military plane in Saltwick Bay. He watched the wreckage get brought into shore and the event would later inspire him to found the search and rescue charity Humber Rescue.

Berriff began photography at the age of 12.

== Career ==
=== Early career ===
He began his career at the age of 16 as an editorial assistant on the Yorkshire Evening Post, a newspaper based in Leeds. Paul eventually used his contacts to gain backstage access at local theatres and went on to photograph numerous rock acts on the verge of global stardom. Amongst the many emerging groups of the era that he photographed included, The Beatles, The Rolling Stones, Pink Floyd, Jimi Hendrix, The Hollies, The Searchers and singers such as Roy Orbison, Marianne Faithful, Sandie Shaw, Gerry Marsden and Adam Faith.

Berriff had good contacts with theatre managers who gave him free backstage access when the up and coming music acts appeared. The Beatles captured highly relaxed and candid off-duty moments, including the famous "Beatles Playing at Trains" photo backstage in Manchester, and the band eating sandwiches on a break in Hull. On 22 November 1963, Berriff photographed John Lennon and Paul McCartney performing at the ABC Theatre in Huddersfield. This occurred the exact day "I Want to Hold Your Hand" was released, capturing the first time they ever performed the track live.

Several months after his work photographing music acts Berriff became an official press photographer on the paper and his "training" negatives were put away in a box in his attic. They were stored there for nearly 50 years until Berriff decided to return to stills photographer and rediscovered the boxes of photographs he had taken of various music acts. Subsequently Berriff's work, particular on The Beatles, capturing intimate photographs of their first UK tour have since been exhibited globally including galleries in San Francisco, New York, London, Prague and Dubai.

Numerous of his works are regarded as highly sought-after collectors' items, and his exclusive Beatles collection has been purchased by some of the world's leading pop musicians and private collectors as well as a top museum in the USA. Gerry Goldman, the former CEO of The Beatles Story museum in Liverpool later described Berriff’s photographs of the band as "the best I've ever seen of the group during the early part of their career"

He went on to work as a news cameraman at the BBC, becoming the youngest ever cameraman to work for the BBC at the time at the age of 21. He then moved to the BBC Current Affairs Unit where he filmed front-line documentaries for BBC One. He and his three-man crew were the documentary news team for the prestigious BBC Nationwide programme covering major stories throughout the British Isles. After his departure from the BBC Berrif set up his own, BAFTA Award winning independent production company.

Early in his career Berriff spent 12 months alongside King Charles III filming his exploits as a helicopter pilot, he then went on to film a portrait of Sir Francis Chichester, the first person to sail solo around the world. Berriff filmed the first ever kayak and raft expedition down the Colorado River which earned him several awards. Berriff has also filmed three of Sir Ranulph Fiennes expeditions into the wild parts of Canada and North America.

Early on his career Berriff worked on the set of the 1973 James Bond film Live and Let Die as a behind-the-scenes documentary photographer, capturing rare images of the films' stars Roger Moore and Jane Seymour.

=== September 11 attacks ===
Berriff is the only known British citizen to survive the collapse of both Twin Towers at the base of the World Trade Center. On the morning of the attacks, Paul was working on the American series Animal Precinct, at the ASPCA (American Society for the Prevention of Cruelty to Animals) office when he and his sound recordist and assistant producer first heard of Flight 11 hitting the North Tower. Upon their arrival at the site, Berriff spent around 20 minutes filming the FDNY’s Deputy Chief Fire Commissioner at the base of the World Trade Center, until the South Tower suddenly collapsed. Berriff captured the entire event on camera.

He was knocked to the ground and lay unconscious for 30 minutes, during this time the North Tower also collapsed near Berriff. Once he regained consciousness, he crawled out of the debris to the aftermath of Ground Zero. Disorientated and partially blinded from the dust, Berriff navigated towards safety and found his damaged camera on the street. He subsequently reunited with his colleagues, who were rescued by officers. Berriff was taken to hospital and treated for head injuries. Miraculously, he found his smashed video camera on the street and his tape showing the iconic sequences of the South Tower collapsing had survived.

Berriff captured one of the closest angles of the South Tower's collapse and his footage would later be played on news broadcasts and documentaries throughout the world including the ITV documentary ‘9/11: The Firefighters’ story’, produced a year after the attack and National Geographic's 9/11: One Day in America in 2021.

=== Maritime rescue efforts ===
Beyond media production, Berriff was the founder of the independent search and rescue lifeboat charity Humber Rescue established in 1989 and helped execute over 850 sea rescues, earning his OBE for public service. He managed operations from his home for five years until a dedicated boathouse station was officially opened at Hessle Foreshore in 1995. Humber Rescue averages around 110 callouts annually, providing critical assistance to not only vessels in distress but also more complex rescues such as downed Royal Air Force pilots. The organisation remains one of the busiest rescue operations in the UK.

While filming the TV series Rescue, Berriff was involved in saving a young man off the coast of Scotland, and was subsequently awarded the Queens Commendation for Bravery, the Royal Humane Society Silver Medal for Bravery, and the Silk Cut Awards – Individual Rescue Award.

=== Later career ===
"“Lessons of Darkness is as much a film by Paul Berriff as it is mine. It was a very fortunate collaboration. There was a danger of two cooks preparing one meal, but in this case Paul was a man of such calibre that our collaboration worked very well. Berriff has made a lot of very physically daring films. A courageous man, very physical in his methods of seeing and creating images. He has a real curiosity.”

— Werner Herzog, filmmaker

Aside from the 9/11 attacks, Berriff has been involved in several near-fatal incidents across his career including; an escape from a sudden volcanic eruption while filming in Nicaragua, leaping from a sinking vessel during a fierce North Sea storm. He also walked away from a major RAF helicopter crash during an assignment in the Cairngorms in the north of Scotland.

He was notably on scene at the Piper Alpha oil platform disaster on 6 July 1988, which remains the deadliest offshore oil catastrophe in history, resulting in 167 fatalities. Berriff described the event as "apocalyptic" and stated "I've experienced all sorts of tragedies – I'm a survivor of 9/11, I know what it's like not only to witness trauma but to be a casualty myself. But there's nothing, nothing like Piper Alpha". Berriff's 2013 film Fire in the Night was based on the event.

Berriff's most known work includes; the critically acclaimed series The Nick (1993) on Channel 4 which chronicled and tracked the front lines at Gipton Police Station, documenting juvenile crime and policing in Leeds. He also received acclaim for the series Lifeboat (1984) which followed the raw, unscripted daily lives and emergency calls of coastal lifeboat crews and busy inner-city fire stations.

Paul was also the first TV director to be given unparalleled access by NASA to film a year in the life of a shuttle crew for his Channel Four and PBS observational series Astronauts (1997). Berriff often acted as his own cinematographer on his documentaries.

Berriff initially developed the series Animal Precinct and Animal Squad, reality formatted programs which tracked RSPCA inspectors on duty in New York City and Leeds. Due to its massive success, Animal Planet expanded his format into the Animal Cops franchise, building spin-offs in cities like Houston, Detroit, and Phoenix.

In 1992, he worked with filmmaker Werner Herzog on his Gulf War documentary Lessons of Darkness, serving as cinematographer and co-producer of the film, which received numerous awards including a prize at the Melbourne International Film Festival.

After 15 years of producing prime time documentaries for network television, Berriff was invited to become a director and cinematographer with Granada's prestigious documentary unit in Manchester. After several successful year he joined the factual programme unit at United Productions. He has directed and produced critically acclaimed factual content for broadcasters including the ITV, Channel 4, Channel Five, HBO, PBS, Sky and Discovery.

He's earned prizes at various film festivals including the New York Film Festival, the Chicago International Film Festival, the Paris Film Festival and the Raindance Film Festival winning awards in cinematography and best documentary films.

In 1995 Berriff received a BAFTA TV Award nomination for Best Factual Photography/Cinematography for The Nick (1993). He was later awarded a BAFTA Scotland for his ITV network documentary series Rescue, which followed the life-saving work of a Royal Air Force rescue helicopter crew.

In 2009 Paul teamed up with writer Stephen McGinty and formed Berriff McGinty Films. Berriff received his second BAFTA win with the duos' first production ‘Fire in the Night’ which won Best Documentary Feature at the Scottish BAFTA Awards in November 2013 followed by Best Documentary at the Royal Television Society Awards 2014. The feature film marked the 25th anniversary of the Piper Alpha oil rig disaster, an event Berriff originally covered on-scene during his work on Rescue. In 2013 Paul was DOP and cinematographer on the feature drama film Titus which was nominated for ‘Best Independent Feature Film'. In June 2017 Paul received the top award from the Guild of Television Cameramen for excellence in cinematography.

== Personal life ==
He is a member of several prominent organisations including The Fine Art Trade Guild, The Guild Society of Artists and the National Union of Journalists. Over the span of his career he has trained as a firefighter and is a qualified coastguard.

Berriff reportedly still shoots with film cameras he used during the 1960's and prefers to shoot on monochrome film, but also uses a Canon full frame digital camera for his colour projects. Berriff has said that his camera has been his "passport to adventure."

He later wrote a book titled "9/11 Wrong Place Right Time: Me, My Wife and Muffin Our Cat", about his experience on 9/11.

He lives near Northallerton.
