= Animal Cops =

American television series

Animal Cops is an American reality television franchise that was originally produced in the United States for Animal Planet. Animal Planet has also presented a special edition of Animal Cops with 2009 episodes such as "Back from the Brink" and "Extreme Danger". In addition, scenes from Animal Precinct, a similar show created by Paul Berriff, was produced by Animal Planet, were featured in the Animal Cops special "Cats: Born to Survive" (about various cases involving cats, featuring experts talking about the natural traits that help cats to survive). This is due to Animal Cops being based on the Animal Precinct concept.

== Series ==
The series included the following:

- Animal Cops: Detroit (2002–2008)
- Animal Cops: Houston (2003–2012, 2014–2015)
- Animal Cops: Philadelphia (2009–2010)
- Animal Cops: San Francisco (2005)
- Animal Cops: South Africa (2008)
- Animal Cops: Phoenix (2006–2009), (2016–2018); formerly titled as Animal Planet Heroes: Phoenix
- Animal Cops: Miami (2010–2011)

== See also ==
- List of programs broadcast by Animal Planet
- Animal Precinct (2001–2008)
- Miami Animal Police (2004–2006)
