= Animal Planet (video game) =

- Developer: Discovery Channel Multimedia
- Publisher: Discovery Channel Multimedia
- Platform: Windows
- Release: 1996

Animal Planet, also known as Animal Planet: The Ultimate Wildlife Adventure, is a 1996 video game developed and published by Discovery Channel Multimedia.

== Gameplay ==
In Animal Planet: The Ultimate Wildlife Adventure, the player explores eight major ecosystems, discovering and learning about 1,100 different animals while using tools such as the Bio Web for accessing pre‑screened animal sites, an Animal Tracker for locating specific species, Field Notes for copying text and images, Habitat Pages for ecosystem details, and Animal Pages for in‑depth animal information; the game also includes wallpapers created by young artists, twenty expedition tours unlocked by finding hidden caves in each ecosystem, and a Report Helper that offers ideas and inspiration.

== Reception ==
Reception

Review scores
Publication	Score
Liverpool Echo	5/5
The Sydney Morning Herald	4.5/5

Hartford Courant called Animal Planet excellent for researching a school report or merely satisfying curiosity. Library Journal recommended Animal Planet to public and school libraries.
