= Rescue (British TV series) =

- Genre: Documentary
- Directed by: Paul Berriff
- Country of origin: United Kingdom
- Original language: English
- No. of series: 1
- No. of episodes: 13

Production
- Production company: Paul Berriff Productions in association with Scottish Television

Original release
- Network: ITV
- Release: 7 January – 1 April 1990

Rescue is a 13-part documentary series created, directed and filmed by Paul Berriff. It focused on the air-sea rescue work of "Rescue 137", a Sea King belonging to 202 Sqn, Royal Air Force Search and Rescue Force in and around their base at RAF Lossiemouth, Scotland and the North Sea over a period of a year between 1988 -1989.

The series covered a multitude of incidents ranging from ferrying a sick child to hospital right up to the world's worst offshore disasters, the explosion and ensuing fire on the Piper Alpha oil platform.

Theme and incidental music was by Robert Howes and Rod Argent.

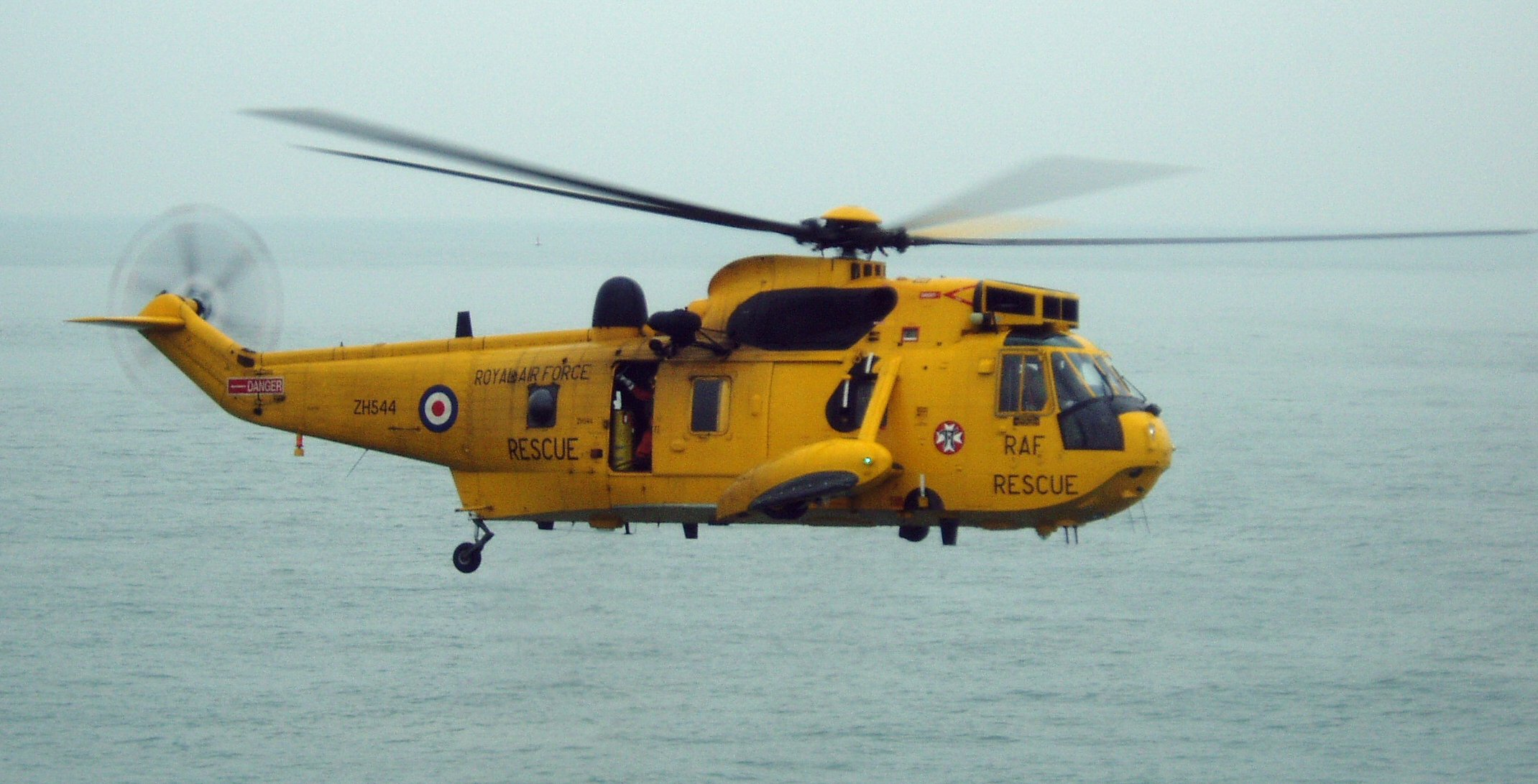
RAF Westland Sea King HAR3A of the type featured in Rescue

== Episode guide ==
Episode 1: Budding Rose (First broadcast 7 January 1990)

The team race to rescue seven crew members from the Peterhead fishing vessel, Budding Rose after it begins taking on water in gale conditions 100 miles east of Aberdeen. The episode is introduced by "Rescue 137" pilot Flight Lieutenant John Prince.

Episode 2: Baby Sam (First broadcast 14 January 1990)

The team are called out to transport a three-month premature baby, Sam Harcus, from Orkney to a hospital in Aberdeen. During the flight, Baby Sam's heart stopped and the helicopter winchman, Bob Pountney, kept the baby alive by providing heart massage during the flight.

Episode 3: White Out (First broadcast 21 January 1990)

The team operate in Scotland during blizzard conditions.

Episode 4: Worse Things Happen at Sea (First broadcast 28 January 1990)

"Rescue 137" scrambles to assist a man who has taken a 20-foot fall on board the Oil Rig support ship Deepwater 2. A later incident involves a call to the fishing vessel Choice which is taking-in water north of Fraserburgh.

Episode 5: Winchman (First broadcast February 4, 1990)

This episode focused on the life of a winchman aboard an RAF Sea King.

Episode 6: Ditching, Ditching, Ditching (First broadcast 11 February 1990)

The team assist in the rescue of persons on board a helicopter that crashed into the North Sea.

Episode 7: Piper Alpha (First broadcast 18 February 1990)

The role that 202 Sqn played in the response to the Piper Alpha tragedy. Throughout the emergency the survivors evacuated by the 202 Sqn teams were lifted via the MSV Tharos.

Episode 8: Chox's Lecture (First broadcast 25 February 1990)

Winchman, Paul "Chox" Barton provides advice for any walkers, climbers and tourists that may not be fully prepared.

Episode 9: Water Falls (First broadcast March 4, 1990)

Water sports which may seem innocuous to some are shown in a different light by the events experienced by the crew of "Rescue 137".

Episode 10: Missing (First broadcast 11 March 1990)

"Rescue 137" is called out to search for a reported missing hill walker, but the rescue is not what it seems. Later the team is called out to rescue men from the burning drilling rig Ocean Odyssey.

Episode 11: Avalanche (First broadcast 18 March 1990)

The mountain rescue team, with Hamish MacInnes, in conjunction with the crew of "Rescue 137", search for people trapped under the snow in the Highlands.

Episode 12: We Never Say Never (First broadcast 25 March 1990)

The team rush against the clock in bad weather to save a 13-year-old girl suffering from meningitis on the Isle of Skye. Due to the falling snow and poor visibility the team are forced to fly via RAF Kinloss at altitudes of 150 feet and lower.

Episode 13: Sting In The Tale (First broadcast 1 April 1990)

The crew set off for a weekend training with the mountain rescue team but an exercise goes drastically wrong.

== Credits ==
The programme was made with the assistance of:

- The Flight Crew of 'D' Flight, No 202 Squadron, RAF Lossiemouth.
- The Ground Crew of 'D' Flight, No 202 Squadron, RAF Lossiemouth.
- The Rescue and Co-ordination Centre, RAF Pitreavie.
- The Mountain rescue teams of:
- RAF Kinloss
- RAF Leuchars
- Lochaber
- Assynt
- Glenmore Lodge
- Cairngorm
- Glencoe
- Kintail
- Skye
- Torridon

And:

- Raigmore Hospital, Inverness
- Aberdeen Royal Infirmary
- Belford Hospital, Fort William
- Broadford Hospital, Isle of Skye
- Scottish Ambulance Service
- Northern Constabulary
- Grampian Police
- Search and Rescue Dog Association
- HM Coastguard
- Grampian Fire Service
- Glenmore Lodge, Aviemore

and those working onshore and offshore in the oil industry.
