= Guild of British Camera Technicians =

Non-profit organisation representing camera technicians

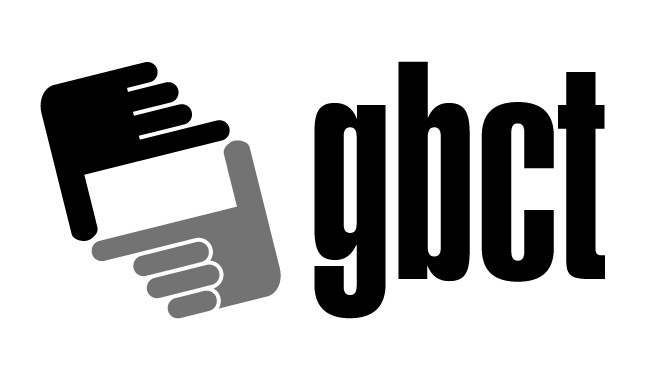
- Founded: 1977; 49 years ago
- Founder: Terry Cole, John Deaton, Mike Fox, Geoff Glover
- Type: Professional Guild
- Purpose: The care and quality of cinematography through progress and innovation
- Headquarters: London, UK
- Location: UK
- Members: 450
- Key people: Chairman - Tim Potter; Guild Admin - TBD
- Website: www.gbct.org

The GBCT is a non-profit organization that serves as a representative body for camera technicians who work in the film and high-end television production industry worldwide. With approximately 450 members, many of whom are also affiliated with other moving image craft organizations such as the British Society of Cinematographers and the Association of Camera Operators, the GBCT operates out of Panavision London offices.

== Affiliations ==
As a member of the Cine Guilds of Great Britain (CGGB), the GBCT does not act as a trade union. The relevant trade union for UK members is the Broadcasting, Entertainment, Communications and Theatre Union (BECTU). Other members of the CGGB include the British Society of Cinematographers (BSC), the society of British Film Editors (BFE) and the British Film Designers Guild (BFDG).

In 2011 the GBCT joined with the BSC, GBFTE and BECTU to form a not for profit collecting society, Screen Craft Rights, to receive copyright payments from sales of film and TV productions to Finland, Germany, Norway and Sweden and distribute them to UK cinematographers, designers and editors.

On 12 May 2020, the GBCT was one of four signatories on a statement related to COVID-19 safer working practices. Other signatories were the BSC, ACO and BECTU Camerabranch.

The GBCT has a long-standing affiliation with the University of Arts London through the UAL Diploma provision.

== Camera craft ==
Professionals in the industry have long recognised the importance of camera craft to finished films and television programmes, with specific awards for cinematography from the Academy of Motion Picture Arts and Sciences the British Academy of Film and Television Arts as well as more craft specific awards such as The Operators Award, organised by the GBCT, the BSC and the Association of Camera Operators as well the Guild of Television Camera Professionals Awards for Excellence in Camerawork.

The GBCT, along with CGGB, made representation to the UK parliaments Select Committee on Culture, Media and Sport in 2007 to ask for assistance in training existing technicians to deliver effective training to new entrants.

== History ==
The Guild, as it is known colloquially among members and the industry, was formed in 1977 by focus pullers Terry Cole and John Deaton and camera operators Mike Fox and Geoff Glover who wanted to create a non-political association with an authoritative presence in the industry. Their intention was to create an organisation that protected the interests and aspirations of a growing freelance workforce while developing new talent and maintaining high standards.

== Trustees ==
The GBCT has eminent trustees drawn from the moving image industry who monitor its constitution. The current trustees are:

Producer: Steve Clark Hall

Producer/Director: Richard Lester

Cinematographer: Phil Méheux

Director: Joe Wright

Former trustees include the late Sue Gibson, founding trustee, the late Sir Sydney Samuelson CBE and the late director Michael Apted

== Membership ==
Members work with and within the camera department, including roles such as grips and script supervisor and specialist technicians for visual effects, aerial and underwater filming. To be accepted for membership they would have to be nominated by four existing members before their nomination is sent to the membership committee. If the committee approve the application then the GBCT Board, made up of the Chairperson and thirteen members of the GBCT, will then scrutinise and discuss the application before deciding whether or not that person can become a member.

Members could be working in a number of grades including (but not exclusive to) clapper loader, focus puller, camera operator, digital imaging technician, and director of photography/cinematographer.

=== Membership grades ===
Full: This category is specifically for current practitioners living in the UK and Eire

Overseas membership: This category is open to British technicians resident outside the UK, or non-British technicians who work regularly in the UK

Associates: Associate members are individuals closely affiliated to the GBCT

Trainees: Membership services and facilities is provided to Guild trainees for the duration of their time as trainees

Retired members: This section is only available to existing Guild Members

Honorary: Honorary Membership is awarded to individuals who have been instrumental in helping to support the Guild in some form or other or by enhancing its standing within the industry. Members in this category include the founders of the GBCT, Remi Adefarasin OBE BSC, Angela Allen (script supervisor) OBE and Chris Menges BSC, ASC.

== Publications ==
The GBCT Crew Directory has been published annually since 1980. It is supplied to members and distributed to production companies and personnel. Between 1980 and 2000, the GBCT published "Eyepiece" on a bi-monthly basis and has a regular feature, written by members, for the BSC publication under the title "GBCT News".

== Training and education ==
One of the most significant areas of work for the GBCT is training and the maintenance of standards. This has included work with the sector skills council ScreenSkills to provide training for military veterans.

=== GBCT Camera Trainee Programme ===
The "GBCT Camera Trainee Programme" is aimed at technicians wanting to work in high-end fiction production. The programme uses existing practitioners' experience and knowledge to provide training and mentorship to trainees who are placed on productions including feature films, TV drama and commercials.

=== GBCT and UAL Diplomas ===
The GBCT and its members have worked with University of the Arts London to design, develop and deliver a series of accredited qualifications for the camera department that blend academic knowledge with vocational skills. The courses include Level 2: Clapper Loading/2nd Assistant Camera; Level 3: Focus Pulling/1st Assistant Camera; Level 2: Grips and Level 3: Key Grips. The courses are financed by ScreenSkills.

=== GBCT and the Mark Milsome Foundation ===
Within the GBCT Camera Trainee Programme is one trainee who has been selected to be the Mark Milsome Trainee. This is a placement assisted by the Mark Milsome Foundation, an organisation set up in honour of camera operator Mark Milsome who lost his life while working on a drama in Ghana in November 2017. Members of the film industry worldwide contributed to the fund that has helped the foundation's work.

== Post nominal ==
While it is not a requirement for members to use the letters 'GBCT' after their name, it is encouraged that they do so in common with organisations such as the BSC, the American Society of Cinematographers and the Directors Guild of America.

== The Guild Kelly Calculator ==
The Guild produced its own version of the Kelly Cine Calculator, originally designed by DoP Skeets Kelly to calculate, amongst other factors, depth of field and hyperfocal distance. Revising it to reflect advances in optics and film stock technology the Guild worked with Kodak Ltd and Dr Stephen Jackson. The revised version was one of the two most commonly used calculators along with the Samcine Calculator.

== Deanne Edwards 1955–2022 ==
Deanne (or Dee) Edwards was the Guild administrator from 2008 until 2022. Dee was recognised at the 2023 BSC Operators Awards with the posthumous presentation of the BSC ARRI John Alcott Award.
