= ASP, Inc. =

American defensive weapons manufacturing company

- Company type: Private
- Industry: Forced Compliance Weapons
- Genre: Law Enforcement Supplies
- Founded: Appleton, Wisconsin, United States (1976)
- Founder: Kevin Parsons
- Headquarters: Appleton, Wisconsin, United States
- Area served: Worldwide
- Key people: Kevin Parsons, founder, Chairman and CEO
- Products: Tactical batons, Handcuffs, OC Products, Lighting, Training
- Services: Police Use of Force Training
- Website: www.asp-usa.com

Armament Systems and Procedures, Inc. (ASP, Inc.) is a US-based manufacturer of compliance weapons and other equipment used by law enforcement and private security companies. It is best known for its ASP telescoping batons.

== History ==
ASP was founded in 1976. Agencies such as the US Secret Service began using ASP batons as an intermediate non-lethal weapon. In 1987, the company launched the ASP training division with the inaugural Tactical Baton Seminar, held in Atlantic City. In 1995, the company entered the pepper spray business with the introduction of the Defender. In 1996, it entered the police flashlight business. In 2004, it began designing and engineering restraints.

== Products ==
=== ASP telescopic baton ===
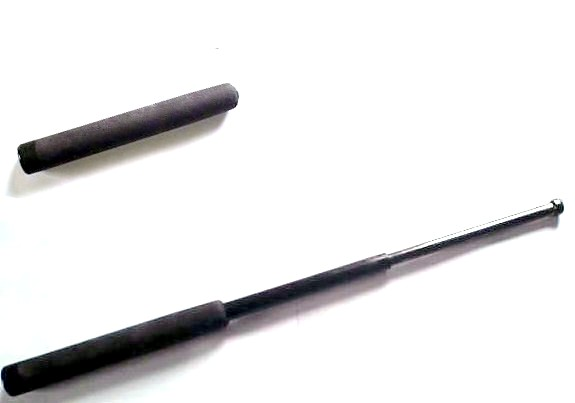
ASP 21-inch (530 mm) tactical baton in expanded and collapsed states.

ASP manufactures telescopic batons. ASP batons have been adopted by law enforcement agencies in the United States, United Kingdom, Canada, New Zealand and Australia, and expandable batons are sometimes referred to as "Asps".

ASP batons are friction-lock in design, and are opened by swinging the handle forcibly through the air. To close this type, the baton's tip is driven into a hard surface to break the friction. The friction-lock Airweight series (P12 and P16), for plainclothed concealment, was released in 2012.

=== Other products ===
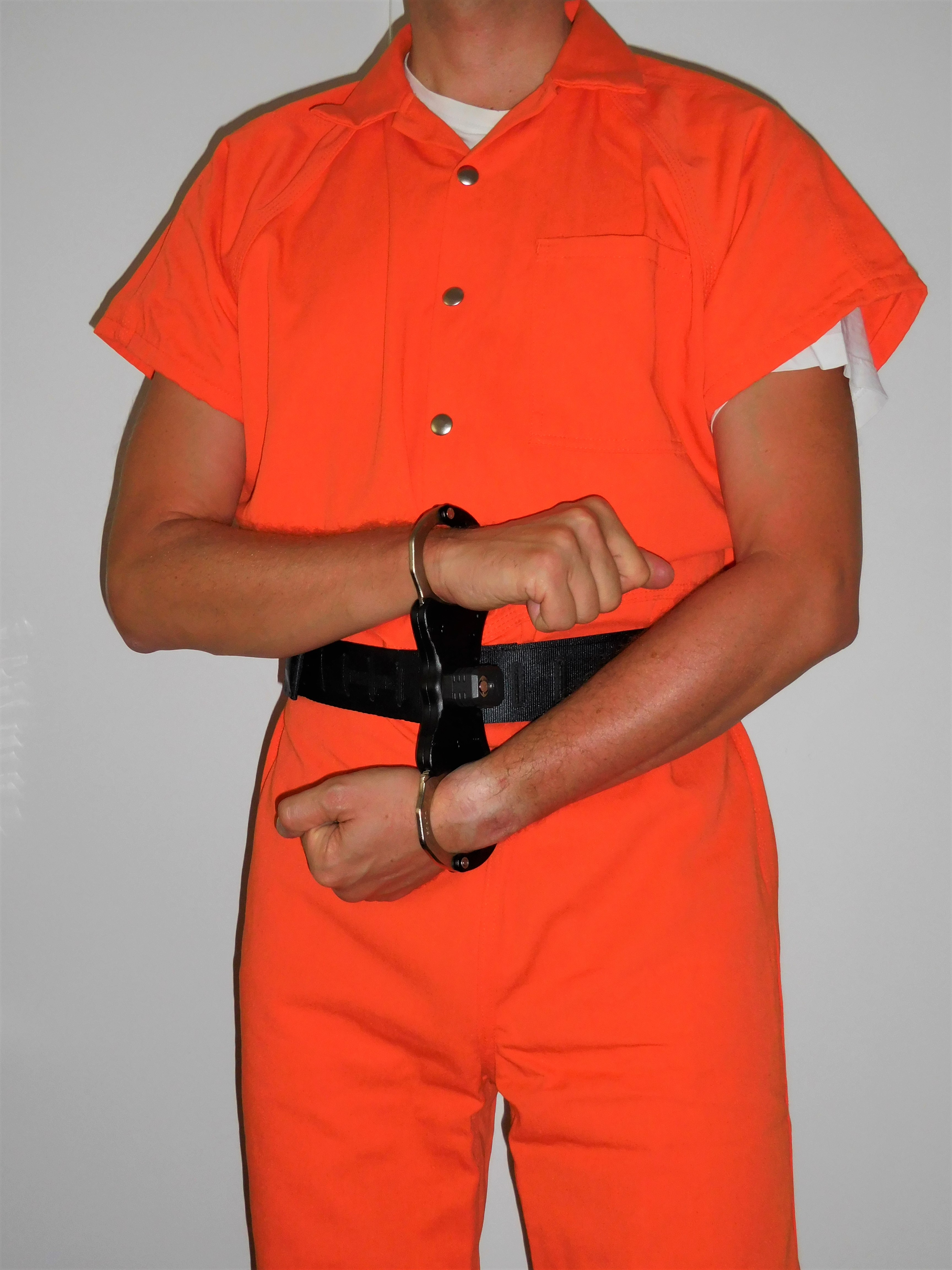
ASP transport kit in use

The company produces restraints such as handcuffs and plastic ties, 19 different types of flashlights, and other weapons accessories.
