= Miami Animal Police =

- Genre: Reality; Documentary; Crime; Mystery
- Narrated by: Rick Pasqualone
- Country of origin: United States
- Original language: English
- No. of episodes: 15

Production
- Production locations: Miami, Florida
- Camera setup: Multiple
- Running time: 45 minutes
- Production company: Lion Television

Original release
- Network: Animal Planet
- Release: January 5 – April 9, 2004

Miami Animal Police is an American documentary reality television series that premiered on January 5, 2004, on Animal Planet. Produced by Lion Television, the program is set in Miami, Florida and the surrounding Miami-Dade County. It depicts the everyday duties of Miami-Dade Police Department Animal Services Unit, focusing on the work of twenty ACOs (animal control officers), five civilian animal cruelty investigators, six Miami-Dade Police Department administrators, and a pitbull investigator.
