= Johnny Gat =

Recurring character in Saints Row

- Saints Row character
- Johnny Gat from Saints Row: The Third (2011)
- First appearance: Saints Row (2006)
- Last appearance: Agents of Mayhem (2017)
- Created by: Volition
- Designed by: Doug Nelson
- Voiced by: Daniel Dae Kim; Andres Velasco y Coll (Divekick)

Johnny Gat is a fictional character from Volition's Saints Row series of action-adventure video games. Voiced by American actor Daniel Dae Kim, the character was originally introduced in 2006's Saints Row as a lieutenant of the Third Street Saints, a street gang operating out of the Saint's Row district in the fictional city of Stilwater. He continued to make recurring appearances in the series as the loyal though trigger-happy right-hand man and best friend of the gang's leader, the player character. In 2015, Gat received the leading role for the first time in the series in Saints Row: Gat out of Hell, a standalone expansion to 2013's Saints Row IV.

The concept behind the character was not created with a lot of forethought, as the developers fleshed out a bare minimum amount of detail for his role within the 2006 video game's narrative. In spite of this, Johnny Gat has been acknowledged as one of the most beloved and iconic characters from the Saints Row series, with some critics lauding his characterization as layered and nuanced. The character's popularity has led to several crossover appearances outside of the Saints Row series.

== Concept and design ==
“Gat’s whole thing was, "We don’t really need a plan. We just need big guns. We’re going to go in there and be badasses because that’s just what we do."

— "Interview with Doug Nelson, Senior Designer on Saints Row".

Johnny Gat was named by Alvan Monje, a designer who worked on 2006's Saints Row, and who also came up with the name of the game and consequently the series it spawned. The character's name is based on the slang term for a firearm weapon, and is conceived as an archetype for "crazy violent fun". Doug Nelson, a designer and writer for the first game, was primarily responsible for developing the character's look and personality. Nelson's original image for Johnny Gat was of Jet Li, which he found after doing routine internet image searches to seek inspiration for the character.

Nelson wrote the initial framework of the first game's story. The first game's cast of characters were intentionally developed to be "one-note" in personality, with just enough narrative to get players to the gameplay. According to Nelson, his intention was ultimately to design a solid distribution of "good guys" and "bad guys" for the first game; the goal was to ensure that non-player characters are "immediately understandable" by the player so they are fully aware of the kind of gameplay present in Saints Row, and Johnny Gat in particular was intended to be "just a stab at some personality". Because Gat's character was meant to lack subtlety, the team found it easy to develop scenarios by simply envisioning how he would react to a hypothetical situation or cope with its specific circumstances.

Gat was originally written to be a foil for Dex, another gang member who would approach things in a very systematic way, and vice versa as Gat is inclined to behave recklessly or violently at the slightest provocation. In Nelson's original scenario for the first Saints Row, the player would have up to four factions to contend with via a dedicated lieutenant who would assign missions relevant to that faction, with Gat serving as the lieutenant for the Vice Kings. Aspects of Nelson's story framework were amended or removed entirely during development; because Gat's capture by the Vice Kings would restrict the player's access to undertake other gang missions until he is rescued, the character role in the aforementioned missions required adjustments by the developers. If the player does not prioritize Gat's rescue or is underprepared, Gat may be injured as a negative consequence.

Johnny Gat is voiced by Daniel Dae Kim for all appearances in the Saints Row series and its spin-off, Agents of Mayhem. Kim described voice acting as a unique skill employed by actors to portray characters using only their voices, akin to "different sounds and different melodies" created with a musical instrument. He has expressed an interest in reprising the role as long as the Saints Row series exists.

Gat is the first crossover character to appear in an updated edition of the 2013 fighting game Divekick developed by Iron Galaxy. Divekick producer Dave Lang explained that the idea first came up when a fan tweeted a suggestion about Johnny Gat's inclusion in Divekick to the official Divekick and Saints Row Twitter accounts. Further, his colleague Adam Heart had played through Saints Row IV shortly after Divekick launched, and enjoyed the "Saints of Rage" portion of the game. Staff from the Divekick and Saints Row social media accounts began communicating with each other before finalizing the collaboration.

== Appearances ==
=== Saints Row ===
In 2006's Saints Row, Johnny Gat is an established member of the Third Street Saints, a street gang operating out of the Saint's Row district in Stilwater that is dedicated to ending gang violence across the city. Gat is assigned by the Saints' leader, Julius Little, to target operations run by the Vice Kings, one of Stilwater's three main criminal syndicates, during which he is aided by the player character. Their efforts include blowing up the Vice Kings' recording studio using a car full of C4, and faking the death of Aisha, Gat's girlfriend and a popular R&B singer working for the Kings. In one instance, Gat proves his loyalty to the player by helping them escape an ambush and allowing himself to be captured and tortured after sustaining a gunshot to his leg. The player subsequently rescues Gat, and the two wipe out the Vice Kings after reaching an agreement with the gang's leader, Benjamin King, to kill his traitorous successor.

In 2008's Saints Row 2, set five years after the events of the first game, Gat is the only remaining member of the original Third Street Saints besides the player. Having been arrested after attempting to kill Troy Bradshaw, a former Saints lieutenant revealed to be an undercover cop, Gat is freed by the player and recruited into the new Third Street Saints. He serves as the player's second-in-command for most of the game, and his story arc focuses on his conflict with the Ronin, Stilwater's Yakuza cell. In a retaliatory attack against the Saints, the Ronin capture and kill Aisha, while Gat himself is wounded in a sword fight during his attempt to rescue her. Later, Gat exacts revenge by savagely beating and burying the Ronin's local leader, Shogo Akuji, alive at Aisha's funeral.

In 2011's Saints Row: The Third, the Saints are in full control of Stilwater after eliminating all opposition and have grown into a vast multimedia empire with their own brand. Gat remains a loyal member of the gang but disagrees with its new direction, remarking that "the Saints name used to mean more than body spray and some ass-tasting energy drink." The character meets his apparent demise early on in the game, during a confrontation with Belgian crime boss Phillipe Loren, and he is last heard over an intercom which is cut short by the sound of gunfire. The cast of characters frequently reference Gat's death throughout the game, and a funeral is held for him by the Saints. In the downloadable mission pack "The Trouble with Clones", a hulking clone of the original Gat, nicknamed "Johnny Tag", is created, going on a rampage until being reunited with a similar clone of Aisha.

In 2013's Saints Row IV, it is revealed that Gat did not perish during his encounter with Loren, but was instead abducted by Zinyak who saw him as a threat to his invasion plans and forced him to continuously relive Aisha's death via a simulation that his brain was plugged into. He is rescued by the player and rejoins the Saints, aiding in their efforts to defeat the aliens. In Gat out of Hell, a standalone expansion released in 2015, Satan kidnaps the player to force them to marry his daughter Jezebel, prompting Gat to travel to Hell with fellow Saint Kinzie Kensington to rescue them. After defeating Satan and rescuing the player, Gat is summoned by God, who allows him to choose his reward: be reunited with Aisha in Heaven, become the new ruler of Hell, recreate the Earth (which was previously destroyed by the aliens), find a new planet to rebuild humanity, or learn the secrets of the universe. Each option leads to the creation of a new timeline.

=== Other appearances ===
Johnny Gat appears as a playable character in Divekick, added via a free update in 2014. His special moves include the ability to call in cars, his Black Hole Launcher, and the Dubstep Gun.

Johnny Gat, along with the character's personal missions, unique skins, and voice acting by Daniel Dae Kim, was marketed as a pre-order bonus for Agents of Mayhem. The game's narrative is a direct continuation of the "recreate the Earth" ending of Gat out of Hell, where a new timeline was created. In this continuity, Ji-hoon "Johnny" Gat is a lieutenant in Seoul's Metropolitan Police Agency who falls into a coma during the events of "Devil's Night". Awakening one year later, Gat discovers that his department has been wiped out and replaced with C.O.P. (Civilian Overwatch Patrol) robot units, and joins the organization M.A.Y.H.E.M. to exact revenge on the supervillain group L.E.G.I.O.N. A game trailer released in June 2017 to promote Agents of Mayhem depicts a pose by Gat in reference to the Magnum, P.I. character.

== Reception ==
Johnny Gat became unexpectedly popular with players over the course of the Saints Row series, to the point where he is recognized as one of the series' most beloved and iconic characters. His return in Saints Row IV following his apparent death in Saints Row: The Third was attributed to popular demand, and was well received. Nelson expressed surprise at the character's enduring positive reception since he did not set out with the notion of creating a "strong iconic character". Jason O'Connell from Hardcore Gamer suggested that the character's "vicious badass nature" is the main reason he is beloved by players. The character is a popular subject of fan labor activities surrounding the series, such as fan art and cosplay.

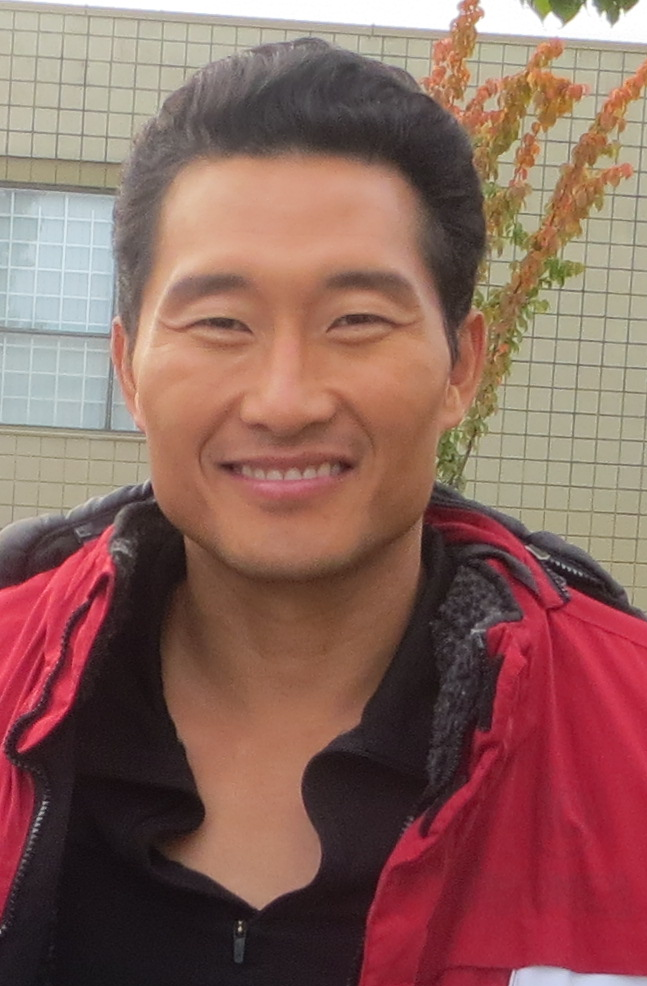
Daniel Dae Kim has been praised for his work as Johnny Gat.

Johnny Gat is considered to be Daniel Dae Kim's most notable role in the video game industry. Salehuddin Husin from GameAxis Unwired praised the voice acting work of Saints Row 2 as "top notch" and singled out Kim's performance, calling it a significant improvement over the first Saints Row. Macgregor said Gat comes across as a likeable man due to Kim's performance. In 2019, Alexis Ong from AsiaOne said it would be a "total waste" if Kim did not reprise his role in the planned live-action Saints Row film.

Some critics gave positive assessments of the character. Matt Liebl from GameZone as well as Sam Prell from Engadget noted that Johnny Gat does have redeeming qualities, such as his loyalty and devotion both to the Saints gang and to Aisha, in spite of his "outwardly violent nature". In a retrospective assessment of the character, Jody Macgregor from Rock, Paper, Shotgun called Gat a mascot for Saints Row as he represents a "celebration of open-world games as consequence-free romps", and a symbol of the series' point of difference to its competitors. To O'Connell, deep inside the character's psyche is a "tortured and multi-layered soul that at heart is a pretty good guy trying to make a difference the only way he knows how". He argued that Johnny Gat is the most relatable and complex of the Saints Row universe's cast of characters, and that his story arc, which is filled with numerous implausible or outrageous scenarios, has arrived at "a special place in gaming history, but for all the wrong reasons". He opined that Gat's "reasons for resorting to violence are understandable and can be considered noble", as his overall goal is to end the gang wars that are tearing his home district apart and ensure its safety by bringing it under the rule of his gang. O'Connell also cited Aisha's funeral in Saints Row 2, which culminated in the "Get up" cutscene involving a vengeful Gat, to be an emotionally impactful moment. Guinness World Records praised Gat's slick dress sense and called him "so cool he could do with an hour in the sauna". NextShark called Johnny Gat a notable example of an Asian-American male character "done right in video games", highlighting the fact that his depiction as a sexually desirable tough guy "who strikes fear into the hearts of the most powerful beings in the universe" is a subversion of media stereotypes of Asian men in Western media.

On the other hand, Kris Ligman from Unwinnable called Johnny Gat "a sociopathic clown who seemed disruptive a decade ago but now seems as quaintly conventional in our playing vocabulary as hurling furious avians into porcine blobs". Ligman highlighted and discussed Gat's role in Saints Row IV within the context of retroseriality, and found that the more she replayed the game, the more she realized that her fascination with the character's "lone wolf act and carefully cultivated brutal masculinity" is in fact a "scar tissue" of who and what he used to be. Ligman claimed that, while Gat is largely a caricature of murderous protagonists from the Grand Theft Auto video game series, such character archetypes had ceased to be interesting, shocking or funny by the 2010s. In her view, Gat and his contemporaries like the protagonists of Grand Theft Auto V or Duke Nukem have lost relevancy with "modern players", a particularly significant point in Saints Row IV where the player character can manifest superpowers and outclasses Gat in every way. In 2021, James Troughton from TheGamer opined that the then-upcoming fifth entry in the Saints Row series could succeed without an appearance from Gat or any other recurring characters as they "had their time to shine".
