= Divekick =

2D competitive fighting game

- Developers: Iron Galaxy; One True Game Studios
- Publisher: Iron Galaxy
- Designer: Adam Heart
- Artist: Anna Heart
- Composer: Harrison Pretat
- Engine: PhyreEngine
- Platforms: Windows, PlayStation 3, PlayStation 4, Vita, Xbox One
- Release: PS3, Vita, Windows: EU: August 20, 2013; NA: August 20, 2013; PS4, Xbox One: WW: October 7, 2014
- Genre: Fighting
- Modes: Single-player, multiplayer

Divekick is a 2D competitive fighting game originally developed by One True Game Studios, an independent collective of competitive gamers. A demo of the game was showcased at several competitive events, and after a positive reaction, the group created a Kickstarter campaign to fund the creation of a full version for release on Microsoft Windows. The Kickstarter project was canceled after it was announced that developer Iron Galaxy Studios had agreed to co-develop and release the game.

The name "Divekick" is a reference to a common mechanic in many fighting games in which some characters can jump in the air and do a diving kick with a sudden increase in momentum. In fighting games, dive kicks are usually very powerful, abusable tactics. The gameplay in Divekick revolves entirely around this mechanic. Various aspects of the game, such as its character roster, also serve to satirize other fighting games and fighting game community culture. The game was released for PlayStation 3, PlayStation Vita, and Microsoft Windows via Steam Greenlight on August 20, 2013 in English-speaking regions. The game was released in Japan on September 17, 2014.

A major balance update to the game, titled Divekick: Addition Edition, was released in April 2014, and a port of the game for PlayStation 4 and Xbox One, titled Divekick: Addition Edition +, was released on October 7, 2014.

== Gameplay ==
Pre-release gameplay featuring the characters Dive and Kick. The foot-shaped Kick Meters at the bottom of the screen indicate how much energy can be used to perform special moves.

Divekick is a comedic parody of fighting game motifs and contains many humorous references to games (especially those in the Street Fighter franchise) as well as inside jokes from within the competitive fighting game community. Unlike most fighting games, which are played using many buttons for many different kinds of movement and attacks, Divekick is played using only two buttons, Dive and Kick. Pressing Dive causes the character to perform a vertical jump, with each character having different jump height and speed. After Diving, the player can press the Kick button to perform a diving kick, with each character kicking at a different speed and angle. Pressing Kick while standing performs a backward evasive hop for most characters called a "kickback". Using these moves is the only way to move, evade, attack, and dodge. Performing a divekick will partly fill a Kick Meter displayed at the bottom of the screen. This meter can be partially expended to perform a special move, activated by pressing both buttons at once. Each character has two unique special moves: one used on the ground, and one used in the air. By performing a kick when the Kick Meter is filled entirely, players will activate "Kick Factor", a reference to the "X-Factor" mechanic in Ultimate Marvel vs. Capcom 3. Kick Factor gives the player a temporary speed boost and a slightly more advantageous kicking angle. Some characters also gain special properties, such as invulnerability, while in Kick Factor.

The game features a health bar for each player, but it is only there for humorous and stylistic purposes, as the round is lost after being hit only once. If a player wins a round by kicking an opponent directly in the head, called a "Head Shot" in reference to first-person shooters, that player will be considered "Concussed." A Concussion empties the player's Kick Meter and reduces their character's speed and jump height for a few seconds at the beginning of the next round. Kick Meter cannot be regained until Concussion ends.

Before each match, the players are allowed to choose a gem, a parody of Street Fighter X Tekken's gems. There are four different gems, each with a different special effect such as increasing kick speed or increasing Kick Meter gain. The beta version of the game included an unselectable "DLC" gem which would drastically buff the character if it were available, parodying Capcom's controversial strategy of forcing users to pay for additional DLC that is already written onto the game disc.

The game includes a mechanic known as "Hold the Line" to reduce the potential of draws due to the timer expiring. In the final seconds of the round a vertical red line will appear in the center of the stage, and if the timer runs out, the character who is closest to the line will be declared the winner. If both players are of equal distance to the line, the god of Divekicking's giant foot will crush both players, taking away whatever meter they have, and a draw will be declared.

=== Miscellaneous ===
Fraud Detection, a reference to an inside joke within the competitive fighting game community wherein a player who does not perform as well as expected is labeled a "fraud." If a player loses four games in a row without winning one, the game will activate a "Fraud Detection Warning". Losing afterwards will announce "Fraud Detected", but winning will avert it.

Choke Detection, a reference to another inside joke within the competitive fighting game community in which a player does well initially, pushing the other player to an overwhelming degree, only to lose the rest of the match, stating that he "choked." When a player is put into "Fraud Detection Warning", averts it, then wins four rounds in a row afterwards, the game will activate a "Choke Detection Warning". Like Fraud Detection, the game will announce "Choke Detected" if he loses and avert it if he does win the round, and thus the match.

Double KO, an act where both players manage to kick each other at both players' hitboxes. The round is considered a draw and no points are awarded to either player and will take either player out of Kick Factor and Concussion. If both players manage to get a Double KO at least twice in a row, the game will declare the match "Staged", a reference to players who go into matches with a pre-determined outcome causing drama for the intention of entertaining crowds or both players decide not to take said match seriously, especially if both players decide to split the pot winnings (often referred to as collusion).

== Characters ==
The game features a roster of 15 characters. Each character's appearance, stance, and animations are inspired by famous fighting game characters who are known for having a dive kick. The characters vary in speed, jump height, and kick angle, making some match-ups more advantageous than others.

- Dive, a student of Uncle Sensei's Bel Air Divekicking dojo who was raised in West Philadelphia. After getting in a fight, he and his brother were sent by their mother to live in Bel Air with Uncle Sensei. He enjoys math and uses it to improve his diving. He is a parody of the character Yang from the Street Fighter franchise.
- Kick, another student of Uncle Sensei's dojo and Dive's fraternal twin brother. He prefers to focus on his kicking and hopes to launch his own music career. Kick is a parody of the character Yun from the Street Fighter franchise, and many of his quotes and catchphrases in the game are inspired by actor Will Smith. Kick has since appeared in other indie fighting games, including Indie Pogo and Pocket Rumble.
- Mr. N, a Divekicker who once rigged a bracket in a tournament, resulting in a mass disqualification of all the players, the cancellation of the tournament, and the end of Uncle Sensei's Divekicking career. He is notorious for his shady dealings in tournaments and is often found around his best friend, star Divekicker Dustin Weinburger. He is constantly on the run from the mob, to whom he owes money. Mr. N is a parody of the character Rufus from the Street Fighter franchise and professional gamer Martin "Marn" Phan.
- Redacted (stylized as ~~Redacted~~), a pregnant skunk bear who drank toxic waste while fleeing from Canada, resulting in her size and intelligence being increased. She followed the scent of Uncle Sensei's cigars to Bel Air, where she currently resides with three kits. Her animations are inspired by those of Wolverine as he appears in Marvel vs. Capcom 3. In early versions of the game, her name was simply Wolverine, referencing her fighting game inspiration as well as her species; but it was later changed, likely for legal reasons. As a result, her name itself is a joke referencing legal disputes between intellectual property owners and independent game developers who use the appearance and likeness of the intellectual properties in games.
- Kung Pao, a Divekicking champion from the parallel dimension of Downworld who was part of a rebellion against her stepfather, Theodore Khan. Having landed in the game's dimension due to kicking a hole in the fabric of the universe, she seeks to return to her own world. Kung Pao is a parody of Kung Lao from the Mortal Kombat franchise.
- Dr. Victoria Shoals, an expert podiatrist who researches a foot infection found in Divekickers called Ped Urino, or "Foot Dive." After she contracts the disease on her face, she dons a mask and metal boots to enter Divekicking competitions in an effort to find a cure. Dr. Shoals is a female parody of Doctor Doom as he appears in Marvel vs. Capcom 3, while her name is a reference to the Dr. Scholl's footcare company.
- Uncle Sensei, Dive's and Kick's master and maternal uncle who wears boots over his hands as well as his feet, changing "stances" after every kick. Becoming interested in Divekicking at a young age, he opened his own dojo and entered his first tournament upon returning from the Invasion of Grenada. Despite expanding the sport's popularity with a 10-year win streak, he was forced into retirement after Mr. N rigged the brackets of a tournament he was attending, leaving him bankrupt. He now makes what little money he can training Divekicking students at his dojo, including his nephews. Uncle Sensei's character is a parody of Gen from the Street Fighter series due to his relationship with Dive and Kick, which is a parallel to Gen's relationship with Yun and Yang. He is also able to change fighting stances which is a unique ability that Gen possesses. He has a scarred chest from fighting Redacted, which is a parody of Sagat from the Street Fighter series, who is depicted as having a scarred chest from his first battle with Ryu. One of his kicks is inspired by that of Akuma from Street Fighter, and his diving hands-first resembles Alex's Flying Crosschop in Street Fighter III.
- Alex Jefailey, a fighting game tournament organizer whose head grows bigger with every round he wins. He runs a popular series of tournaments known as "Jefailey Effort Orlando" (JEO). He controversially enters his own events but does so only to encourage people to continue attending his events. His large ego has turned friends against him. He is based on fighting game event organizer Alex Jebailey, who contributed to the Kickstarter to have a character with his likeness included, with a dropkick inspired by Mike Haggar of Final Fight. Jebailey would later become Iron Galaxy's community manager from January 2014 to May 2016.
- The Baz, a man born on a mountain under a blood red moon, who is so awesome that he defecates lightning. While an excellent fighter, he has been rejected from league tournaments for looking too stupid, so he joins the Divekicking league due to its lack of standards. Having made no money yet, the Baz takes a job tracking down Mr. N as a bounty hunter for the mob. He is heavily invested in rope whips and ripped gym shirts. His kicks are based on Taskmaster and Zero as they appear in Marvel vs. Capcom 3, with his appearance based on a rejected Street Fighter II character design spotlighted and repeatedly referenced on the Machinima series Fighterpedia and Super Best Friends Play. Series creators Matthew Kowalewski and Woolie Madden donated to the Kickstarter to have The Baz added as a playable character. The character's abilities were heavily revised in Addition Edition. The Baz has since gone on to appear in other games backed by Kowalewski and Madden, such as Shovel Knight and Indivisible, utilizing many of his moves from Divekick.
- Markman, an inventor who has just created the "Kickbox", a precision control item which gives users more control over their divekicking. He intends to show the world the power of the Kickbox by entering Divekicking tournaments while using it, hoping sales will increase as a result. The character is a fictionalized version of former Mad Catz Community and Sponsorship Manager Mark Julio; while his playstyle is derived from that of Phoenix Wright in Ultimate Marvel vs. Capcom 3 and Kazuya Mishima in Tekken.
- Stream, a straitjacket-wearing monster who lives in a prison made of keyboards, constantly fed free content through a monitor, only to react with harsh negativity, as doing so is the only thing which brings him joy. He breaks out of his prison to troll Divekick tournaments in person. He bears a strong resemblance to Firebrand as he appears in Ultimate Marvel vs. Capcom 3, and satirizes the concept of "stream monsters," users who leave scathing commentary in the chat rooms of fighting game live streams, yet never entering tournaments themselves. The divekick itself is inspired by Street Fighter's Dhalsim.
- Codename: S-Kill, the game's final boss. He is the leader of a criminal organization bent on "rebalancing" the world in the hopes of repackaging and selling it anew. However, realizing those in charge had not yet successfully rebalanced professional Divekicking, he emerges to do it himself. He is a fictionalized version of professional fighting gamer and former Capcom community manager Seth Killian. S-Kill's teleportation ability and divekick are derived from those of Seth from Street Fighter IV, who was named after Killian. He also has a parry similar to those in Street Fighter III.
- Kenny, an angel who was killed at a young age. After barely losing to Dustin Weinburger in his first Divekicking competition, Kenny died later that day when Mr. N filled his shoes with Foot Dive bacteria. Though Mr. N was acquitted, Kenny won five consecutive Divekick tournaments in Heaven, and in recognition of his achievements, the god of Divekicking granted him a second chance to fight in the mortal world. Having spent time in heaven watching professional Divekicking tournaments down on Earth, he quickly learned to imitate the divekicks of the other fighters. Each round, Kenny imitates the dive and kick of a different fighter, chosen at random; however, he has his own unique special move, the Spirit Bullet, that remains consistent. Kenny was added at the request of a Kickstarter backer, who paid to have a character developed as a tribute to his deceased brother. The real-life Kenny's love of selecting the "Random Character" option in fighting games inspired the character's random copycat ability, similar to other copycat characters like Mokujin from Tekken and Edgemaster from Soulcalibur.
- Johnny Gat, a major character in Volition's Saints Row video game franchise. Set during the events of Saints Row IV, Gat's story sees him using the simulation to try and enter Uncle Sensei's mind, hoping to find a way to take control and defeat the Zin. Gat's kicks are derived from those he used in Saints Row IV's "Saints of Rage" minigame, and can use the Black Hole Launcher from the same game as his air special. During Kick Factor, fellow Saints Row character Shaundi will appear and assist Gat using the Dubstep Gun, also from Saints Row IV. Following the insertion of a reference to Divekick in Saints Row IV and interactions between Iron Galaxy and Volition over Twitter, Volition suggested Gat be included as part of the Divekick roster. Gat was not part of the initial release and was added as a special guest character in Addition Edition +.
- The Fencer, the player character in Mark "Messhof" Essen's indie fighting game Nidhogg, who is inexplicably sent to the world of Divekick after being eaten by the eponymous creature. The Fencer uses his kick from his game of origin, and has constant access to his ground and air specials, allowing him to throw his sword at the opponent and perform tumbles to dodge if not holding a sword. If the Fencer activates Kick Factor, he has the chance to win the match if he reaches the opposite end of the screen before his meter runs out, similar to the mechanics of Nidhogg. The Fencer was not part of the initial release and was added as a special guest character in the game's final update on November 24, 2015.

== Reception ==
Reception

Aggregate score
| Aggregator | Score |
|---|---|
| Metacritic | PC: 73/100; PS3: 65/100; VITA: 70/100 |

Review scores
| Publication | Score |
|---|---|
| Destructoid | 9/10 |
| Edge | 6/10 |
| Game Informer | 6.5/10 |
| GameRevolution | 2.5/5 |
| GameSpot | 7/10 |
| GamesRadar+ | 3/5 |
| GameTrailers | 7.7/10 |
| IGN | 7/10 |
| Joystiq | 2/5 |
| Official U.S. PlayStation Magazine | 80% |

Awards
| Publication | Award |
|---|---|
| Destructoid | Best Fighting Game of 2013 |
| Machinima, EGM, PSU.com | Best Fighting Game of E3 2013 |

Official PlayStation Magazine Benelux said it was "A fighting game with subpar graphics and just one attack should not get more than 10/100, but it actually is pretty fun. When playing multiplayer." IGN said "It is unfortunate that there's not a better single-player mode, and more unfortunate that Divekick's cultural insensitivity can be downright cringe-worthy, but it's still a successful experiment in simplified fighting." GameSpot said "Divekick's single-player game is lacking, but this two-button brawler turns into feet-flying fun with friends." Game Informer said "In the right environment and with the right people, Divekick offers some fun. But the lack of online lobbies drastically limits those opportunities. Like most novelties, the fun of Divekick is short-lived." Edge said "What had the potential to showcase to the uninitiated what makes fighting games so special has become a game aimed too squarely at those who already know." GamesRadar said "Though the path to boot-stomping nirvana is fraught with flaws, Divekick succeeds at simplifying high-level concepts into a bite-sized experience that only gets better with time." Joystiq said "Maybe Divekick is the future of fighting games. Maybe the hardcore tournament set really does want a fighter so barebones that it's basically marrow. Everyone else would be better served going elsewhere for their virtual pugilism fix."

During the 17th Annual D.I.C.E. Awards, the Academy of Interactive Arts & Sciences (AIAS) nominated Divekick for "Fighting Game of the Year".
