= Jason L. Blair =

American writer and game designer

- Born: Painesville, Ohio, U.S.
- Occupations: Writer, game designer
- Years active: 2001–present
- Notable work: Little Fears, Agents of Mayhem
- Website: jasonlblair.com

Jason L. Blair is an American writer and game designer, best known for his work on the roleplaying game Little Fears.

== Career ==
After the release of the award-winning tabletop roleplaying game Little Fears in 2001, Blair wrote for various other publishers and published an urban magic game through Key 20 titled Wyrd is Bond.

Blair's Key 20 Publishing and Adept Press sponsored a booth for The Forge at Gen Con in 2002 to appeal to enthusiasts of indie role-playing games.

He eventually joined Human Head Studios as their Adventure Games Director where he led the development and publication of the board game Frankenstein's Children, the card game Villainy, and the 1950s B-movie roleplaying game Normal, Texas while also assisting on the script for the video game Prey.

After leaving Human Head, Blair primarily freelanced for a variety of video game studios. He also continued to develop and publish his own tabletop work such as Streets of Bedlam (using the Savage Worlds system) and Little Fears Nightmare Edition.

In 2012, he joined video game developer Volition Inc where he worked on Saints Row IV and Agents of Mayhem.

After a brief stint as Creative Director at Funcom’s US office, he joined High Voltage Software in 2019.

His work has been nominated for multiple awards from IGN, ENnie, Indie RPG Awards, and Origins Awards.
