= Saints Row: Undercover =

- Developer: Volition
- Platform: PlayStation Portable
- Release: January 28, 2016

Saints Row: Undercover (originally titled Saints Row: The Fall) is a story-based game in the Saints Row series developed by Volition for the PlayStation Portable. Originally cancelled after being in development in 2009, a development build of the game was eventually released free of charge by Volition in 2016, in ISO format through the website Unseen64.

The game involves playing as a corrupt undercover policeman in the city of Stilwater, with the goal of completing various missions around the city.
