= Saints Row (2006 video game) =

2006 action-adventure game

- North American cover art
- Developer: Volition
- Publisher: THQ
- Producer: Jacques Hennequet
- Designer: Chris Stockman
- Programmer: Alan Lawrance
- Artist: Matt Flegel
- Writer: Steve Jaros
- Series: Saints Row
- Platform: Xbox 360
- Release: NA: August 29, 2006; AU: August 31, 2006; EU: September 1, 2006
- Genre: Action-adventure
- Modes: Single-player, multiplayer

Saints Row is a 2006 action-adventure game developed by Volition and published by THQ exclusively for the Xbox 360. It was released in North America on August 29, 2006, followed by an Australian release two days later and a European release on September 1, 2006. Set within the fictional city of Stilwater, based on Detroit, the single-player story follows a player-created character who joins the 3rd Street Saints gang after they save his life, and helps them rise to prominence by undermining enemy criminal syndicates, while slowly building up his own reputation within the gang. The storyline is non-linear and divided into three separate story arcs for each rival gang the player must defeat.

Story missions are unlocked by trading in "Respect" points, currency earned by completing minigames and side-missions. Outside of the main story, players can freely roam Stilwater, consisting of two main islands. The game is played from a third-person perspective and its world is navigated on-foot or by vehicle. Players can fight enemies using a variety of firearms, and call in non-playable gang members to assist them. An online multiplayer mode allows multiple players to engage in a variety of cooperative and competitive game modes.

Saints Row received positive reviews upon release, with many critics favorably comparing it to the Grand Theft Auto series. It also did well financially, selling over 1 million copies by the end of 2006. Its success launched the Saints Row franchise, starting with Saints Row 2 in October 2008.

== Gameplay ==
At the beginning of the game, players create their character through a system that allows them to customize his ethnicity, fitness, face and hairstyle. After completing the first mission, players are given free roam over the game's open world, the fictional city of Stilwater, which is modeled after Baltimore, Detroit, and Chicago. The game makes use of a third-person view, which allows players to freely rotate the camera around their character. Players can run, jump, swim or utilize cars to navigate the world. They may also access the character customization system again at a plastic surgeon to apply cosmetic changes to their character. They can further alter the appearance of their character at clothing stores, tattoo parlors, barbers and jewelers, and tune vehicles at chop shops. A personal garage can be used to store customized vehicles, and vehicles that have been destroyed or lost can be redeemed for a cash fee.

Excluding the introductory and epilogue mission sequences, missions in Saints Row are divided between three linear story arcs which can be progressed through simultaneously or one by one, each with the objective of extinguishing a rival gang. Players engage in these missions at their leisure, but a prerequisite to instigate a mission is that they have filled up a bar on their Respect meter. Respect is a currency earned by completing activities, which are minigames scattered across the world with increasing levels of difficulty. Missions and activities also accrue the player's cash income, which can be spent on goods and services such as weapons and clothes. Should players fail a mission, they may instantly reattempt it without incurring a loss of their Respect points. Cinemas scattered throughout the game world allow players to replay missions an unlimited number of times.

A player fires at traffic with an RPG launcher.

Players use hand-to-hand combat, melee weapons, firearms, and explosives to fight rival gangs and the police. A free aiming reticule appears on the screen while players have weapons equipped. Weapons are accessed by a "weapon wheel" inventory system that appears on the screen as players hold down a button. Each of the eight slots on the wheel corresponds to different types of weapons, such as submachine guns and pistols. Players may only carry one of each type of weapon at a time. Saints Row makes use of regenerative health, but this process can be accelerated by eating fast food items.

A "wanted level" system governs the response by opposing forces to players' aggressive actions. In the head-up display, surrounding the minimap, there are two bars; the topmost bar represents rival gangs and the bottommost bar represents the police. As players incite opposing forces, the corresponding bar fills up. Each bar filled is represented by the provoked enemy's logo, be it a star to represent the police or a "gang sign" to represent an enemy gang. One bar of notoriety will result in non-lethal retaliation. However, two, three, four or five bars of notoriety will result in a gradually increased lethal response. Notoriety depletes over time, but enemies will continue to be aggressive towards players until the meter recedes. Players may remove their notoriety instantly by utilizing drive-through confessional booths, visiting plastic surgeons, or inputting cheat codes. If arrested by the police, players will reappear outside a police station with a small bounty collected from their earnings.

Player progression through the game directly affects the presence of their friendly gang, the 3rd Street Saints. The game world is subdivided between districts, such as the Red Light or Downtown districts, each comprising several neighborhoods. Each neighborhood is controlled by a rival gang, but as players complete missions, the 3rd Street Saints will take over neighborhoods, causing members of the gang to spawn there. The pause menu displays a large map of the game world, which allows players to view a graphical representation of the streetscape, and a color filter over each neighborhood represents the gang that controls it (purple for the Saints, yellow for the Kings, red for the Carnales, and blue for the Rollerz). Saints Row features an in-game GPS navigation device, which allows players to set waypoints with a directional line indicating the quickest route to the marked destination. Players may enlist allied forces, referred to as "homies", to aid in combat. Generic members of the 3rd Street Saints may be summoned, or players may call up unique homies on their in-game mobile phone. Players can further utilize their phone to contact services such as taxicabs, call other numbers scattered throughout the map on billboards, or input cheat codes in the game.

== Plot ==
Saints Row opens in 2006 in Stilwater, a city suffering from gang warfare at the hands of three distinct criminal syndicates: the Vice Kings, an African-American gang that primarily earns revenue from strip clubs, brothels and record labels; Los Carnales, a Hispanic drug cartel that dominates the narcotics trade and gun-running; and the Westside Rollerz, a gang consisting of Caucasian and Asian members who operate on the lucrative underground racing club. The player character (Kenny Blank, Joe Camareno, or Andrew Kishino), a random bystander, becomes caught in a crossfire between the three gangs, but is saved by Troy Bradshaw (Michael Rapaport), a member of a smaller multiracial gang called the 3rd Street Saints which is dedicated to controlling violence in Stilwater. Saints leader Julius Little (Keith David) initiates the player into the gang and has them prove themselves by reclaiming the district of Saint's Row, before assigning them to work under his top lieutenants, Johnny Gat (Daniel Dae Kim), Dexter "Dex" Jackson (JAQ) and Lin (Tia Carrere), to wipe out each rival gang.

Gat focuses on hitting operations owned by the Vice Kings, including faking the death of their key asset – Gat's girlfriend and famed R&B singer Aisha (Sy Smith) – which culminates in the gang's leader, Benjamin King (Michael Clarke Duncan), being betrayed by his underlings for refusing to respond to the Saints' actions. After Julius has him rescued, King agrees to retire his gang in exchange for the Saints' help in killing his traitorous successor: former Vice Kings madam Tanya Winters (Mila Kunis). Meanwhile, Dex focuses on the Carnales by enlisting the player's help to take over their drug operations and ultimately kill their leaders, brothers Hector (Joaquim de Almeida) and Angelo Lopez (Freddy Rodriguez), while also securing a deal with the gang's chief Colombian supplier, Manuel Orejuela (Carlos Ferro). Concurrently, Lin works undercover amongst the Rollerz, eventually learning that the gang is led by street racer Joseph Price (Gregory Sims) and his uncle, wealthy private attorney William Sharp (David Carradine). After Sharp deduces that Lin is a mole and has her killed, the player exacts revenge by killing Sharp and Price.

With the city now under the Saints' control, Julius has the player promoted to his chief lieutenant. Shortly thereafter, however, Stilwater's corrupt police chief, Richard Monroe, has Julius arrested and threatens his life to force the player to kill Stilwater's mayor, Marshal Winslow, on behalf of his opponent, Alderman Richard Hughes (Clancy Brown). The player assassinates Winslow, but Monroe refuses to free Julius, leading the Saints to organize an ambush to kill Monroe and rescue Julius. After winning the mayoral election, Hughes invites the player to his private yacht, where he reveals his intentions to have the Saints arrested and Saint's Row sold to private developers after being razed. Meanwhile, Troy is revealed to have been an undercover cop working to disband the Saints, and Julius watches the yacht from a distance before leaving. As Hughes orders the player's execution, the yacht explodes, seemingly killing everyone onboard.

== Development ==
Volition began work on Saints Row in 2003, as a PlayStation 2 game under the title Bling Bling.

Design director Christopher Stockman acknowledged that the bulk of Saints Row was a "ripoff" of Grand Theft Auto III (2001), and borrowed many of the ideas from the game. Stockman saw that at the time, shortly after the launch of the Xbox 360, there was very little competition for games on the platform, so bringing a Grand Theft Auto-like game at that time would be an opportunity. In retrospective, Stockman said that if the game had come out after Grand Theft Auto IV in 2008, it would not have been as successful. To distinguish itself from Grand Theft Auto, the design philosophy behind Saints Row's arcing mission structure was to provide players with more freedom in how they interact with the open world. By developing three story arcs, the team wanted to provide a nonlinear approach by allowing players to progress through the story at their leisure. Adhering to such a design philosophy created a challenge for the team, as they had to balance the open-ended nature of the mission structure with a story progression that felt natural and player-engaging. "Stories, by definition, are fairly linear, so the two goals conflicted with each other", Stockman opined.

During development, the team turned to earlier open world games to establish principles for innovation, adopting the design philosophy "everything matters". The team wanted to synthesise game mechanics together to make the missions, activities and customization options work in tandem. Stockman felt that previous open world games did not reward players for experimenting with the sandbox enough because story progression was siphoned off from free roam gameplay. From this sentiment, the concept of the activities developed; players in Saints Row would be encouraged into off-mission content because progression through activities would unlock more story missions. The team would conduct review meetings to assess how the activities developed and whether or not refinements would need to be made. Some activities went through larger design changes than others; in an earlier inception of Drug Trafficking, players would have driven around the city providing addicts with narcotics while under the pressure of a time limit. Concurrently, the team were making refinements to defensive sequences in the story missions, which influenced the final revision of the Drug Trafficking activity.

Developing the city of Stilwater required scaling back revisions to appropriate for a play space that could be comfortably traversed. During early production, the team rendered an elementary model of the city in the engine, and drove around it to get a sense of the city's scale. They found the revision too small, so they quadrupled its dimensions, but soon had to scale it back to a more manageable size. Having found an appropriate size, the team began working on the city in detail, adding in transportation networks and buildings. The team made further revisions during this process as necessary, balancing the number of interior models like shops and mission-related buildings in each district so that no one section of the city would feel denser than another. Some districts planned for the city, such as an indoor shopping mall, a train station, and a trailer park, were cut during development and would be reused in Saints Row 2.

A PlayStation 3 port of Saints Row was announced to be in development in February 2007 before being cancelled in May of that year, once Saints Row 2 was confirmed. A Wii port was also being developed by Mass Media, Inc. before being similarly cancelled.

== Soundtrack ==
The soundtrack of Saints Row includes over 130 musical tracks covering the classical, easy listening, drum and bass/breakbeat, metal, reggae, rock, R&B and hip hop genres. The music is presented by 12 radio stations, and there is an in-game music player accessible through the pause menu. The player purchases songs for the music player at the record store franchise "Scratch That Music" in Stilwater using in-game money.

== Downloadable content ==
Several packages of downloadable content (DLC) were released for Saints Row. They are as follows:

- Funky Fresh Pack – adds sixty exclusive clothing and accessory options
- Industrial Map Pack – adds a new map for use in competitive multiplayer modes
- Ho Ho Ho Pack – adds Christmas-themed costumes and hairstyles
- Gankster Pack – adds two exclusive vehicles and a co-op mission
- Exclusive Unkut Pack – adds Unkut-themed outfits and tattoos

As of 2013, the DLCs are no longer available for purchase on the Xbox Live network. They were re-introduced on July 29, 2015.

== Reception ==
Prior to the retail version of Saints Row being released, the demo set an Xbox Live Marketplace then-record for being downloaded more than 350,000 times in the first week of its release.

Reception

Aggregate score
Aggregator	Score
Metacritic	81/100

Review scores
Publication	Score
Edge	6/10
Electronic Gaming Monthly	7.67/10
Eurogamer	7/10
Famitsu	34/40
Game Informer	8.75/10
GamePro	4.75/5
GameRevolution	B
GameSpot	8.3/10
GameSpy	4/5
GameTrailers	8/10
GameZone	8.7/10
IGN	8.5/10
Official Xbox Magazine (US)	8/10
Detroit Free Press	4/4
The Times	5/5

The game received "favorable" reviews according to the review aggregation website Metacritic. Reviewers likened Saints Row to the Grand Theft Auto series; some felt the game improved upon the gameplay of Grand Theft Auto, but others criticized its lack of originality. Steven Embling of play.tm wrote that while the game "isn't going to win any awards for originality", its graphics and sound design were "impressive" and "highly commendable". Ryan McCaffrey of GamesRadar+ considered the game a worthy entry into a genre beholden to Grand Theft Auto, praising its graphics and use of the Havok engine, but lamenting the Respect system for disrupting story progression. Will Tuttle of GameSpy considered that while not all players would respond positively to the Respect system necessitating mission progression, the Activities "offer some of the game's most memorable sequences". Scott Sharkey of 1UP.com noted that Saints Row removed frustrating elements from previous Grand Theft Auto games, like load times between city sections and combat reliant on auto-aim, but considered its attempts to recreate urban gang culture and satire "so hackneyed that they cast an embarrassing shadow over the whole thing". In Japan, where the game was ported for release on June 21, 2007, Famitsu gave it a score of one nine, two eights, and one nine for a total of 34 out of 40.

Detroit Free Press gave the game a score of a full four stars and said it was "the deepest and most exciting to date of all the freewheeling street shooter games. There are missions and activities galore." The Times similarly gave it a full five stars and said, "This is a game guaranteed to offend and entertain in equal measure, but it is emphatically not for children." The Sydney Morning Herald gave it four stars out of five and said that the game "lacks the clever subtlety and fun-loving sense of mischief of Grand Theft Auto, with much of its humour falling flat. But there's plenty of fun to be had while waiting for the real deal (GTA IV) to be released in October next year." 411Mania gave it a score of 7.5 out of 10 and said it was "as addictive and guilty-as-sin fun as the game it imitates, and this is one case where imitation is the best form of flattery." The A.V. Club similarly gave it a B and called it "the perfect thug sim for your younger siblings."

Saints Row received awards from GameSpot for "Most Surprisingly Good Game of 2006", as well as Gaming Target for one of "52 Games We'll Still Be Playing From 2006" selection. During the 10th Annual Interactive Achievement Awards, the Academy of Interactive Arts & Sciences nominated Saints Row for "Action/Adventure Game of the Year", "Outstanding Achievement in Character Performance - Female" (Tia Carrere as Lin), and "Outstanding Achievement in Story and Character Development".

Saints Row sold over 2 million copies, and has since joined the Xbox 360 lineup of "Platinum Hits" games.

== Legacy ==
The success of Saints Row led to a series of sequels, beginning with Saints Row 2 in October 2008. It was followed by Saints Row: The Third in November 2011, and Saints Row IV in August 2013, which served as the conclusion of the original series. A reboot, titled simply Saints Row, was released in August 2022.
