= Saints Row (2022 video game) =

Action-adventure video game

- Developer: Volition
- Publisher: Deep Silver
- Director: Brian Traficante
- Producers: Rojé DePaul Smith; Kate Marlin
- Designer: James Hague
- Programmer: Randy Oberlerchner
- Artist: Frank Marquart
- Writers: Jacques Hennequet; Jason Scott
- Composer: Malcolm Kirby Jr.
- Series: Saints Row
- Platforms: PlayStation 4; PlayStation 5; Stadia; Windows; Xbox One; Xbox Series X/S
- Release: WW: August 23, 2022
- Genre: Action-adventure
- Modes: Single-player, multiplayer

Saints Row is a 2022 action-adventure game developed by Volition and published by Deep Silver. It is a reboot of the Saints Row series, and the fifth main installment, following 2013's Saints Row IV. The game was released for PlayStation 4, PlayStation 5, Google Stadia, Windows, Xbox One, and Xbox Series X/S on August 23, 2022. Set within the fictional city of Santo Ileso, inspired by Las Vegas, the story follows a group of four friends who start their own outlaw gang called the Saints, which they subsequently expand by seizing power from other criminal organizations in the city.

The game is played from a third-person view and its open world is navigated on-foot or by vehicle. Players can fight enemies using a variety of firearms and other weapons, and call in non-playable gang members to assist them. Similarly to previous Saints Row titles, players control the gang's leader, nicknamed "the Boss", who features highly customizable traits. Outside of the main story, players can freely explore Santo Ileso and engage in several different side activities. A cooperative online multiplayer mode is also included, allowing two players to play through the single-player campaign together while progressing in their own game.

The developers of Saints Row intended for the game to return to a mixture of drama and comedy that had been present in earlier games in the series. Upon release, the game received mixed reviews, being criticized for its writing, the large number of technical issues at launch, and certain gameplay elements feeling dated. Due to the game's reception, Volition's parent company Embracer Group announced that Volition would become part of Gearbox Entertainment, then later closed the studio in August 2023, making Saints Row its final game.

== Gameplay ==
In-game screenshot showing the player character traversing the city of Santo Ileso on motorcycle

Similar to previous installments in the series, Saints Row is an open world action game with third-person shooter elements where players complete missions—linear scenarios with set objectives—to progress through the main story. Outside of missions, players can freely roam the game's world and complete optional side activities. The game's setting, the fictional city of Santo Ileso, is broken down into nine districts, which players will have to work towards taking over in the name of their gang, the Saints, earning certain benefits in the process. After taking over a district, players are able to use empty lots found there to launch illegitimate businesses with legitimate fronts to finance and benefit the gang. The city includes more vertical areas, which can be explored using specific tools made available to the player. The driving gameplay has been improved from previous Saints Row games to encourage the use of vehicles as weapons themselves alongside guns.

The game includes a detailed character creator for the player-character, including selection of gender. In addition to their character's appearance, players are also able to customize their weapons and vehicles. There is a drop-in cooperative multiplayer mode which allows two players to play together at the same time, with each player using their own custom Boss character and progressing in their own missions.

== Synopsis ==
=== Setting ===
Saints Row is set in the fictional city of Santo Ileso, located in the American southwest and modeled after Las Vegas, Nevada. At the start of the game, the city is controlled by two warring gangs: Los Panteros, a gritty vehicle and fitness-oriented gang that runs smuggling and protection; and the Idols, an anarcho-communist gang focused on clubs and nightlife. A third faction, Marshall Defense Industries, an international private military corporation known for its high-tech weaponry, is also based in Santo Ileso and attempts to eradicate all gang presence in the city while increasing its own influence.

The player character (Max Mittelman, Erica Lindbeck, Catero Colbert, Bryce Charles, Antony Del Rio, Emily O'Brien, Adam Gold or Rachel Butera), known simply as "the Boss", gets fired from Marshall Defense Industries and decides to form a gang, the Saints, with the help of their friends and roommates: Eli (Eugene Byrd), a successful investor and business entrepreneur that plans most of the gang's operations; Kevin (Greg Chun), an aspiring chef who formerly worked as a DJ for the Idols and handles the execution of the Saints' heists; and Neenah (Jeannie Tirado), an art major and ex-mechanic for Los Panteros who serves as the gang's driver.

=== Plot ===
On their first day of work for Marshall Defense Industries, the Boss apprehends a notorious criminal known as "The Nahualli" (Christian Lenz), but is denied a performance bonus by their strict superior, Gwen Theriault (Toks Olagundoye). Nevertheless, the Boss returns to their rented apartment to celebrate their success with their friends and roommates: Eli, Kevin, and Neenah. Although affiliated with rival groups (Kevin with the Idols and Neenah with Los Panteros), the four remain more loyal to each other, and often engage in criminal activities together to afford their rent and student loans.

The Boss later helps Marshall recover a stolen Mayan artifact known as the Hummingbird Codex from a Panteros smuggling convoy, narrowly evading the gang's leader, Sergio Velez (David DeSantos). Company founder Atticus Marshall (Darin DePaul) praises the Boss and gives them a promotion to head of security at an unveiling gala for the Codex. The Idols and the Panteros both attack the gala to steal the artifact, with the former succeeding. Although the Boss saves the life of Marshall board member Myra Starr (Anna Vocino), Atticus fires them for failing to protect the Codex.

The following evening, Kevin and Eli attend an Idols party at a local resort, which is attacked by Los Panteros. Eli is injured, and one of the Idols' leaders is killed by the group after Kevin refuses an order to kill his friends. With both the Panteros and the Idols now targeting them, the group resolve to start their own criminal organization. They use an abandoned church as their headquarters, and adopt the moniker "The Saints".

The Saints take on the Idols and Los Panteros to gain territory, and to spite Marshall, the Boss helps Eli defeat Gwen in her favorite LARP tournament. To cover the operational costs, the group decide to rob a shipment of Federal Reserve cash on board a Marshall-protected train. The Boss breaks the Nahualli out of Marshall's private prison to assist them with the heist, subsequently forming a bond with him. The Saints fend off the Panteros (with the Nahualli personally killing Sergio) and escape the train with the money. The Boss and Kevin later steal the Hummingbird Codex back from the Idols' base of operations aboard a yacht, killing two more of the gang's leaders in the process. (Note: The remaining Idols leaders can be subsequently encountered and killed in side missions.)

Marshall's legal counsel approaches the Saints and informs them that the group's front companies have been legally declared Marshall subsidiaries, due to the Boss having signed a non-compete agreement upon hiring. The Boss and Eli storm Marshall's headquarters to demand the return of their companies, but only find Myra Starr, as Atticus has already fled the building. Myra reveals her desire to usurp Atticus as the chairperson of the company, explaining that if Atticus were killed, the role would pass to his next of kin. Myra and the Boss collaborate to tank the company's stock price by using a Marshall tank to cause destruction in the city, triggering a vote by the board on whether to replace Atticus with Myra. The vote comes to a tie, which is broken by the Boss using a momentary seat granted by Myra. Atticus is either fired or killed by the Boss, and Myra uses her new position to return the Saints' assets before parting ways with them.

Several months later, the Saints hold a party to celebrate their successes. The Nahualli returns to seemingly accept the Boss' invite to officially join the gang, only to betray and bury the Boss alive, explaining his jealousy of the Boss' life and his desire to replace them. His men attack the party and kidnap Kevin, Neenah and Eli, whom the Nahualli subsequently forces to act as his friends. Surviving the burial, the Boss tracks the Nahualli to a vacant casino, rescuing the other three founding Saints and killing the Nahualli in a gunfight atop a helipad. The four then toast to their friendship while enjoying the sunset on the rooftop and their control over Santo Ileso.

== Development ==
THQ Nordic announced in August 2019 that Volition was developing a full entry in the Saints Row series. Parent organization Koch Media, owner of the Saints Row intellectual property, said they were giving the developer time and space to make the game they saw fit. The series had a rocky history in the years prior to the reboot's development. The previous full game in the series was Saints Row IV (2013), which was followed by a standalone expansion titled Saints Row: Gat out of Hell (2015). A series spin-off, Agents of Mayhem (2017), sold poorly and led to layoffs at Volition. Saints Row was officially announced as a reboot of the franchise at the August 2021 Gamescom, which was met with divided opinion on social media for not retaining the "feel" of prior series entries.

The reboot was intended to pull away from the "wacky" tone of Saints Row IV and later games in the series, instead bringing back the balance between comedy and seriousness that Saints Row 2 had. Volition's Jeremy Bernstein compared Saints Row IV to Moonraker of the James Bond films series, having gone so far outside the realm of reality that they need to reel it back in. Studio development director Jim Boone added that the current social climate had outgrown the tone of prior Saints Row games. Some of the more lewd elements like the giant purple dildo that could be used as a weapon were cut for this reason. The game's developer, Volition, looked to action films as reference points for what they wanted players to experience, including the feel-good vehicular movement of Baby Driver, the brutal, stylized combat of John Wick, and the extravagance of Hobbs & Shaw, "that Saints Row sort of flavor".

Saints Row was originally set to release on February 25, 2022, for PlayStation 4, PlayStation 5, Windows, Xbox One, Xbox Series X/S, and Stadia platforms; however, it was later delayed to August 23, 2022. The PC version was exclusive to the Epic Games Store until August 2023, when it was released on Steam. A post-release expansion pass was announced alongside the game, set to include at least three pieces of downloadable content. A pre-order bonus and digital-only special editions include additional cosmetic content. The first DLC pack, titled The Heist and The Hazardous, was released on May 9, 2023. Alongside the DLC, a free update for the game added a new region called Sunshine Springs to the map.

== Reception ==
=== Critical reception ===
Reception

Aggregate score
Aggregator	Score
Metacritic	PC: 63/100; PS5: 61/100; XSXS: 65/100

Review scores
Publication	Score
Destructoid	8/10
Electronic Gaming Monthly	2/5
Game Informer	8.5/10
GameRevolution	6.5/10
GameSpot	6/10
GamesRadar+	3/5
Hardcore Gamer	3/5
IGN	6/10
PC Gamer (US)	60/100
VG247	3/5
VideoGamer.com	4/10

Saints Row received "mixed or average" reviews from critics, according to review aggregator website Metacritic. Reviews focused on the large number of bugs present at launch, leading the Washington Post to call the game "barely playable." Other major concerns were with the quality of the story and writing, and parts of the gameplay feeling dated. Gamespot wrote that, while the combat and story were adequate, the game "struggl[ed] to live up to its legacy". EGM praised the "great open-world city and respectable gameplay fundamentals," but was disappointed by "a story that never finds its footing, and too many bugs to count."

=== Sales ===
According to Volition's parent company Embracer Group, Saints Row's pre-order sales had exceeded the publisher's expectations. Saints Row was the biggest-selling physical game in the United Kingdom, topping the charts in its debut week of release and selling more than five times the number of units as Volition's 2017 game Agents of Mayhem. For week 2 of the UK sales, Saints Row experienced an 80% drop in sales, falling from No. 1 to No. 6 on the chart. During August, Saints Row was the best-selling digital game, and the second best-selling physical game behind Lego Star Wars: The Skywalker Saga. In Japan, during its first week of release, the PlayStation 4 version was the ninth best-selling retail game, with 10,013 physical units sold; the PlayStation 5 version was the twelfth best-selling retail game, with 7,622 physical units sold.

Embracer Group CEO Lars Wingefors stated that while he expects Saints Row to be profitable, he felt it likely won't "have as great a return on investment as we have seen in many other games". He further expressed his disappointment of the game's "polarising" reception.

By October 2022, Saints Row had reached over 1 million players.

In November 2022, Embracer Group stated that Saints Row "did not meet the full expectations and left the fanbase partially polarized", but financially "performed in line with management expectations in the quarter." It subsequently announced that Volition would be transferred from Deep Silver to Gearbox Entertainment, stating that it "has all the tools, including an experienced management team in the US, to create future success at Volition". In August 2023, Embracer shuttered Volition.
