= Agents of Mayhem =

2017 video game

- Developer: Volition
- Publisher: Deep Silver
- Producer: Greg Donovan
- Designer: Anoop Shekar
- Artist: Matt Flegel
- Writer: Jason L Blair
- Composer: Malcolm Kirby Jr.
- Engine: CTG Engine
- Platforms: PlayStation 4 Windows; Xbox One
- Release: NA: August 15, 2017; AU: August 16, 2017; EU: August 18, 2017
- Genre: Action-adventure
- Mode: Single-player

Agents of Mayhem is a 2017 action-adventure game developed by Volition and published by Deep Silver. It was released for the PlayStation 4, Windows, and Xbox One in August 2017. The game's themes are based on Saturday-morning cartoons and superhero films, and its story takes place in a parallel universe to Volition's Saints Row series, incorporating several plot and character crossovers.

Agents of Mayhem received mixed reviews from critics; it was generally praised for its humor, characters and combat, but criticized for its repetitiveness. The game sold 300,000 units by February 2018 and was a commercial disappointment, which lead to layoffs at Volition.

== Gameplay ==
Agents of Mayhem is an action-adventure game played from a third-person perspective and set in an open world based on Seoul, South Korea. The game features fifteen playable characters, called "agents", and players can choose any three to complete missions and explore the world.

Each agent has their own unique playstyle and abilities. For instance, Hardtack uses a shotgun as his primary weapon, while Hollywood utilizes his assault rifle. As players deal damage to enemies with their weapons, they accumulate points that will fill up a bar. When the bar is filled, players can utilize the agents' Mayhem abilities, which are superpower moves that greatly aid the player in combat. Different agents have different Mayhem abilities; for example, Fortune can use her drone, GLORY, to stun enemies, while Hollywood can trigger massive explosions around him. Players can switch between the three agents they have selected freely, and experiment with different combinations of agents to see which trio of characters suit their playstyle the most. Movement in the game is fast. The agents can triple-jump around the city or use cars to traverse the game's world.

In addition to the main campaign missions, there are also unlock missions, which unlock new agents for players to control, and personal missions, which delve into the backstory of these agents. Different agents will have different personalities, and their responses to in-game events vary. As the player progresses in the game, the agents will gain experience points, cash, skills, new gadgets, and mods that enhance their combat efficiency. There are also cosmetic customization options for the agents and weapons featured in the game.

== Synopsis ==
=== Setting ===
Agents of Mayhem takes place in a futuristic version of Seoul, South Korea, billed as "the city of tomorrow". The game is part of a multiverse alongside Volition's Saints Row and Red Faction series, taking place after the "recreate Earth" ending of the Saints Row IV stand-alone expansion, Gat out of Hell.

The plot revolves around two organizations: M.A.Y.H.E.M. (the Multinational AgencY Hunting Evil Masterminds), funded by the Ultor Corporation (one of the main antagonists of Saints Row 2 and the Red Faction series, later merging with the Saints in Saints Row: The Third) and bearing the Saints' purple fleur-de-lis logo; and L.E.G.I.O.N. (the League of Evil Gentlemen Intent on Obliterating Nations). L.E.G.I.O.N., planning world conquest, reveal themselves to the public with a worldwide attack to topple the world's governments, dubbed "Devil's Night". Persephone Brimstone (first seen in Gat out of Hell), the L.E.G.I.O.N. Minister of Gluttony, defects after learning that L.E.G.I.O.N.'s leader, the Morningstar, plots to harvest the power of Dark Matter to alter reality and ascend into godhood. Escaping with an airship called the ARK, Persephone forms M.A.Y.H.E.M. and recruits agents to stop L.E.G.I.O.N. from destroying the world's nations.

There are twelve main game playable M.A.Y.H.E.M. agents: Braddock, an American field strategist; Daisy, an American roller derby athlete; Fortune, a Colombian former sky pirate; Hardtack, a United States Navy chief petty officer; Hollywood, a Canadian actor and proclaimed "Face of Mayhem"; Joule, an Italian engineer; Kingpin, an American gang leader and alias of Pierce Washington; Oni, a Japanese hitman; Rama, an Indian immunologist; Red Card, a German football hooligan; Scheherazade, a Middle Eastern assassin; and Yeti, a Russian "Cold Warrior" and alias of Oleg Kirrlov. The agents later split into four trios: the Bombshells (Joule, Rama, and Red Card); the Carnage à Trois (Braddock, Daisy, and Yeti); the Firing Squad (Kingpin, Oni, and Scheherazade); and the Franchise Force (Fortune, Hardtack, and Hollywood).

Three additional agents are available via downloadable content: Gat, a South Korean police officer; Lazarus, a Moroccan soldier; and Safeword, an American hacker and alias of Kinzie Kensington.

=== Plot ===
In Seoul, M.A.Y.H.E.M. tracks down Dr. Babylon, the ambitious leader of the Ministry of Pride for L.E.G.I.O.N., who plans on harvesting a giant dark matter crystal from a comet. The Franchise Force is sent to kill Babylon, but fails. To distract M.A.Y.H.E.M., Babylon uses his lieutenant Hammersmith to cause destruction around Seoul before Hammersmith is defeated by the agents. Babylon then uses August Gaunt, a young singer and another one of his lieutenants, to brainwash his fans and attempt to turn the city of Seoul against M.A.Y.H.E.M., but the agents confront him at his concert and shut down his technology, exposing Gaunt as a fraud.

M.A.Y.H.E.M. then plans to retrieve a sentient computer program called AISHA, a virtual female idol group that L.E.G.I.O.N. is using as a virus, but Steeltoe, one of Babylon's cybernetic lieutenants, falls in love with AISHA and starts a relationship with her. Steeltoe and AISHA intend to merge their AI's, but Steeltoe is killed by M.A.Y.H.E.M.'s agents at their "wedding". A vengeful AISHA, led by their red avatar, begins a smear campaign against M.A.Y.H.E.M., eventually creating a musical single to kill its listeners, before initiating an attack on the ARK'S computer programs. Purple AISHA willingly defects to M.A.Y.H.E.M. as their agents destroy the Red AISHA.

Babylon sends in Ariadne, the daughter of a scientist he killed, before trying to brainwash her with a microchip. Ariadne launches robot attacks on Seoul and abducts multiple people, including M.A.Y.H.E.M.'s technological engineer, Katy "Gremlin" Fox. The agents rescue Gremlin, but Ariadne escapes before cutting out her microchip and attempting to brainwash Babylon as revenge.

M.A.Y.H.E.M. seeks to find Babylon's giant robot, Project Damocles, but Babylon launches a city-wide assault and an attack on the ARK before commandeering Damocles and extracting the dark matter crystal. Aware of Ariadne's betrayal, Babylon uses Damocles to go on a rampage and the power of the dark matter crystal to begin rewriting reality where he rules the world. The agents enter the rift to battle Babylon and his recreated minions, and eventually destroy the dark matter crystal. With the crystal destroyed, reality goes back to normal as Damocles crash-lands on Earth. Babylon and the agents survive the crash, but Babylon is taken and presumably killed by L.E.G.I.O.N.'s Minister of Wrath, Marcus Longinus, as punishment for his failure, while Persephone has M.A.Y.H.E.M. pull out of Seoul.

== Development ==
Development of the game began shortly after the release of Saints Row IV in 2013. The game began its development cycle as some concept art and character descriptions, and after receiving positive comments from outsiders who listened to the pitch, one of whom described it as "G.I. Joe versus Cobra Megafight 2020", the game soon entered full production. Unlike previous Saints Row games, which have only one player-controlled protagonist, Agents of Mayhem introduces multiple playable characters. This was done because Volition reflected on some of their previous fan events, where fans opted to cosplay as the supporting characters rather than the central character. They took this as evidence to show that fans of the franchise would be interested in a character-focused game. Another reason was that the developers, inspired by League of Legends and Dota 2, wanted players to form a strong connection with the characters. Volition also thought that the game, being a single-player title, had a great advantage, since most games with a diverse cast of characters are multiplayer-focused. The game's tone and style were inspired by 1980s action cartoons such as G.I. Joe, He-Man, and television series like The A-Team.

In 2014, after receiving $200,000 in incentives from the city of Champaign, Illinois, Volition began hiring upwards of 100 employees to begin work on a new project. Little was known about the game until a trademark for Agents of Mayhem filed by Koch Media (Deep Silver's parent company) was discovered in May 2016, along with résumés linking the project to Volition. Further speculation arose from a 2013 Polygon interview with Volition's Scott Phillips, referring to Saints Row players as "agent[s] of mayhem". The game was formally announced on June 6, 2016, with a cinematic announcement trailer released via IGN. Agents of Mayhem was released in North America on August 15, 2017, and in Europe on August 18, 2017.

== Reception ==
Reception

Aggregate score
| Aggregator | Score |
|---|---|
| Metacritic | (PC) 68/100 (PS4) 62/100 (XONE) 73/100 |

Review scores
| Publication | Score |
|---|---|
| Destructoid | 7/10 |
| Electronic Gaming Monthly | 7/10 |
| Game Informer | 8/10 |
| GameRevolution | 3.5/5 |
| GameSpot | 4/10 |
| GamesRadar+ | 4/5 |
| Giant Bomb | 2/5 |
| IGN | 7.1/10 |
| PC Gamer (US) | 67/100 |
| Polygon | 5.5/10 |
| VideoGamer.com | 5/10 |

Agents of Mayhem received "mixed or average" reviews from critics, according to review aggregator website Metacritic.

Nick Valdez's 7/10 score on Destructoid stated that the game was "Solid and definitely has an audience. There could be some hard-to-ignore faults, but the experience is fun." 5/10 was Alice Bell's score on VideoGamer.com, who wrote "Despite fun combat and characters, Agents of Mayhem becomes repetitive and grinding. In trying to chase the popularity of Saints Row, it misses having an identity of its own." Michael Goroff's score of 7/10 on Electronic Gaming Monthly said that "Agents of Mayhem is one of those games with so much potential that just doesn't quite reach the heights it probably could. That being said, it's exhilarating combat and unique character system have me looking forward to a more polished, more fully conceived sequel."

Connor Sheridan said on GamesRadar "Hero-swapping tactics add a unique edge to third-person combat, while humor and heart elevate Agents of Mayhem's typical world-saving fundamentals to memorable heights," and awarded the game a score of 4 out of 5 stars. Dan Ryckert from Giant Bomb gave the game a score of 2 out of 5 stars, saying that "It may share a genre and universe with Saints Row, but Agents of Mayhem is a lifeless husk of Volition's prior work." "With fun combat and a likable cast, Agents of Mayhem leans too heavily on repetitive fights to be truly heroic," was Jon Ryan's conclusion on IGN with a score of 7.1/10.

PC Gamer's Jon Morcom scored the game a 67/100 with the consensus that it "serves up a generous range of play styles, but it's hampered by repetitive levels and a few uninspired design choices." Justin McElroy of Polygon awarded it 5.5/10, stating that "This has likely started to feel like a litany of sins rather than cogent critique, but it's the best way I have of illustrating Agent of Mayhem's failings. It is not felled by any one thing, but is rather undone by a thousand little cuts. Agents of Mayhem heaps theoretical fun on you. Characters, powers, upgrades, tons of missions — it's desperate for the player to just have fun. It's a noble impulse, but one that it's depressingly incapable of consistently delivering on.

Brett Todd, in a review for GameSpot, concluded "there's little to Agents of Mayhem beyond its foul-mouthed and bombastic attitude, which push the game into grating and obnoxious territory. Throw in the poor mission design and bugs, and you've got a game with loads of mayhem, but not much else."

=== Sales ===
Agents of Mayhem was the 16th best-selling game in the United States for August 2017, according to the NPD Group. It was the fourth best-selling in the United Kingdom during the week of its release. The disappointing sales numbers of the game led to cost reductions at Volition in September 2017, reportedly resulting in layoffs of over 30 people at the studio, which previously had around 200 employees.

By October 2017, the game had grossed €19 million. By February 2018, it had sold 300,000 units.

=== Accolades ===
The game was nominated for "Performance in a Comedy, Supporting" with Eliza Schneider as Agent Rama, and for "Writing in a Comedy" at the National Academy of Video Game Trade Reviewers Awards.

== Related media ==
A board game titled Agents of Mayhem: Pride of Babylon, developed by Academy Games, was successfully crowdfunded via Kickstarter in February 2018.
