= Super Best Friends Play =

Canadian YouTube channel

YouTube information
- Channel: Super Best Friends Play
- Years active: 2011–2018
- Genres: Let's Play; comedy
- Subscribers: 700 thousand
- Views: 751 million
- Last updated: July 9, 2026

Super Best Friends Play, initially known as Two Best Friends Play, was a Canadian YouTube channel and ensemble known for their Let's Play videos. Started in 2011, the channel was originally created by Matthew Kowalewski and Patrick Boivin as a series on the now-defunct gaming network Machinima, based around the idea of two friends arguing while playing video games. Hosted on the separate account TheSw1tcher, the group's content focused on both popular and obscure games, and the series later included members Woolie Madden and Liam Allen-Miller.

On December 16, 2018, the group uploaded their final video announcing their breakup. Their dissolution was attributed to the end of Kowalewski and Boivin's friendship, and each member continued making content individually. Following the disbandment, the series sustained a dedicated cult following with an active fanbase on social media sites. Super Best Friends Play was among the most popular Let's Play channels on YouTube, and was noted for popularizing various obscure games.

== History ==
=== Origins and content ===
Super Best Friends Play was started in 2011 by Montreal, Quebec natives Matthew "Matt" Kowalewski and Patrick "Pat" Boivin. Kowalewski had worked as a quality assurance tester for various game studios such as Eidos-Montréal, while Boivin was a grocery store bagger following his graduation from university as a psychology major. The duo had met as mutual friends of future member Woolie Madden, and following an upload of a Street Fighter cartoon compilation, Kowalewski recruited Boivin to collaborate with him on a comedic video of Kirby's Epic Yarn. According to Kowalewski, the idea for the Kirby's Epic Yarn video was to have two people arguing and getting angry over the game, which was noted for its easy difficulty. First naming themselves "Two Best Friends Play" ironically in reference to their dynamic, the duo proceeded to make more Let's Play-based videos on YouTube which soon received attention. After several months, a representative from the gaming network Machinima contacted Kowalewski to offer them a partnership to produce videos for their network. Initially working as contributors to the network, they soon garnered popularity and revenue from their videos, which allowed them to leave their jobs to become full-time YouTubers. Becoming Super Best Friends Play, the channel eventually included Madden and Liam Allen-Miller, the latter of whom would leave in 2016 to focus on his streaming career.

Super Best Friends Play primarily uploaded long-form Let's Play videos on their main channel "TheSw1tcher". The duo's dynamic revolved around Kowalewski playing the innocent straight man to Boivin's angrier nerdy persona. Madden was known for his friendly nature and his enjoyment of competitive fighting games, while Allen-Miller was considered the quiet one in the group. Contrasting from other gaming channels, Super Best Friends Play created Let's Play videos on a wide variety of games, including both titles from the popular Resident Evil and Silent Hill series, and more obscure Japanese-based games such as the then niche series Persona and Yakuza. Their content was noted for emphasizing the members' individual gaming tastes rather than focusing on trending game releases. The group played both console and PC games, and often played various horror-themed games throughout October in anticipation for Halloween. Other games the group played included Kingdom Hearts, Metal Wolf Chaos and the unofficially released fighting game Death Cargo. Their content also contained several memes and running gags, such as mocking Quantic Dream games. Their fanbase was referred to as the "Best Friends Zaibatsu," which jokingly referenced Japanese conglomerates. They also produced a podcast called the Super Best Friendcast. An unused character design from Street Fighter II, nicknamed "Zubaz" or "The Baz" after his style of clothing, became an unofficial mascot of the channel after being spotlighted in their Fighterpedia video series. He would make appearances in several games backed by Kowalewski and Madden though crowdfunding, including Divekick, Shovel Knight, and Indivisible.

=== Breakup and responses ===
External video
- Super Best Friends (FINAL); The final video uploaded on TheSw1tcher on December 16, 2018

On Sunday, December 16, 2018, a video titled "Super Best Friends (FINAL)" was uploaded to their channel. In the video, Madden, Kowalewski and Boivin appeared in separate segments to explain their decision to disband the group. Madden stated that "Matt and Pat are no longer friends", and attributed business aspects to the deterioration of Kowalewski and Boivin's friendship. Each member specified that they would focus on their individual content following their disbandment. Madden would continue making traditional Let's Play videos on his channel "Woolie Versus," alongside creating video essays and a podcast called "Woolie Will Figure it Out." Kowalewski would also create video game and film reviews on his channel "Matt McMuscles", along with working on the beat 'em up fighting game The TakeOver, which was released in 2019. Boivin would focus on live streaming games on Twitch. Their channel would remain inactive as an archive for their past videos. The final Let's Play series they had uploaded was Kingdom Hearts. Boivin and Madden would later create the Castle Super Beast podcast as a successor to the Super Best Friendcast.

Considered an unexpected announcement, their dissolution led to numerous reactions across social media. Fans expressed feelings of shock on the official Super Best Friends subreddit, which then had over 50,000 members. On Twitter, "SuperBestFriends" trended with thousands of fans posting their appreciation for the group. Various theories emerged about their breakup amongst the community. Several fans had speculated that the final video was a joke, while other fans pointed out growing tensions between Kowalewski and Boivin in the weeks leading to the announcement. Outlets such as Newsweek and Bleeding Cool claimed that the channel's dissolution reflected an inevitable aspect of content creation as a transition from a hobby to a business. As of 2026, the announcement is their most-viewed video with over 1.8 million views. (Note: TheSw1tcher (December 16, 2018). Super Best Friends (FINAL). Archived from the original on January 29, 2024 – via YouTube.)

== Reception and impact ==
Super Best Friends Play were among the most popular Let's Play channels on YouTube prior to their dissolution. Their channel had reached over 750,000 subscribers and over 600 million views by the time of their breakup. They were also credited with popularizing several games through their videos. Following their Yakuza 4 playthrough, sales of the game significantly increased on Amazon by 700 percent according to Boivin, and Gene Park of The Washington Post attributed the popularity of the Yakuza series to their videos. Their series on Metal Wolf Chaos was also recognized for bringing popularity to the game in the West. Various Let's Play videos of theirs were referenced on gaming sites like Kotaku and PCGamesN, and appeared highly on search results for certain games. Mic listed the channel as one of the best Let's Play YouTubers.

Despite the channel's inactivity, their fan community continues to remain active. A 2021 Inverse article noted their fanbase's sustained activity in the aftermath of their breakup. The Super Best Friends subreddit grew to over 80,000 members by 2021, and their Discord server reached over 3,000 members. The COVID-19 pandemic and the open nature of the community were considered factors for its activity, as members continually shared memes of the group. Writer Steven T. Wright commented: "In our increasingly online world — an existing trend super-accelerated by the ongoing pandemic — communities of a certain size eventually take on a mind of their own, even when separated from the original impetus for their creation."

== See also ==
- List of YouTubers
