= Insane (cancelled video game) =

- Developer: Volition
- Publisher: THQ
- Director: Guillermo del Toro
- Engine: Unreal Engine 3
- Platforms: Microsoft Windows; PlayStation 3 Xbox 360
- Release: Cancelled
- Genre: Survival horror
- Mode: Single-player

Insane (stylized as inSANE) was a survival horror video game, formerly in development by Volition to be published by THQ, in collaboration with film director Guillermo del Toro. It was being developed for Microsoft Windows, PlayStation 3 and Xbox 360, and was to be released in 2013. It was intended as the first installment of a planned trilogy of Insane video games.

== Development ==
Insane was first announced by Guillermo del Toro and Volition at the 2010 Spike Video Game Awards on 11 December 2010 in the form of a thirty-second teaser trailer. Del Toro said of the game, "With this new series of video games, I want to take players to a place they have never seen before, where every single action makes them question their own senses of morality and reality. THQ and Volition are equally excited to make this vision of a completely new game universe into a reality." In a 2026 interview, del Toro said they wanted to create a Mandela effect of a seemingly infinite sandbox for the players, giving them enough agency in their choices to make it appear without bounds, but still constrain the players to expected behavior.

THQ announced the cancellation of Insane on 6 August 2012, with the intellectual property rights transferring to del Toro. Reasons for the cancellation was never officially disclosed, however THQ would file for bankruptcy just five months later.
