= Saints Row =

Action-adventure video game series

- Logo used since 2022
- Genre: Action-adventure
- Developers: Volition (2006–2022) Other: High Voltage Software (2015); Fishlabs (2019–2020); Sperasoft (2020)
- Publishers: THQ (2006–2013); Deep Silver (2013–2022)
- Platforms: Xbox 360; Xbox One; Xbox Series X/S; PlayStation 3; PlayStation 4; PlayStation 5; Microsoft Windows; Linux; Mobile phone; Nintendo Switch; Stadia; Luna
- First release: Saints Row; August 29, 2006
- Latest release: Saints Row; August 23, 2022

Saints Row is a series of action-adventure video games created by Volition and published by THQ and Deep Silver. The series follows the 3rd Street Saints, a street gang originally operating out of the Saint's Row district in the fictional city of Stilwater, hence the series' title. Due to the first entry being labeled as a Grand Theft Auto clone, the developers sought to create a more distinctive experience from the second game onwards, with a heavy focus on over-the-top gameplay, popular culture homages, parodies, and self-referential humor. This change in direction helped define the series' identity, but proved controversial among fans of the original game.

Gameplay in the Saints Row games focuses on an open world where the player can complete missions to progress an overall story, as well as engage in various side activities. Most of the gameplay revolves around driving and shooting, with occasional role-playing elements. The first four games in the series are set primarily in two fictional locales—Stilwater and Steelport—which are loosely based on real American cities. The games center on an initially unnamed player-created character (later nicknamed "the Boss") who joins the 3rd Street Saints by chance and helps them defeat enemy gangs in citywide turf wars. In the sequels, the player character goes on to become the gang's leader, a celebrity and pop culture icon, and eventually president of the United States, while facing more powerful enemies, such as a corrupt corporation, an anti-gang paramilitary, and an alien empire.

Work on the original Saints Row began in 2003, after Volition's completion of Red Faction II. The game was released in August 2006. The sequel, Saints Row 2, was released in October 2008. The series' third entry, Saints Row: The Third, was released in November 2011 and was the final Saints Row video game to be published by THQ before Deep Silver acquired the rights to series in 2013. The fourth game, Saints Row IV, was released in August 2013, with a standalone expansion called Gat out of Hell releasing in January 2015. As of September 2013, the series has had sales in excess of 13 million, making it one of the best-selling video game franchises of all time.

A reboot of the series, titled Saints Row, was announced in August 2021 and released in August 2022. The reboot takes place in the fictional city of Santo Ileso in the American southwest and follows a new gang, simply called The Saints, as they attempt to take control of the city from the different factions ruling it. The game did not fare well critically and failed to meet the expectations of fans of the original series. As part of a reorganization within Volition's parent company, Embracer Group, Volition was shut down in August 2023, with the Saints Row and other Volition IP being transferred to Plaion, also under Embracer Group.

== Games ==
Title	Year of original release	Platform(s)				Developer(s)	Publisher(s)	Notes
Title	Year of original release	PC	7th gen consoles	8th gen consoles	9th gen consoles	Developer(s)	Publisher(s)	Notes
Saints Row	2006	—N/a	Xbox 360	Xbox One (Note: Available through backwards compatibility from prior generation's release)	Xbox Series X/S	Volition	THQ	First game in the series
Saints Row 2	2008	Windows, Linux	Xbox 360, PlayStation 3	Xbox One	Xbox Series X/S	Volition	THQ	Windows port developed by CD Projekt
Saints Row: The Third	2011	Windows, Linux	Xbox 360, PlayStation 3	Xbox One, PlayStation 4, Switch	Xbox Series X/S, PlayStation 5	Volition	THQ	Nintendo Switch port developed by Fishlabs. PS4 and Xbox One remastered version developed by Sperasoft.
Saints Row IV	2013	Windows, Linux	Xbox 360, PlayStation 3	Xbox One, PlayStation 4, Switch	Xbox Series X/S, PlayStation 5	Volition	Deep Silver	Re-Elected port and Enter the Dominatrix DLC developed with High Voltage Software
Saints Row: Gat out of Hell	2015	Windows, Linux	Xbox 360, PlayStation 3	Xbox One, PlayStation 4	Xbox Series X/S, PlayStation 5	High Voltage; Volition	Deep Silver	Standalone expansion for Saints Row IV
Saints Row	2022	Windows	—N/a	Xbox One, PlayStation 4	Xbox Series X/S, PlayStation 5	Volition	Deep Silver	Reboot of the franchise

=== Saints Row (2006) ===
Saints Row is the first installment in the series, having begun development in mid-2003 as a PlayStation 2 title under the name Bling Bling. The game was announced at E3 2005 for the Xbox 360. It was supposed to also have a port to the Nintendo Wii. As the first game with a non-linear structure to be released for the Xbox 360, Saints Row was widely anticipated; its pre-beta demo build set records after being downloaded nearly 400,000 times within a week. It had sales in excess of 500,000 during its September 2006 release month, and was critically acclaimed. As of 2019, the game has had sales in excess of two million units. The game was renowned for being the first seventh-generation sandbox game, and introduced features which have since become staples of the genre. It features online multiplayer, an in-game mobile phone, GPS navigation, elaborate character and vehicle customization, and a weapon wheel.

Saints Row is set in the fictional city of Stilwater. Players create their own character, who remains silent for most of the game and is referred to as "Playa". After being caught in a shootout between three warring gangs—the Vice Kings, Los Carnales, and the Westside Rollerz—the player character is rescued by a fourth, smaller gang called the 3rd Street Saints, and subsequently joins the Saints to help them take back the Saint's Row district from their rivals. From there, the player's goal is to take over the entire city in the name of the Saints by weakening the gangs that control each district. The player does so by completing both main and side missions related to each enemy faction, which can be carried out solo or with the help of fellow gang members.

=== Saints Row 2 (2008) ===
Saints Row 2 began development in mid-2006, a few months before the Xbox 360 release of Saints Row. While a PlayStation 3 port of Saints Row was in development, it was cancelled when Saints Row 2 was confirmed in May 2007. A Microsoft Windows port, announced in June 2008, was released in early 2009. The game builds upon the fundamentals of Saints Row by improving the respect system, adding more varied activities, increasing the extent to which the player can customize their character, gang, and vehicles, and adding a number of new vehicle models. It also expands the Stilwater setting with new and remodelled locations, and adds new gameplay features and content.

The game's story is set roughly five years after the events of Saints Row and follows the same player character (now identified as "the Boss"), who awakens from a coma to discover that the 3rd Street Saints have fallen from grace in their absence, allowing three new gangs—the Ronin, the Brotherhood, and the Sons of Samedi—to take over the Saints' former territories. Furthermore, the Saint's Row district has been gentrified by the Ultor Corporation, who have further plans for Stilwater. After recruiting new and old allies to their cause and setting up a new base of operations, the Boss works to restore the Saints to power, this time as the gang's leader. The story is structured similarly to the first game, with players undertaking missions related to each gang they must defeat, as well as Ultor later in the storyline. These missions are mostly independent from each other, and require the player to gain respect by completing side activities first.

==== Downloadable content ====
Saints Row 2 received several downloadable content (DLC) releases, including two story packs. The first, Ultor Exposed, adds Red Faction: Guerrilla-themed content, and stars American pornographic actress Tera Patrick, who plays herself as a whistleblower and former microbiologist for the Ultor Corporation. It was released on 23 April 2009. The second, Corporate Warfare, focuses on the struggle between the Saints and the Ultor Corporation, and was released on 28 May 2009.

=== Saints Row: The Third (2011) ===
Saints Row: The Third was announced in March 2011 and released for the Xbox 360, PlayStation 3, and Microsoft Windows in November 2011. It began early development at Volition in September 2008, a month before Saints Row 2 was due to release. The game marks a major turning point for the series, putting more emphasis on comedy and featuring numerous popular culture homages, parodies, and self-referential humor, as well as an over-the-top nature. Reception towards these changes was mixed, though the game nonetheless performed well both critically and financially.

The game features a new setting: Stilwater's sister city, Steelport, which is controlled by a single criminal organization known as the Syndicate, consisting of three gangs—the Morningstar, the Luchadores, and the Deckers. The 3rd Street Saints, now celebrities with a large cult following after selling their license to Ultor to produce merchandise based on the gang, find themselves stranded in Steelport after an altercation with the Syndicate, and must find new allies to help them take over the city and eliminate their rivals. Halfway through the game, Steelport is placed under martial law in response to the increasing gang violence, and a paramilitary known as S.T.A.G. is called to restore order to the city, complicating matters further for the Saints. The mission structure has been changed from the first two games, requiring missions to be played in a specific order. The game also incorporates choices into its narrative, and features multiple possible endings.

==== Downloadable content ====
Downloadable content for Saints Row: The Third was announced before the game's release, along with a commitment from publisher THQ to support 40 weeks of content. Among smaller upgrades, three main content packs were released: Genkibowl VII (released on 17 January 2012), which adds new challenges as part of the titular contest; Gangstas in Space (released on 21 February 2012), focusing on an alien film the Saints are producing; and The Trouble with Clones (released on 20 March 2012), which focuses on the Saints reuniting with a hulking clone of their deceased friend, Johnny Gat.

==== Remaster ====
A remastered version of Saints Row: The Third, including all the DLC for the original game, was released for Windows, PlayStation 4, and Xbox One on May 22, 2020. It was developed by Sperasoft and features remastered assets and textures, along with improved graphics and lighting.

=== Saints Row IV (2013) ===
Saints Row IV was unveiled in March 2013 and released five months later for Microsoft Windows, PlayStation 3, and Xbox 360. It was later ported to PlayStation 4, Xbox One, and Linux in 2015. A Nintendo Switch port was also released on March 27, 2020. The game expands on Saint Row: The Third's humor and over-the-top nature, introducing superpowers. Saints Row IV received several limited and summative edition releases, and was briefly banned in Australia. It generated mostly positive reviews and sold over one million copies in its first week.

The game is set five years after the events of Saints Row: The Third, and begins with the Boss being elected President of the United States after foiling a terrorist attack. When an alien empire known as the Zin attacks the Earth, the Boss and the other Saints are abducted and placed in a simulation of Steelport meant to break their wills. The Boss is able to manipulate the simulation to their own benefit, gaining superpowers, and must find a way to escape, rescue their friends, and defeat the Zin, while facing enemies from their past and their own worst fears.

==== Downloadable content ====
Saints Row IV's first story-driven downloadable content pack, Enter the Dominatrix, is a "director's cut" version of the cancelled Saints Row: The Third expansion of the same name, and was released on 22 October 2013. The story continues from the non-canonical ending of Saints Row: The Third, and depicts an alternate version of the Zin invasion. The second story DLC, How the Saints Save Christmas, was released on 10 December 2013. Its story revolves around the Saints' efforts to rescue Santa Claus from the Steelport simulation, with the Boss, who dislikes the holiday season, learning the true meaning of Christmas along the way.

A standalone expansion to Saints Row IV, Gat out of Hell, was released on 20 January 2015 in North America, and on 23 January in Europe. It focuses on Saints members Johnny Gat and Kinzie Kensington and their efforts to rescue the Boss from Hell after they are kidnapped by Satan.

=== Saints Row (2022) ===
Embracer Group's financial report released in August 2019 stated that a new Saints Row title was in development at Volition studios. In August 2021, the new game was confirmed to be a reboot of the franchise. The reboot, titled Saints Row, was released for the PlayStation 4, PlayStation 5, Xbox One, Xbox Series X/S, Windows, and Stadia on 23 August 2022. The game was intended to be a return to the franchise's roots, with a focus on gang warfare and a less "wacky" tone than Saints Row IV, while adding new features such as an extended character creator with no gender restrictions. However, upon release, the game's writing received criticism, particularly for its different sense of humor compared to previous entries, which was perceived as an attempt by the developers to make the game more appropriate for consumers.

== Gameplay ==
The Saints Row games are set in an open world where players can complete various side activities or engage with the main narrative campaign. Unlike other series such as Grand Theft Auto, the Saints Row games do not feature a sequential storyline, with the campaign being split into multiple story arcs. The series combines elements of action, adventure, and vehicular gameplay. The player can freely roam the virtual world on foot or by vehicle and make use of an array of weapons and melee-based combat. Illegal activities such as assaulting non-player civilians or police officers will instigate a proactive and potentially lethal response from authoritative figures. In the instance of death or arrest, the player will respawn at a nearby hospital or police station.

The Saints Row series has an emphasis on urban warfare. The player character is affiliated with a street gang known as the 3rd Street Saints and fights enemy gangs for control over their territory. Story missions are structurally divided into separate arcs, which can be played either separately or in parallel, without intertwining at any point. Missions are unlocked by accruing respect points from successfully completing non-story minigames known as activities or diversions. Customization constitutes a large portion of the games. The player has the ability to customize their character's appearance, such as their body size and shape; these changes are purely cosmetic and do not affect gameplay in any way. Players can also customize their clothing, vehicles, and the appearance of their fellow gang members, who can be called to assist during fights. Some games, such as Saints Row 2, also allow players to decorate the interior of the Saints' safehouses and refine their gang members' behaviour. Player creations can be shared online, allowing other players to import them into their own game.

== Setting ==
=== Stilwater ===
The setting of both Saints Row and Saints Row 2 is the fictional city of Stilwater, located in the midwestern state of Michigan and primarily based on the real-life American city of Detroit. It also draws inspiration from other American cities, such as the Red Light district being based on New York's Harlem neighborhood. During the early development process of Saints Row, Stilwater was designed before the script was completed; as a result, the city suffered numerous changes during production. The original version, which was four times larger than the city seen in the final game, was abandoned because of the limited development resources. Throughout its development phase, Stilwater underwent constant expansion and cropping, resulting in the removal of many planned areas; some of these, such as the shopping mall and the trailer park, would later be included in Saints Row 2. One design challenge was creating a city without load-screen interference, so the engine was designed to stream around the player's location in individual chunks of the city. Stilwater was designed to feel diverse and have a variance of districts; Saints Row product art director Matt Flegel commented that "We wanted the city to cover all styles, from the towering sky scrapers of downtown to the gritty industrial feel of the factory district. We want the player to feel the changes between the districts, rather than just noticing the visual difference." The districts were designed to feel relevant to the gangs that controlled them.

The Stilwater of Saints Row 2 is significantly different from its original rendition, being roughly 45% larger. Much of the city from Saints Row was redeveloped in Saints Row 2, becoming more "alive" and full of depth. Saints Row 2 lead producer Greg Donovan said that "Stilwater in Saints Row 2 is very different from Saints Row. In fact, every detail has been touched to some degree or another. [...] I think that what will end up happening is that people who played Saints Row or are fans of the franchise are going to have a great time exploring the city and looking for new things. [Also], people that are new to Saints Row 2 are just going to be presented with a huge, very dispersive and very different looking environment, it's very well polished and detailed." There are no in-game load screens in Saints Row 2, a notable feat as the game allows for seamless co-operative play. There are over 130 interiors within the city, including over 90 different shops. The city is more dynamic and lifelike in Saints Row 2, as the artificial intelligence is smarter, i.e., civilians will interact with each other. Additionally, certain elements of Saints Row 2's environment are destructible as the game shares some technology with Red Faction: Guerrilla. Its environment also features numerous landmarks and Easter eggs; one such feature won "Top Easter Egg of 2008".

=== Steelport ===
Steelport is the sister city of Stilwater and the primary setting of Saints Row: The Third and Saints Row IV. It is loosely based on Pittsburgh and, to a lesser extent, New York City. After being driven out of Stilwater by the Syndicate at the start of Saints Row: The Third, the Saints find themselves stranded in Steelport, which becomes the site of a turf war between the two factions, as the Saints attempt to seize control of the city from the Syndicate. Unlike Stilwater, Steelport features a less dynamic atmosphere, with most of its districts looking nearly identical. The buildings have an industrial, run-down look, and there are only a few standout areas, such as the skyscraper-filled central island. It is not uncommon for a mix of different buildings to be placed next to one another, which is explained in-game by the city having no zoning laws. The city's standout landmark is a large statue of American folk hero Joe Magarac, inspired by the real-life Statue of Liberty. As the player progresses through the story, Steelport undergoes several visual changes, such as towers billowing smoke or being upgraded to be taller.

In Saints Row IV, Steelport is recreated as a Matrix-like simulation by the game's alien villain, Zinyak. To fit his likeness, Zinyak has removed almost all signs of the Saints from the city (for example, the Saints' own chain of clothing stores, Planet Saints, has been replaced with Planet Zin) and added images of himself and alien technology. Throughout the game, the player disrupts and eventually destroys the simulation in order to find and kill Zinyak. The simulated nature of this version of Steelport allows for new gameplay mechanics like superpowers, as well as references to previous Saints Row games. At various points in the story, past characters and gang members appear throughout the city; an entertaining example of this is when the player has to kill the default character from the original Saints Row. Outside of Steelport, the player explores several other simulations during the game, which were created by Zinyak to break the Saints' will; some of these include a suburban town inspired by 1950s sitcoms, and a recreation of the Saint's Row district. The only time the game takes place in the real world is at the start and the end of the story, and when the player is on "The Ship", a stolen alien spaceship that acts as the Saints' base of operations during the game.

=== New Hades ===
Saints Row: Gat out of Hell takes place in New Hades, the capital city of Hell. It is much smaller in size than both Stilwater and Steelport and, as a result of its harsh location, is very basic in its design. The city is optimized for the game's new flying mechanic and its activity-based story. Instead of water, the city's islands are surrounded by lava, and in the centre there is a massive tower with a large hole above it, presumably acting as the entry point to Hell.

=== Santo Ileso ===
Saints Row (2022) takes place in Santo Ileso, a fictional city in the American southwest loosely based on Las Vegas. The city is surrounded by a vast desert and valley, which are also explorable.

== Other media ==
=== Film ===
In 2009, rapper 50 Cent announced that he was working on writing a screenplay and optioning the rights for a Saints Row film.

A Saints Row film was announced to be in pre-production in April 2019, with production by Fenix Studios, Koch Media and Occupant Entertainment. F. Gary Gray is set to direct the film with a screenplay written by Greg Russo. Russo has stated that the film will be influenced by both The Warriors and Escape from New York.

== Cancelled games ==
A spin-off titled Saints Row: Undercover was being developed by Savage Entertainment for the PlayStation Portable in 2009 before it was cancelled. On 22 January 2016, Volition found a prototype of the game in a PSP development kit and released it as a free download on Unseen64.net. There is also a design document showing images of diagrams that used real-life pictures to create simple UI mock ups.

Saints Row: Money Shot was to be a spin-off of the main series, originally developed for Xbox Live Arcade. The game would have been released for the Xbox 360 as an Xbox Live Arcade title and for the PlayStation 3 as a PlayStation Network game featuring 3D graphics. It would have been tied to Saints Row: The Third, with players being able to unlock exclusive content in one game by playing the other.

Other cancelled games include a Nintendo 3DS title announced at E3 2010 called Saints Row: Drive By, and a Kinect/PlayStation Move fighting game for Xbox 360 and PlayStation 3 called Saints Row: The Cooler.

== Saints Row shared universe ==
The events of Saints Row take place in a shared universe with Agents of Mayhem.

=== Agents of Mayhem ===
Agents of Mayhem, a new intellectual property set in the Saints Row universe, was announced in June 2016. The game is set in a futuristic rendition of Seoul, South Korea, and takes place after the events of Gat out of Hell's "Recreate Earth" ending, wherein the Saints Row continuity was retconned. The cinematic announcement trailer showed Persephone Brimstone (a character featured in the closing epilogue of Gat out of Hell) leading an organization called M.A.Y.H.E.M. under the Ultor Corporation's payroll to stop the terrorist group L.E.G.I.O.N. from destroying the world's nations. Agents of Mayhem was released on 15 August 2017. Pierce Washington and Oleg Kirlov are two of the game's twelve playable characters, while Johnny Gat and Kinzie Kensington were added via downloadable content.

== Reception ==
=== Critical reception ===
Aggregate review scores As of 28 August 2022.
Game	Metacritic
Saints Row	(X360) 81
Saints Row 2	(PC) 72 (X360) 81 (PS3) 82
Saints Row: The Third	(PC) 84 (X360) 84 (PS3) 82
Saints Row IV	(PC) 86 (X360) 81 (PS3) 76
Saints Row	(PC) 68 (XSX) 67 (PS5) 63

Both Saints Row and Saints Row 2 received positive reviews for their Xbox 360 and PlayStation 3 versions. However, the mobile phone versions of both games, as well as the Windows port of Saints Row 2, received a more mixed response. Additionally, the downloadable content packs for Saints Row 2 received mostly average reviews.

Saints Row received generally positive reviews and scores. It received an 82.20% and 81/100 from review aggregators GameRankings and Metacritic, respectively. IGN reviewer Douglass Perry awarded the game an 8.5/10, praising the presentation and gameplay while pointing out technical shortcomings as well as the often-forced humour. GameSpot reviewer Greg Kasavin awarded the game an 8.3/10, giving credit to the driving, the action, the presentation and the story. However, he criticized the lack of polish and lack of variety in mission design. It was hailed as "the best reason to own a 360 this side of [The Elder Scrolls IV: Oblivion]" and a "must buy" by GamePro reviewer Vicious Sid, who awarded it five stars out of five.

Both the PlayStation 3 and Xbox 360 versions of Saints Row 2 received positive reviews. It received an 83.37% and 82.99% from GameRankings respectively, and 82/100 and 81/100 from Metacritic respectively. GameSpy reviewer Gerald Villoria awarded the game four and a half stars out of five and said that "Saints Row 2 offers up a shooting and driving experience that is plenty of fun [...] It's self-consciously funny in its irreverence, and its low-brow humor will definitely appeal to much of its audience". IGN reviewer Nate Ahearn awarded Saints Row 2 an 8.2/10, praising the gameplay but criticizing the lack of polish and the weak artificial intelligence. The PC port of Saints Row 2 was met with a much less positive response. receiving an aggregated score of 70.68% and 72/100 from GameRankings and Metacritic, respectively.

Dan Whitehead of Eurogamer wrote that Grand Theft Auto IV was a boon for the Saints Row series since it allowed the latter to be "gleeful silly sandbox games" as the former series took a more serious turn.

=== Sales ===
Saints Row 2 shipped over two million units for the Xbox 360 and PlayStation 3 during October 2008, the month of its release.

On 2 November 2011, THQ CEO Brian Farrell announced that Saints Row: The Third was already the most pre-ordered title in series history. The game had four times the number of pre-orders Saints Row 2 had two weeks before its launch. THQ estimated the game would ship over 3 million units before the publisher's fiscal year ended in March 2012. By comparison, Saints Row 2 launched in October 2008 and sold 2.6 million by the end of the fiscal year. On 25 January 2012, THQ announced that Saints Row: The Third had shipped 3.8 million units globally and was expected to ship between five and six million units.

To date, the series has sold over 13 million units, including over three million for Saints Row 2 alone.

== Other appearances ==
Johnny Gat appears as a guest character in the parody fighting game Divekick. Pierce Washington is a featured character in the PlayStation VR game 100ft Robot Golf.
