= Saints Row: Gat out of Hell =

2015 action-adventure game

- Developers: High Voltage Software; Volition
- Publisher: Deep Silver
- Producers: Kevin Sheller; Keith Hladik; Jim Boone
- Designer: Micah Skaritka
- Programmers: Dan Kaufman; Justin Gantenberg
- Artists: Cary Penczek; Joe Hamell
- Writer: Steve Jaros
- Composer: Malcolm Kirby Jr.
- Series: Saints Row
- Platforms: PlayStation 3 PlayStation 4 Windows; Xbox 360; Xbox One; Linux
- Release: NA: January 20, 2015; EU: January 23, 2015; Linux: WW: December 21, 2015
- Genre: Action-adventure
- Modes: Single-player, multiplayer

Saints Row: Gat out of Hell is a 2015 action-adventure game developed by Volition and High Voltage Software, published by Deep Silver, and distributed by Square Enix in North America. It was released for the PlayStation 3, PlayStation 4, Windows, Xbox 360, Xbox One, and Linux. The PlayStation 3 and Xbox 360 versions were released both physically and digitally, while the PlayStation 4 and Xbox One versions were additionally included in a bundled edition with Saints Row IV: Re-Elected.

The game is a standalone expansion to 2013's Saints Row IV. It serves as an epilogue to Saints Row IV's narrative, and follows Third Street Saints members Johnny Gat and Kinzie Kensington as they try to rescue "the Boss" from Hell after being kidnapped by Satan. Gat out of Hell was met with mixed reviews from critics, who praised its unique premise, setting, and entertaining gameplay, but criticized its short length, dated graphics, repetitive side content, and technical issues.

== Gameplay ==
Gat out of Hell is the first Saints Row game in which players do not control their custom character from the previous games, known as "the Boss"; instead, the playable characters are Johnny Gat and Kinzie Kensington, with the Boss playing a minor role. The game shares many gameplay aspects with the previous installments, being primarily played as a third-person shooter in an open-world city scattered with quests, secondary objectives, and various collectibles. Superhuman abilities return from Saints Row IV. Gat out of Hell introduces "angelic flight", giving wings to the player. Unlike past Saints Row games, players cannot customize the playable characters; however, by importing a Saints Row IV save, players can import their custom Boss character to replace the default Boss.

Unlike game progression in previous titles, players advance through the story by completing activities to fill a "Satan's Wrath" meter, which unlocks cutscenes and further story elements. Gat out of Hell takes place in an open world new to the series, New Hades, made up of five islands: Shantytown, Barrens, Downtown, Forge, and the Den, all surrounding a central tower on a middle island.

The player can fly around the open-world Hell. They can also summon demon allies to flight alongside them. The game's weapons are inspired by the seven deadly sins (e.g. the Gluttony Gun that shoots cake batter on enemies for other people to consume).

== Plot ==
The Third Street Saints hold a birthday party for lieutenant Kinzie Kensington (Natalie Lander) on their spaceship. While playing a game of Ouija with a board that once belonged to Aleister Crowley, they unwittingly contact Satan (Travis Willingham), who proclaims that the Boss (Nolan North, Kenn Michael, Robin Atkin Downes, Laura Bailey, Diane Michelle, or Sumalee Montano) will marry his daughter Jezebel (Kate Reinders). Satan then drags the Boss down to Hell; Johnny Gat (Daniel Dae Kim) and Kinzie volunteer to rescue them.

Arriving in Hell's capital city of New Hades, Johnny and Kinzie find a branch of the Ultor Corporation and confront its CEO and former Saints enemy, Dane Vogel (Jay Mohr). Vogel denies involvement in the Boss' kidnapping, but admits he is taking advantage of Hell's economy and offers to help the Saints save the Boss. On Vogel's advice, Johnny and Kinzie attempt to get Satan's attention by recruiting several allies across Hell, including Viola (Sasha Grey) and Kiki DeWynter (Ashly Burch), Blackbeard (Matthew Mercer), William Shakespeare and Vlad the Impaler (both Liam O'Brien). Jezebel, who has begun rebelling against her father, eventually finds Johnny and takes him to confront Satan. Johnny surrenders after Satan threatens to kill Jezebel, prompting Satan to name him worthy of marrying his daughter. Johnny agrees to do so after Satan promises to free Kinzie and the Boss in return, but rebels at the wedding and attempts to kill Satan. After killing his minions with Kinzie's help, Johnny defeats Satan.

Kinzie, the Boss, and Jezebel are banished back to the mortal realm, while Johnny is detained by God (Nathan Fillion). God reveals that Satan was plotting an invasion of Heaven since Zinyak hastened the Apocalypse by destroying Earth, hoping to use the Boss as the general of his army, and offers to repay Johnny for defeating Satan, leading to one of five endings. Johnny either: goes to Heaven to be reunited with his girlfriend Aisha, returns to Hell to become its new king, has the Saints find a new homeworld to rebuild humanity, has Earth recreated, or is told the secrets of the universe. Recreating Earth leads to the events of Agents of Mayhem; the universe of Saints Row is retconed, and Johnny becomes a lieutenant within the Seoul police force, hoping to find his friends. As Kinzie and Matt Miller (Yuri Lowenthal) converse about a captured woman named "Brimstone", Johnny prepares to interrogate her.

== Development ==
In December 2013, comedian Jay Mohr, who voiced antagonist Dane Vogel in Saints Row 2, revealed that he was doing voice work for the next Saints Row game. It was later revealed that Volition would be unveiling a new game at PAX Prime on August 29, 2014. They teased an image depicting a Ouija board with the Saints' fleur-de-lis on it. Later, at their panel on the same day, Volition and Deep Silver confirmed a standalone expansion to Saints Row IV, called Saints Row: Gat out of Hell. The game was initially scheduled for release on January 27, 2015, for the PlayStation 3, PlayStation 4, Windows, Xbox 360, and Xbox One but was later rescheduled to January 20, 2015, in North America and January 23, 2015, in Europe. The game was released in a bundle alongside Saints Row IV: Re-Elected for the PlayStation 4 and Xbox One.

The expansion was inspired, in part, by Disney films, which are among the "big loves" of the game's creative director, Steve Jaros. He wanted the game to parody the fairytale qualities and "whimsical love songs" of the Disney film genre. Parts of the plot were taken from such films, including the birthday party prologue from Sleeping Beauty, talking inanimate objects, princess Jezebel rebelling against her father, Satan, through her spousal choice, and musical acts where Satan sings sentimentally. The open world was designed to be a "fun toy box" that encouraged traversal through flight. The January 2015 launch trailer included a hotline phone number with promotional hold music.

== Reception ==
Reception

Aggregate score
Aggregator	Score
Metacritic	(PC) 66/100 (XONE) 65/100 (PS4) 64/100

Review scores
Publication	Score
Destructoid	8/10
Eurogamer	6/10
Game Informer	7.5/10
GameSpot	7/10
GamesRadar+	2.5/5
Giant Bomb	3/5
IGN	7.8/10
PC Gamer (US)	67/100
VideoGamer.com	7/10
Hardcore Gamer	3.5/5

Saints Row: Gat out of Hell received generally mixed reviews. Aggregating review website Metacritic gave the Microsoft Windows version a score of 66/100 based on 24 reviews, the Xbox One version a 65/100 based on 16 reviews, and the PlayStation 4 version a 64/100 based on 45 reviews.

Brittany Vincent from Destructoid gave the game an 8/10, praising the setting, refreshing superpower abilities, new cast of characters, interesting types of enemies and entertaining world, which she stated "feels much more polished and finished than Saints Row IV's Steelport simulation." However, she criticized the game's short length. She summarized the review by saying "There's no agenda and no life lessons to learn in Saints Row. There's only pure escapism, which is what games are meant for in my view. Whenever I feel like I need a break, I will have Saints Row proudly on my shelf." Andrew Reiner from Game Informer gave the game a 7.5/10, praising the worthwhile side-activities, well-designed dialogues, satisfying transversal system, creative weapons and storytelling. However, he criticized the graphics, which he stated were on par with the last-generation version of Saints Row IV, as well as occasional framerate losses. He also criticized the game for lacking in gameplay complexity.

Mikel Reparaz from IGN criticized the game for lacking traditional story missions, as well as featuring repetitive side missions, unimpressive graphics, and being extremely buggy. Alex Carlson from Hardcore Gamer gave the game a 3.5/5, praising the voice-acting, dialogues, collectibles, flight mechanics and the open world, which he stated "has a balance between familiar and fresh", but criticizing the game for being too similar to the original Saints Row IV in terms of the variety of superpower and mission types, as well as the middling story and graphical glitches. Phil Savage from PC Gamer gave the game a 67/100, praising the world design and in-game abilities such as flying, which he stated "has delivered a new sense of freedom". However, he criticized the lack of proper campaign missions and scripting, limited creativity as well as the poor combat system. He ended the review by saying that "Gat out of Hell offers all the open-world distractions of a Saints Row game, but it seldom displays the spark of creativity, which made [Saints Row: The Third and Saints Row IV] so remarkable."
