= Saints Row IV =

2013 action-adventure game

- Developer: Volition (Note: High Voltage Software developed the PS4 and Xbox One versions. Fishlabs developed the Nintendo Switch version.)
- Publisher: Deep Silver
- Producer: Jim Boone
- Designer: Scott Phillips
- Programmer: Ryan Spencer
- Artist: Stephen Quirk
- Writers: Jason L. Blair; Jeffrey Bielawski; Tony Bedard
- Composers: Malcolm Kirby, Jr.
- Series: Saints Row
- Platforms: Microsoft Windows; PlayStation 3; Xbox 360; PlayStation 4; Xbox One; Linux; Nintendo Switch; Stadia
- Release: August 20, 2013: Microsoft Windows, PlayStation 3, Xbox 360; NA: August 20, 2013; EU: August 23, 2013; AU: September 12, 2013 PlayStation 4, Xbox One; NA: January 20, 2015; EU: January 23, 2015 Linux; WW: December 21, 2015 Nintendo Switch; WW: March 27, 2020 Stadia; WW: November 1, 2021
- Genre: Action-adventure
- Modes: Single-player, multiplayer

Saints Row IV is a 2013 action-adventure game developed by Volition and published by Deep Silver. It is the sequel to 2011's Saints Row: The Third, the fourth game in the Saints Row series, and the final main installment of the original series that began with 2006's Saints Row. The game was released in August 2013 for Microsoft Windows, PlayStation 3, and Xbox 360, and was later ported to the PlayStation 4, Xbox One, and Linux in 2015. A Nintendo Switch port was released on March 27, 2020, and a Google Stadia port was released on November 1, 2021.

The game's open world nature allows players to freely explore a simulation of the fictional city of Steelport while completing main and side missions at their leisure. It incorporates science fiction elements, and continues the series' reputation for over-the-top parody. The single-player story follows the same player-created character from the previous games, who is elected President of the United States after thwarting a terrorist threat. Five years into their governance, they find themselves trapped in the Steelport simulation along with members of their gang, the 3rd Street Saints, after an alien empire known as the Zin attacks the Earth and captures them. With the help of their allies who managed to escape and hacked the simulation to give them superpowers, the player attempts to rescue their captured friends, escape the simulation, and defeat the Zin.

Saints Row IV was the first game developed by Volition after its acquisition by Koch Media in early 2013, following the bankruptcy proceedings of the franchise's original publisher, THQ. The supernatural and superpower concept for the game started in Enter the Dominatrix, a cancelled expansion planned for Saints Row: The Third, which the team expanded into Saints Row IV. Volition later released a "director's cut" of Enter the Dominatrix as a downloadable content for Saints Row IV alongside another expansion, How the Saints Saved Christmas, as well as various weapons, costumes, and vehicle packs. A standalone expansion, Saints Row: Gat out of Hell, was released in January 2015, serving as an epilogue to the base game.

The game received several limited and summative edition releases, and was briefly banned in Australia. It received positive reviews from critics, who praised its humor and character customization options, but criticized its lack of challenge. It sold over one million units in its first week. The next game in the series, a reboot titled Saints Row, was released in August 2022.

== Gameplay ==
Similar to previous Saints Row games, Saints Row IV is an open world action game with third-person shooter elements wherein the player is free to explore the environment and, at their leisure, play story or side missions. As the leader of the Saints, a street gang that has become the world's most "powerful and popular" organization, the player is elected President of the United States, receives superpowers, and fends off an alien invasion. Most often the player will engage in shooting and racing activities, though other activities vary from fighting crowds of zombies, shoot-outs in tanks, side-scrolling brawlers, fights against supersized, daikaiju energy drink cans, and using a dubstep gun to interrupt 1950s Americana. The player-character receives elemental powers and superpowers that greatly increase their jump height and running speed, such that the player can hop over buildings and outrun vehicles. The elemental powers include abilities to shoot fire and ice projectiles, telekinetically toss objects, and create shockwaves upon landing jumps. As the player progresses through the game, they can optionally upgrade their abilities and weapons skill tree by using collectible "data clusters" scattered around town. If the player becomes too rowdy, the alien race's police analogue will intervene. As in previous games, the player-character's look and feel is entirely customizable via a robust character editor feature.

The game is set in a nearly identical simulation of Steelport, the fictional city setting from Saints Row: The Third, though individual story missions have new, custom-designed levels. Saints Row IV's story parodies science fiction video games, mostly Mass Effect 2, as well as films like The Matrix and Zero Dark Thirty, and other "nerd culture". Some story missions are propelled by individual characters' existential crises, as each Saint character is stuck in a personal simulation of their own hell, and must be rescued by the player. Other elements borrowed from video game culture include BioWare-style character romances and a Metal Gear-style mission with an unhelpful partner.

City districts are "liberated" from alien occupation as the player completes side missions in occupied districts. Liberated districts increase the player's hourly income, which can be spent on weapons, skills, and perks. Side missions include Insurance Fraud (where the player jumps into traffic to collect insurance money), demolition derby-style Mayhem, and superpowered foot races. Saints Row IV has a two-player cooperative mode.

== Plot ==
A few months after the events of Saints Row: The Third, the 3rd Street Saints are called to assist MI6 agent Asha Odekar (Rebecca Riedy) and former Deckers leader Matt Miller (Yuri Lowenthal) in foiling a terrorist plot by former S.T.A.G. leader Cyrus Temple (Richard Epcar). The Boss (Troy Baker, Kenn Michael, Robin Atkin Downes, Laura Bailey, Diane Michelle, Sumalee Montano, or Nolan North) and the Saints' top lieutenants, Shaundi (Danielle Nicolet) and Pierce Washington (Arif S. Kinchen), breach Cyrus' base with Asha, killing him and preventing a nuclear missile from hitting Washington, D.C. Five years later, the Boss has been elected President of the United States for this act of heroism, receiving actor Keith David (himself) as Vice President while assigning the Cabinet roles to their fellow Saints, Asha, Matt, and former Vice Kings leader Benjamin King (Terry Crews). Moments into a press conference, Earth is hit by an invasion from an alien empire known as the Zin, led by the ruthless Zinyak (JB Blanc), who destroys the White House and abducts the Boss, Keith, and most of the Cabinet.

The Boss is trapped in a computer simulation based on a 1950s sitcom—their worst nightmare—but manages to escape to a different simulation based on Steelport with the help of the Saints' hacker specialist, Kinzie Kensington (Natalie Lander). Working to manipulate the environment with special powers, the Boss eventually leaves the simulation and reunites with Kinzie and Keith in a stolen Zin ship. When the group try to contact other Saints for help, Zinyak stops them by destroying the Earth. Enraged, the Boss re-enters the Steelport simulation to find the others that the Zin abducted, rescuing each from simulations based on their personal nightmares.

Zinyak responds by having the Steelport simulation flooded with replicas of gang members the Boss faced before, which causes Kinzie to suspect he is drawing them from the memories of someone else who has fought them. The Boss deduces that the Zin abducted Johnny Gat (Daniel Dae Kim), who was supposedly killed years ago, but is the only other Saint who was in the gang longer than them. Despite concerns from their allies, the Boss ventures into Gat's own simulated nightmare—a recreation of Aisha's murder—and helps him escape. Reuniting with his friends, Gat explains that Zinyak had captured him years ahead of Earth's invasion, believing he could have thwarted it on his own, and officially rejoins the Saints.

The Saints soon rally inside the simulation to confront Zinyak, only for Kinzie to be captured in the real world by Zin forces. Discovering that Keith betrayed them, the Boss confronts him and learns he did so in exchange for the Zin restoring the Earth. With the help of Roddy Piper, the Boss rescues Keith from his own nightmare world and reveals that he has been tricked, convincing Keith to rejoin the Saints. Learning where Kinzie was taken, the Boss rescues her from her personal nightmare—another 1950s sitcom simulation, controlled by a recreated Cyrus Temple.

With the Saints back in operation, Kinzie formulates a plan to board Zinyak's ship by overloading the Steelport simulation to create an opening. Upon the Saints achieving this, the Boss boards Zinyak's ship, steals power armor that emulates their powers from the simulation, and uses it to kill Zinyak in front of the Zin, seizing control of their empire. The game's ending depends on the number of optional "Loyalty" missions completed. If any of them were omitted, the Boss plans for the Saints to conquer a new homeworld, starting the "Saints Empire." Otherwise, the Saints learn they can restore the Earth using time travel, after discovering that Zinyak has captured several historical figures and placed them in suspended animation. The Boss decides to awaken one of them from stasis, namely 19th-century writer Jane Austen (Eden Riegel), whom they are a fan of, and who reveals herself as the game's narrator once she awakens.

== Development ==
After the release of Saints Row: The Third, preliminary work on a game called Saints Row: Part Four began. The game would take place after the events of The Third in a new city and feature gameplay similar to The Third. Meanwhile, a standalone expansion to The Third called Enter the Dominatrix was first announced as a 2012 April Fool's joke, but still went into development. The expansion pack's basic concept included a superpowered player-character trapped by alien commander Zinyak in a simulation of Steelport. With THQ suffering financially, its president Jason Rubin encouraged company subsidiary and Saints Row series developer Volition to grow elements from the expansion into a full game. The company announced this change in direction in June 2012, cancelling Saints Row: Part Four and expanding Enter the Dominatrix into a full sequel, Saints Row IV. The company's strategy was partly to avoid sales issues by releasing the game in August 2013, prior to the circulation of rumors about next generation video game consoles. Volition was sold to Koch Media in early 2013 when its parent company, THQ, filed for bankruptcy. It became Koch's first internal video game studio. The studio officially announced Saints Row IV two months later, which was published by Koch Media brand Deep Silver. Acquired without rights to their Red Faction series, Volition's new goals were to make connected, open world games where "the player is an agent of mayhem". The entire company worked on the one game.

Each of the Saints Row series games had a core intent, and while the first three games built on the first's "outlandishness and irreverence", the fourth focused on "the supernatural and superpowers". Senior producer Jim Boone recalled reviewers that asked whether the company could be "more over-the-top" than Saints Row: The Third, which they took as a challenge. The team focused more on making the game "fun" than "for the sake of being over the top", and felt that superpowers helped the game's basic navigation and combat. They also chose to remove the previous game's in-game mobile phone-based navigation, which hindered its narration, and replaced it with a "quest log structure". The team chose not to devote as much time improving the game's graphics, considering the impending release of next generation platforms. The game spent less time in development than prior series games.

In August 2014, Volition announced that they would be releasing a development kit for the Windows version of the game, which lets players modify game assets and create new weapons. Support for modding via Steam Workshop integration was added in November 2016.

The in-game radio has seven pre-programmed radio stations and 109 licensed tracks. The game's original soundtrack is composed by Malcolm Kirby Jr., who also composed the previous game's soundtrack.

== Release ==
Saints Row IV was released for Microsoft Windows, PlayStation 3, and Xbox 360 in North America on August 20, 2013, and worldwide on three days later. Preorders included a patriot-themed downloadable content pack that included flamethrower, dubstep, and rocket launcher weapons, a bald eagle jet, and an Uncle Sam outfit. A limited edition release of the game included a replica of the game's dubstep gun, a doomsday button, and Johnny Gat statuette. Another limited edition release, the Game of the Generation Edition, included the previous items as well as a display case for the game. The game was originally refused ratings classification and effectively banned in Australia but was later accepted when modified to remove the offending content. The country's PlayStation 4 release was later recalled due to a classification error.

Saints Row IV was released in several summative editions. The Game of the Century edition included 20 downloadable content sets and was released May 9, 2014. The National Treasure Edition included 29 downloadable content sets and was released on July 8, 2014. High Voltage Software ported the game to PlayStation 4 and Xbox One with all of its downloadable content as Saints Row IV: Re-Elected. It was announced in late August 2014 alongside Saints Row: Gat out of Hell, a standalone Saints Row IV expansion developed by Volition in conjunction with High Voltage. Both were released in North America on January 20, 2015, and worldwide three days later, both separately and bundled together. The release included new features such as voice commands. A Linux port was presented in December 2015. Re-Elected was released for the Nintendo Switch on March 27, 2020.

=== Downloadable content ===
The game received multiple downloadable content (DLC) packs after release. A Season Pass, which features two exclusive mission packs, was announced ahead to the game's launch. The first DLC, GAT V, which adds Johnny Gat-inspired weapons and character customization options, was released for free on 17 September 2013, to coincide with the release of the rival open world game Grand Theft Auto V (GTA V). The first mission pack, Enter the Dominatrix, was released October 22, 2013. The pack was originally intended as a mission pack for Saints Row: The Third but evolved into the full sequel, Saints Row IV. The leftover content became the sequel's first mission pack. It tells an alternative story about the Zin invasion wherein the Steelport simulation is hijacked by a rogue artificial intelligence called the Dominatrix. The pack's storytelling frequently breaks the fourth wall and self-referentially acknowledges its own plot holes and incongruence with the larger Saints Row story. Some scenes end in concept art or videos of Volition employees acting out the drama so as to give the game an unfinished feel. The pack also casts characters from Saints Row: The Third who did not return in the sequel. There are five missions in total, new weapons, vehicles, and computer-controlled support characters ("homies"). The second and final mission pack, How the Saints Save Christmas, features new weapons and vehicles, and a three-mission storyline about the Saints rescuing Santa Claus from the Steelport simulation. It was released in December 2013. Non-mission downloadable content packs include new costumes, vehicles, and weapons (e.g., face masks of United States Presidents George Washington, Abraham Lincoln, George W. Bush, and Barack Obama).

=== Re-Elected Edition upgrade ===
On December 8, 2022, a free update to all existing Windows versions of the game on Steam and GOG brought it to a new "Re-Elected Edition" which includes all DLC released for the title; this was alongside a free giveaway offer for the game on the Epic Games Store. The Re-Elected Edition supports cross-play between the Steam, GOG and Epic editions of the game. Previous versions of Saints Row IV were subsequently removed from sale, but existing saves and achievements carried over into the new version.

== Reception ==
Reception

Aggregate score
Aggregator	Score
Metacritic	(PC) 86/100 (X360) 81/100 (PS3) 76/100 (PS4) 75/100 (XONE) 73/100

Review scores
Publication	Score
Destructoid	9.5/10
Eurogamer	8/10
GameSpot	7.5/10
IGN	7.3/10
PC Gamer (US)	90/100
Polygon	9/10
USgamer	4.5/5

The game received generally positive reviews on PC, PlayStation 3, PlayStation 4, and Xbox 360 according to video game review aggregator website Metacritic. On Xbox One and Nintendo Switch, it received mixed reviews. Reviewers praised its over-the-top humor and character customization options, and criticized its lack of challenge. Several also commented on its "even-handed treatment" of gender, particularly female characters, and spotlighted hacker and former FBI agent Kinzie Kensington's character performance. Saints Row IV sold over one million copies in its first week, and as of 2013, Volition has not released total sales figures.

Polygon's Danielle Riendeau described Saints Row IV as "big, goofy, and self-referential fun" and thought that the game accomplished what it set out to be: "an outrageous exercise in player power fantasy". She also praised the game's degree of freedom around character identity, its "dumb and lovable" narrative, and its transitions between varied sequences. Riendeau wrote that Volition "trimmed the fat" from previous games, and that their addition of superpowers "blew the constraints off a genre already known for player freedom". She considered the story funny and "as obvious as can be", but found its characters "well-realized". Riendeau particularly praised the game's "treatment of gender"—bold female characters who could pursue same-sex relationships or even switch their gender mid-game, and were not treated differently for being female—but found the game's continued association between women and sex workers "problematic" and a "vestige from the series' roots as a juvenile crime drama".

Reflecting on the series' progression, Eurogamer's Chris Schilling said that Saints Row IV successfully reinvented the series yet again, with superpowers replacing the usefulness of in-game vehicles. He compared the game's exploration mechanics to that of Crackdown, and its superpowers to the Infamous and Prototype series, and added that the game's silliness fulfilled a specific niche in gaming. Schilling wrote that the need to restock at ammo shops was a "jarring holdover" from the previous games, but appreciated the recurrence of elements such as the GPS navigation system, side mission gameplay, and city district liberation. He regarded the game overall as artful but "gloriously dumb", like "the Sistine Chapel ceiling of stupidity". Schilling also commented on how he felt an urge to simply forgo the story to search for collectibles, though despite these options, the game became "wearying" over long play sessions.

Similarly, Dan Stapleton of IGN became bored when his superhero protagonist had little "to overcome", and ultimately likened the game to "enabling god-like cheat codes" in its predecessor. He wrote that it was very difficult to die, given the large amount of power-ups dropped by enemies, and that the otherwise praiseworthy features from Saints Row: The Third felt "vestigial" when outmoded by superpowers. Stapleton said the player received the powers too early, which let the player play without caring about the city, and thus removed the "sense of place and character it had in the previous game". He considered the game's large number of collectibles an acknowledgement of this hole, which while originally rewarding, quickly becomes a "chore". Stapleton praised the Red Faction-style Disintegrator and Abductor guns, though considered the dubstep gun an "ineffective disappointment". As a symbol, though, Polygon described the dubstep gun as "iconic" of Saints Row IV.

== Reboot ==
In August 2019, a new Saints Row game was hinted to be "deep in development" by Volition. As of late 2020, it was still in development. In August 2021, the new game was confirmed to be a reboot to the franchise. Titled simply Saints Row, it was released for the PlayStation 4, PlayStation 5, Xbox One, Xbox Series X/S, and Windows on August 23, 2022.
