= Volition (company) =

American video game developer

Volition Games, LLC
- The 2013 variant of Jasen Whiteside's initial logo

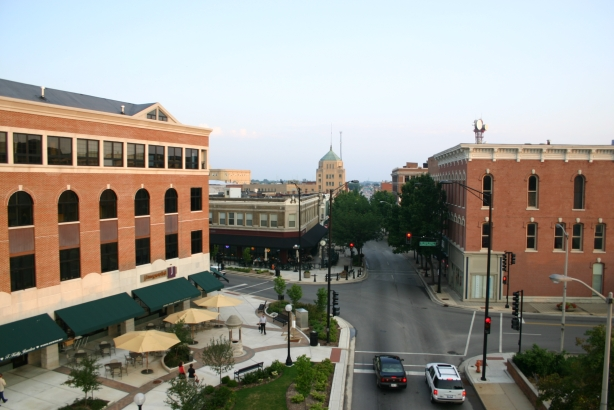
- Headquarters at One Main, Champaign, Illinois (left; pictured in 2007)
- Formerly: Volition, Inc. (1996–2013); Deep Silver Volition, LLC (2013–2022)
- Type: Subsidiary
- Industry: Video games
- Founded: November 1996; 29 years ago
- Founders: Mike Kulas
- Defunct: August 31, 2023; 3 years ago
- Headquarters: Champaign, Illinois, US
- Key people: Mike Kulas (president, 1996–2011; general manager, 2019–2020); Dan Cermak (vice president, 2003–2011; general manager, 2011–2017); Jim Boone (studio development director, 2017–2020; CCO, 2020–2023); Jim Torbit (general manager, 2020–2023)
- Products: FreeSpace series (1998–1999); Summoner series (2000–2002); Red Faction series (2001–2011); Saints Row series (2006–2022)
- Number of employees: 236 (2021)
- Parent: THQ (2000–2013); Deep Silver (2013–2022); Gearbox Entertainment (2022–2023)
- Website: volitiongames.com

Volition (Volition Games, LLC; formerly Volition, Inc. and Deep Silver Volition, LLC) was an American video game developer based in Champaign, Illinois. It is best known for its Red Faction and Saints Row series. Mike Kulas founded the company in November 1996 when he and Matt Toschlog split up Parallax Software, the developer they had founded in June 1993. At Parallax Software, Kulas and Toschlog had developed Descent (1995) and Descent II (1996) for Interplay Entertainment, which Volition followed with Descent: FreeSpace – The Great War (1998) and FreeSpace 2 (1999), while Toschlog's Outrage Entertainment developed Descent 3 (1999). Volition's Descent 4 was canceled and reworked into Red Faction (2001). The game, as well as Summoner (2000), was published by THQ, which acquired the studio in August 2000.

Following its 2004 move to downtown Champaign, Volition expanded rapidly from 80 employees to 175 by November 2006. With this increased headcount, the studio created the Saints Row series in 2006 and developed two further entries in the Red Faction series in 2009 and 2011. Kulas left the company in May 2011. During the development of Saints Row IV (2013), THQ filed for bankruptcy in December 2012, with Volition and the Saints Row intellectual property (IP) acquired by Koch Media for its Deep Silver label in January 2013. Embracer Group acquired the Summoner and Red Faction IPs, while Interplay obtained FreeSpace. The studio developed the Saints Row spin-off Agents of Mayhem (2017) and the series reboot Saints Row (2022) to no commercial success. Embracer Group, which had since acquired Koch Media, subsequently transferred Volition to Gearbox Entertainment in November 2022 and closed it in August 2023.

== History ==
=== Parallax Software and Descent (1993–1995) ===
The programmers Mike Kulas and Matt Toschlog first met in 1986 at Sublogic, a software company developing flight simulators. Kulas, originally from Morton Grove, Illinois, had moved to Champaign, Illinois, in 1979 to attend the University of Illinois Urbana-Champaign. He had considered video game development to be more of a hobby than a career but, after dropping out in 1981, learned about and joined the Champaign-based Sublogic. Toschlog had grown up on the East Coast and attended Christiana High School before joining Sublogic in 1986. Toschlog left Sublogic in 1988 to work on Car and Driver on a freelance basis, being joined by Kulas in 1990. In April 1993, they drafted a two-page sketch for an original game, but their pitch to LookingGlass Technologies was turned down as they sought to retain full ownership of their products. Believing that running a company would not be difficult and assured that returning to other employers was a feasible fallback, Kulas and Toschlog decided to quit their jobs and pursue the development of their game. They established Parallax Software on June 1, 1993.

The nascent company pitched the game with the two-page draft to Apogee Software, known for publishing games by id Software. Apogee Software liked the idea and provided Parallax Software with a $10,000 check for hardware purchases before a publishing agreement was signed. The studio subsequently hired John Slagel as a programmer and Che-Yuan Wang, who, although also a programmer by trade, worked mostly on level design. It moved into an office in Champaign's Huntington Towers, which also housed Sublogic. Toschlog worked remotely from Boston before joining Kulas in Champaign to lower his cost of living. The team developed a concept for a game called Inferno, which they formally pitched to Apogee Software for a publishing contract. While the development was ongoing, Kulas felt that Apogee Software wanted Parallax Software to create a clone of id Software's Doom, which the studio did not want to do. After seven months, in January 1994, Apogee Software backed out of the contract after seeing an early prototype. Parallax Software had just hired Adam Pletcher, a graduate of Purdue University and the company's first out-of-town hire, having previously lacked an artist. Furthermore, Kulas's wife Karen was five months pregnant at the time. Without a publisher, the studio could only afford to continue operations for two more months, prompting the five-person team to assemble a demo within a few weeks and pitch it to several publishers. Parallax Software received offers from Accolade, Interplay, and Trimark Interactive, with Interplay viewing the game as a potential Doom killer. The studio chose Interplay and signed a publishing deal "just in time". Jasen Whiteside soon became Parallax Software's eighth employee, working on level design while studying industrial design.

The shareware version of Inferno, now titled Descent, was released on December 23, 1994. The free portion featured seven of the game's thirty levels and was distributed online, including over Apogee Software's Software Creations bulletin board system. It was Interplay's first shareware release. Kulas and Toschlog observed the game's positive reception while staying with their respective families over the Christmas break. Interplay viewed the response as validation of its expectations. Descent cost roughly $400,000–$450,000 to develop. These costs exhausted Interplay's advances, yet Parallax Software declined to request additional funding, instead investing personal funds. The game was completed in February 1995 after twenty months of work and released in March. By this time, Parallax Software comprised nine full-time employees, five of whom were programmers. Interplay subsequently agreed in April 1995 to publish Parallax Software's next four games and license Descent's game engine for up to six titles.

=== Descent II and split of Parallax Software (1995–1997) ===
Following the completion of Descent, Kulas and Toschlog agreed that they did not wish to remain in Champaign in the long term. However, they could not decide where to relocate the company and instead chose to set up a second office. Toschlog, alongside three designers, moved to Ann Arbor, Michigan, where he hired two additional programmers. His wife began attending graduate school at the University of Michigan. The office was established on the outskirts of the city, near Packard Street and East Stadium Boulevard, and cost $1,000 per month to rent. Travel between the two studios took five hours. The two offices began developing Descent II simultaneously. Interplay devised the second game as an enhanced version of the original, including additional features and more levels, while marketing it as a sequel under the terms of the original contract. The development was planned to take four months but ultimately lasted a year. Like its predecessor, the game was commercially successful. Combined sales reached several hundred thousand copies.

Despite this success, the teams found it difficult to manage game development across two distant locations. In 1996, Kulas and Toschlog agreed to spin off the two studios into separate companies. Kulas asked his employees to suggest names for the Champaign studio before postponing the decision. When he realized that he needed a name to file the required paperwork, he disliked all of the approximately fifty suggestions and instead began searching through the books in his living room. He found "volition" defined as "an intense, active will to accomplish something", which he likened to team-driven software development, and thus settled on it as the company name. To create a logo for Volition, Kulas handed the definition to his employees and asked for their designs. Although he was not impressed by any of them, most staff preferred a logo featuring a black-and-white face superimposed on the capital letter "V". The logo was designed by Whiteside, inspired by that of Wax Trax! Records, and Pletcher created the accompanying font for the company name. The design was retained permanently. Kulas founded Volition, Inc. in November 1996 and hired all thirteen staff members from Parallax Software's Champaign office. The Ann Arbor office, which had since been moved downtown, became Outrage Entertainment by December 1996. The studio had 10 employees in August 1997. Parallax Software continued as a shell company that held the copyright to the Descent series. Following the split, under the agreement with Interplay, Volition and Outrage were each to create two games for the publisher. While Outrage developed Descent 3, Volition began work on a spin-off, Descent: FreeSpace – The Great War. The split and both games were announced on December 1, 1997.

=== Early years as Volition and acquisition by THQ (1998–2003) ===
FreeSpace was heavily inspired by Star Wars: X-Wing and Star Wars: TIE Fighter. During its development, the team doubled in size, requiring existing members to spend significant time training new employees. Meanwhile, Kulas split his time between programming and managerial tasks, halting the former when he had to attend to business matters. FreeSpace was the last Volition game to which Kulas significantly contributed programming. Interplay released FreeSpace in June 1998, followed in October by the expansion Silent Threat. With FreeSpace complete, Volition began working on four games simultaneously: FreeSpace 2, Descent 4, Summoner, and Tube Racer. The latter was canceled six to nine months into development, while the others were in early production when they were announced in December 1998. FreeSpace 2 was overseen at Interplay by Darrell Jones, with Jim Boone as the producer. It was completed in roughly a year, though development was cut short by two months just three months before the intended finish. Kulas believed that Interplay, which had recently become a public company, sought to release the game in an earlier fiscal quarter to publish better returns. Although the game was one of Volition's best-received titles, it underperformed commercially, which Kulas attributed to Interplay's failure to adjust its marketing strategy for the advanced release date. Boone attributed the lack of sales to the declining popularity of joysticks.

Summoner was Volition's first attempt at a role-playing video game, a genre in which the team had no experience. As Descent 4 would fulfill the studio's obligations to Interplay and the publisher already had sufficient titles in that genre, Volition pitched the game to several other publishers. THQ ultimately agreed to publish the game in July 1999. The two companies also briefly worked on a role-playing game based on the Harry Potter books, which was unsuccessfully pitched to its rightsholders. Meanwhile, Outrage Entertainment and its twenty employees, having finished their work on Descent 3 by late 1999, began pitching two non-Descent games to publishers. Toschlog stated that he was "ready for something new" after working on the series for six years. Interplay took on Rubu Tribe, an adventure game for the PlayStation 2, which it later handled through its Digital Mayhem division. THQ picked up the other game. Summoner was Volition's largest project to that point, with thirty to forty people working on it at once. The publisher eventually began discussions to make Volition an internal studio, acquiring it on August 31, 2000. THQ paid 890,100 shares of common stock, plus 109,900 shares in options, while assuming $500,000 in liabilities from the studio. Kulas remained the studio manager. Despite initial concerns, the developers retained creative freedom under the new ownership. Summoner, originally designed for personal computers (PCs), became a launch title for the PlayStation 2, which launched in October 2000.

Descent 4 was intended to be the fourth main entry in the Descent series, but Interplay faced financial difficulties around the release of Descent 3 and refused to continue funding its development. Volition parted ways with the publisher and chose to repurpose the existing work into an original game, Red Faction. The project shifted from a space combat game to a first-person shooter with an emphasis on destructible environments. Following these changes, many staff members felt that Red Faction would become a "ground pounder", a game requiring significant effort but ultimately failing critically. Contrary to these expectations, the game was positively received upon its release in May 2001. The development cost $3 million over three years. In the following year, Volition and THQ released Summoner 2, aiming to address shortcomings of the original, and Red Faction II. To the team's disappointment, the latter was not received as well as its predecessor and was internally considered a failure. Plans for a third Summoner game and a third Red Faction game were discarded. The team behind the canceled Summoner project began developing a heist game titled Underground, working on it for approximately one year. One unrealized demo of the game revolved around the comic character Batman. When the marketing department determined that the Grand Theft Auto trilogy had raised expectations for interactivity in open world games too high, Underground was also canceled.

In the meantime, Outrage Entertainment (later renamed Outrage Games) was acquired by THQ in April 2002. The publisher subsequently canceled Rubu Tribe, which Interplay had stopped funding, and instead assigned it to develop ports of Red Faction II for Windows and the Xbox, which were released in 2003. THQ quietly shut down Outrage Games after the release of Alter Echo in mid-2003, leading the team to disperse. Toschlog took time off to care for his one-year-old son full-time, aside from some contract work, before co-founding the Reactor Zero video game division for the Ann Arbor company Quantum Signal in 2005.

=== Expansion, Saints Row, and Kulas's departure (2003–2011) ===
In March 2003, Volition broke ground for the One Main building on the corner of Main Street and Neil Street in downtown Champaign. Kulas sought additional office space for Volition and worked with the commercial real estate developer Jon Sokolski on the plans. Kulas had first floated the idea of moving Volition downtown in August 2002 but considered it infeasible at the time. They came to jointly own the building through their Sokolski/Kulas Ownership Group, and each paid the city $500,000 for the land. Also in 2003, Volition worked with Habitat for Humanity and the Philo Road Church of Christ to build a home for a low-income family in neighboring Urbana. The company dispatched fifteen employees to help on-site and donated $55,000, of which Habitat for Humanity retained the remainder for future projects. Volition moved into One Main with about 80 employees in April 2004, occupying the third floor, half of the available commercial space. There, the company quickly grew to 107 employees by July and soon expanded to nearly half of the second floor, employing 115 people by November. As part of this expansion, Kulas hired Dan Cermak as Volition's vice president in 2003. Cermak soon replaced the studio's flat hierarchy with a corporate structure that better suited the increased headcount.

Around this time, THQ approached Volition with the idea of developing a licensed game based on the Punisher from Marvel Comics in tandem with the upcoming film. The studio, which had several Punisher fans, put together a concept that was ultimately greenlit. The development team visited Marvel's film studios, where they observed the production, spoke with stage designers, and witnessed scenes being filmed. Prior to release, Volition had to remove or tone down several violent torture scenes to avoid "Adults Only" classifications, which retailers typically refused to carry. The Punisher was released in January 2005. By October, the company employed 140 people. The studio's other game at the time, Bling Bling, originated from a design exercise among Volition employees. One concept was a "gang simulator" in the form of a first-person shooter, which, at the behest of Cermak, evolved into an open world game. Cermak believed this would allow the studio to exploit a genre with a wide target audience in which Grand Theft Auto was the sole major competitor. The studio pitched the game in 2003, at a time when THQ was described by Cermak as a "wrestling and kids game company". Despite hesitance from THQ and some Volition staff due to the game's theme, it was greenlit and assigned a budget of $8–9 million, which the studio ultimately exceeded. Bling Bling was released as Saints Row in 2006 and became a critical and commercial success, selling 2 million copies for the Xbox 360. Because the game received some criticism for its similarities to Grand Theft Auto, the sequel, Saints Row 2, was developed with a much greater focus on humor. This distinct style of humor became a defining characteristic of the series.

In November 2006, Volition had 175 employees and continued to plan for further growth. Kulas believed there was no need to relocate from One Main, as the 50,000 square feet (4,600 m^{2}) it occupied could accommodate the company for several more years. He did not join Sokolski in the nearby "M2 on Neal" building project, preferring to focus on Volition rather than real estate ventures. Additional employees were hired from Motorola when it closed its Urbana-Champaign Design Center and laid off 183 workers in 2007. Three former Volition developers—Sandeep Shekar, Jiovanie Velazquez, and Christopher Stockman—founded Blazing Lizard in March 2007 and created Pirates vs. Ninjas Dodgeball. In early 2008, Volition opened a quality assurance (QA) facility for THQ at Church Street Square, one block from One Main. The facility aimed to hire 120 personnel to test games for several THQ studios. By October, Volition employed 325 people, including 75 testers, with 165 people working on Saints Row 2. Saints Row 2 was released later that month and sold 2.6 million copies within four months. Despite this, THQ posted a $191.8 million quarterly net loss and announced plans to cut 24% of its workforce. In April 2009, it announced the closure of the QA facility, laying off 86 people and transferring the remaining 16 to Volition. The studio was otherwise unaffected, while five other THQ studios were closed.

At Kulas's request to return to destructible environments, enabled by the more advanced hardware of the time, the studio developed Red Faction: Guerrilla, an open world game, over five years with a team of 80 people. Reactor Zero developed the game's PC port. Red Faction: Guerrilla was released in June 2009, and its sales, alongside those of UFC 2009 Undisputed, stabilized THQ's quarterly earnings, with the company expecting to return to profitability in the subsequent months. Red Faction: Guerrilla was followed by a sequel, Red Faction: Armageddon. In April 2011, with the development of Armageddon completed, THQ laid off 16 employees from Volition. Kulas stated that the layoffs stemmed from additional projects the studio had expected to undertake that failed to materialize.

In late April 2011, Kulas announced his departure from the studio, effective May 2, with Cermak taking over as general manager. He stated that no particular event had triggered this decision and that he intended to remain in Champaign. He "goofed off" in the following years until 2014, when he reunited with Toschlog to establish Revival Productions. They were joined by the lead designer Luke Schneider and the artist Chris Claflin. The nascent company developed Overload, a spiritual successor to Descent, which was released in May 2018.

=== Sale to Deep Silver (2010–2016) ===
A third Saints Row game was in development by February 2009. Although only 20% of the development team had worked on prior entries, their humor was retained. The game was released as Saints Row: The Third in November 2011. The development for Saints Row IV began later that year. Saints Row was THQ's largest franchise, representing 10% of the company's $830.8 million in net sales during the 2012 fiscal year. The three games sold over 11 million copies combined. During the Spike Video Game Awards in December 2010, the film director Guillermo del Toro announced Insane, a horror game developed in partnership with Volition, originally slated for a 2013 release. It was to be the first in a trilogy, but THQ canceled the project in August 2012, reassigning the small team to other Volition projects. Concurrently, the company announced that Enter the Dominatrix, initially planned as a standalone expansion for Saints Row: The Third, would instead become a separate game under Jason Rubin, the newly appointed president of THQ.

Despite Saints Row's success, THQ faced financial difficulties. The 2011 uDraw GameTablet accessory sold poorly, leaving 1.4 million units unsold. The company reported losses of $239.9 million by May 2012. On December 19, 2012, THQ and its subsidiaries, including Volition, filed for Chapter 11 bankruptcy. Work at Volition continued as usual despite the bankruptcy. When THQ's assets were sold off in January 2013, Volition and Saints Row were among the most valuable. The analyst Todd Mitchell suggested that a best-case scenario would see Volition acquired by Take-Two Interactive and placed under Rockstar Games. Six companies—Electronic Arts, Koch Media, Take-Two Interactive, Ubisoft, Warner Bros., and an unnamed Chicago group—considered bidding for the studio and series. Koch Media won the auction on January 23 for $22,312,925, outbidding Ubisoft's $5.4 million offer. Koch Media had previously worked with Volition as THQ's distributor in Italy and Spain. Koch Media organized Volition under its Deep Silver publishing label, transitioning the studio to a new legal entity, Deep Silver Volition, LLC. The "Volition" trade name was retained despite the legal name change. Boone, now a senior producer for Volition, expressed enthusiasm for the acquisition, believing Deep Silver better understood the studio's marketing intentions.

Several other THQ intellectual properties (IPs), including Volition's Summoner and Red Faction, were sold in a second auction in April. Nordic Games Licensing, a Swedish holding company, acquired most games at the auction, including both Volition IPs, for $4.9 million. Interplay purchased the FreeSpace IP from THQ in May 2013 for $7,500. Boone noted that some Volition staff had wanted to develop a third FreeSpace game, but the plan never materialized. Interplay attempted a revival with FreeSpace Tactics, a miniatures game designed by Chris Taylor, via a crowdfunding campaign in 2014, which failed to reach its $75,000 funding goal. Interplay began selling off several of its IPs, including Descent and FreeSpace, in 2016.

Deep Silver released Saints Row IV in August 2013, selling 1 million copies in its first week. At the time, Volition employed 200 people. Cermak stated that the team "didn't miss a beat" despite THQ's bankruptcy, and he received the "Entrepreneurial Excellence Management Award" at the Champaign County Economic Development Corporation's ninth annual Innovation Celebration in February 2014. Enter the Dominatrix was eventually released as downloadable content for Saints Row IV. Seeking to expand by up to 100 positions at One Main, Volition requested a $200,000 investment from Champaign to remodel its offices, noting that a relocation outside downtown would otherwise be necessary. Bruce Knight, the city's planning and development director, argued that Volition's downtown location was vital, and the city council approved $3 per square foot for additional space (up to $150,000) and $1,000 per new hire (up to $50,000). Steve Jaros, Volition's creative director, left in September 2014 to join Valve. Saints Row: Gat out of Hell, a standalone expansion for Saints Row IV developed with High Voltage Software, was released in January 2015. In March 2016, Volition employed 250 people with an average annual turnover of 15–20.

=== Saints Row reboot and closure (2017–2023) ===
After Saints Row IV, Volition developed Agents of Mayhem, a game set in the Saints Row universe but separate from the main series. Released in August 2017, the game received mixed reviews and underperformed commercially. Subsequently, about 30 positions, including that of Cermak, were eliminated. Boone replaced Cermak as the studio development director in October 2017, returning after an 18-month tenure at Riot Games. In February 2018, Koch Media was acquired by THQ Nordic (the former Nordic Games Licensing, later Embracer Group), reuniting Volition with Red Faction and Summoner, with Red Faction later formally given to Deep Silver. Volition had 148 employees in December 2018. In January 2019, Kulas returned as Volition's general manager. Revival Productions was being wound down at the time, and Kulas rejoined Volition to leverage his experience as an independent game developer. Jim Torbit soon succeeded Kulas, while Boone became the chief creative officer.

By August 2019, Volition was "deep in development" on a fifth Saints Row title. The studio grew from 174 employees to 236 by August 2021. The new game, a reboot titled Saints Row, adopted a more grounded approach to the series' humor, focusing less on absurdities. Released in August 2022, it received a mixed reception and fell short of management expectations at Embracer Group. In November, Embracer Group reassigned Volition from Deep Silver to Gearbox Entertainment, marking the company's first internal studio transfer. In June 2023, Embracer Group announced a restructuring initiative, including layoffs and studio closures, to reduce its accrued debt. As part of this plan, Volition was closed on August 31, 2023. Consequently, 183 people were laid off. Deep Silver retained Saints Row and Red Faction, announcing that both IPs would "live on". Matthew Karch, the CEO of Embracer Group's Saber Interactive unit, retrospectively criticized Volition as too costly and lacking direction. Shortly after the closure, Matthew Madigan, who had departed Volition in 2017, collaborated with the studio's former creative director Brian Traficante and former producer Rob Loftus to form Shapeshifter Games. Announced in January 2024, the studio began co-developing inXile Entertainment's Clockwork Revolution and had hired over ten former Volition employees by February.

== Games developed ==
List of games developed by Volition
Year	Title	Platform(s)	Publisher(s)
1998	Descent: FreeSpace – The Great War	Amiga, Windows	Interplay Entertainment
1999	FreeSpace 2	Windows	Interplay Entertainment
2000	Summoner	Mac OS, PlayStation 2, Windows	THQ
2001	Red Faction	Mac OS, PlayStation 2, Windows	THQ
2002	Summoner 2	GameCube, PlayStation 2	THQ
2002	Red Faction II	GameCube, PlayStation 2, Windows, Xbox	THQ
2005	The Punisher	PlayStation 2, Windows, Xbox	THQ
2006	Saints Row	Xbox 360	THQ
2008	Saints Row 2	Linux, PlayStation 3, Windows, Xbox 360	THQ
2009	Red Faction: Guerrilla	PlayStation 3, Windows, Xbox 360	THQ
2011	Red Faction: Armageddon	PlayStation 3, Windows, Xbox 360	THQ
2011	Saints Row: The Third	Linux, Nintendo Switch, PlayStation 3, Windows, Xbox 360	THQ
2013	Saints Row IV	Linux, Nintendo Switch, PlayStation 3, PlayStation 4, Stadia, Windows, Xbox 360, Xbox One	Deep Silver
2015	Saints Row: Gat out of Hell	Linux, PlayStation 3, PlayStation 4, Windows, Xbox 360, Xbox One	Deep Silver
2017	Agents of Mayhem	PlayStation 4, Windows, Xbox One	Deep Silver
2022	Saints Row	PlayStation 4, PlayStation 5, Stadia, Windows, Xbox One, Xbox Series X/S	Deep Silver

=== Canceled ===
- Tube Racer
- Untitled Harry Potter game
- Descent 4
- Underground and a Batman demo
- Untitled third Summoner game
- Untitled third Red Faction game
- Insane and two sequels
