= List of Volition games =

Volition was an American video game developer located in Champaign, Illinois. It was founded in 1993 by programmers Mike Kulas and Matt Toschlog as Parallax Software. The company grew to eight employees while developing its first game, the first-person spaceship shooter Descent (1995), which was released to widespread acclaim. After the release of Descent II (1996), the two founders split the company, with Toschlog moving to Michigan with some of the employees and founding Outrage Entertainment, while Kulas remained in Illinois and renamed the company to Volition. Outrage went on to develop Descent 3, while Volition moved on to develop the space combat game Descent: FreeSpace – The Great War (1998), growing to around 20 employees during its development. After it successfully launched, Volition began four separate projects while expanding to around 40 employees; the first, FreeSpace 2, was critically acclaimed but had lower sales than its predecessor; two other games—Descent 4 and Tube Racer—were cancelled; and Summoner (2000), was released as a PlayStation 2 launch title. Volition's previous games had been published by Interplay Entertainment, but the contract had expired and Interplay was not interested in publishing a role-playing video game from Volition; instead, THQ not only agreed to publish Summoner but bought Volition entirely during its development in 2000. It purchased Outrage Entertainment as well in 2002, which remained a separate studio until its closure the following year.

Descent 4 had been cancelled due to Interplay abandoning the project; as Interplay owned the rights to the franchise, Volition reused the assets to make the first person shooter Red Faction (2001). It was followed by Red Faction II (2002) and Summoner 2 (2002). The third games in both of these series were cancelled after sales were lower than expected. At THQ's suggestion, Volition made a tie-in game, The Punisher, for the 2004 film of the same name, which sold well. Volition brainstormed ideas for a new project, and decided to make an open world action-adventure "gang simulator", Saints Row (2006), as the Grand Theft Auto franchise was the only major series in the genre. THQ was hesitant about the idea, but Volition convinced them that the humorous tone of the game would offset the subject matter. Volition expanded to over 100 employees working on the game during development. The game sold very well, and the company moved on to make Saints Row 2 (2008) as well as resuming the Red Faction series with Red Faction: Guerrilla (2009). Both series were followed by another installment in 2011, Saints Row: The Third and Red Faction: Armageddon, and a horror game project, Insane, was announced in 2010 as the first in a trilogy. Kulas left the company in 2011, later founding Revival Productions with Toschlog in 2014.

In August 2012, THQ cancelled Insane, and in December it filed for bankruptcy. Volition was acquired by Koch Media for US$22 million, and merged with publisher Deep Silver to form Deep Silver Volition, while several franchises, including Summoner and Red Faction, were sold to Nordic Games, which later bought Koch Media in 2018. In late 2022, Nordic's parent company Embracer Group split Volition away from Deep Silver to be a part of an operating group under Gearbox Entertainment, though still an independent studio. Since leaving THQ in 2012 Volition grew to over 200 employees and focused on the Saints Row franchise, producing Saints Row IV (2013), its stand-alone expansion Saints Row: Gat out of Hell (2015), and the franchise reboot Saints Row (2022). It additionally developed Agents of Mayhem (2017), a superhero-themed action-adventure game connected to the Saints Row franchise. In June 2023, Embracer, following the collapse of a multi-billion dollar deal, announced wide-ranging plans to restructure the company that would include studio closures and staff layoffs; Volition was shut down on August 31, 2023. In nearly 30 years of operation, Volition developed 18 titles, as well as at least 6 titles that were cancelled while in development.

== Games ==
=== As Parallax Software ===
Game	Details
Descent Original release date: March 5, 1995	Release years by system: 1995 – MS-DOS, Mac OS; 1996 – PlayStation; 1998 – Acorn Archimedes
Descent Original release date: March 5, 1995	Notes: First-person shooter game, shoot 'em up game; Published by Interplay Entertainment; Part of the Descent series; Expansion pack Descent: Levels of the World (1995) contains 99 level submissions from a design competition and one level from Parallax Software; Descent: Anniversary Edition (1996) includes original game, Levels of the World, and twenty additional levels; Original game and Levels of the World included in Descent I and II: The Definitive Collection (1997) compilation; Sega Saturn version announced for release in December 1995, but canceled; Nintendo 64 version announced for release in 1997 as Ultra Descent, but canceled; Source code released in 1997, leading to unofficial mods and ports
Descent II Original release date: March 13, 1996	Release years by system: 1996 – MS-DOS, Mac OS, Windows (The Infinite Abyss / Destination Quartzon); 1997 – PlayStation (Descent Maximum); 2001 – Acorn Archimedes
Descent II Original release date: March 13, 1996	Notes: First-person shooter game, shoot 'em up game; Published by Interplay Entertainment; Part of the Descent series; Sequel to Descent; created as an expansion to the original game; Version titled Descent II: Destination Quartzon (1996) included as tie-in game with hardware products; Expansion pack Descent II: Vertigo Series (1996) contains additional levels and map builder; Descent II: The Infinite Abyss (1996) release for Windows includes original game and Vertigo Series; Released on PlayStation as Descent Maximum; Original game and Vertigo Series included in Descent I and II: The Definitive Collection (1997) compilation; Source code released in 1998, leading to unofficial mods and ports.

=== As Volition ===
Game	Details
Descent: FreeSpace – The Great War Original release date: March 19, 1998	Release years by system: 1998 – Windows; 2001 – Amiga (FreeSpace: The Great War)
Descent: FreeSpace – The Great War Original release date: March 19, 1998	Notes: Space combat simulator game; Published by Interplay Entertainment; Part of the Descent series; Expansion pack Descent: FreeSpace – Silent Threat (1998) developed by Volition and published by Interplay; Original game and Silent Threat included in Descent: FreeSpace – Battle Pack (1998) and Descent: FreeSpace – The Great War/Silent Threat (2001) compilation releases
FreeSpace 2 Original release date: September 30, 1999	Release years by system: 1999 – Windows
FreeSpace 2 Original release date: September 30, 1999	Notes: Space combat simulator; Published by Interplay Entertainment; Part of the Descent series; Sequel to Descent: FreeSpace – The Great War; FreeSpace 2: Sci-Fi Sim of the Year Edition (2000) includes original game and 20 additional levels; Source code was released in 2002, leading to unofficial mods and ports such as the FreeSpace 2 Source Code Project
Summoner Original release date: October 24, 2000	Release years by system: 2000 – PlayStation 2; 2001 – Windows, macOS
Summoner Original release date: October 24, 2000	Notes: Action role-playing game; Published by THQ
Red Faction Original release date: May 22, 2001	Release years by system: 2001 – PlayStation 2, Windows; 2002 – macOS; 2003 – N-Gage; 2005 – Mobile phones
Red Faction Original release date: May 22, 2001	Notes: First-person shooter game; Published by THQ; Part of the Red Faction series; N-Gage version (2003) developed by Monkeystone Games and published by THQ; Mobile phone version (2005) developed by Blue Beck and published by THQ
Summoner 2 Original release date: September 23, 2002	Release years by system: 2002 – PlayStation 2; 2003 – GameCube
Summoner 2 Original release date: September 23, 2002	Notes: Action role-playing game; Published by THQ; Sequel to Summoner; Gamecube version (2003) developed by Cranky Pants Games and published by THQ
Red Faction II Original release date: October 16, 2002	Release years by system: 2002 – PlayStation 2; 2003 – GameCube, Windows, Xbox
Red Faction II Original release date: October 16, 2002	Notes: First-person shooter game; Published by THQ; Part of the Red Faction series; Sequel to Red Faction; Windows and Xbox versions (2003) developed by Outrage Entertainment and published by THQ; GameCube version developed by Cranky Pants Games and published by THQ
The Punisher Original release date: April 12, 2004	Release years by system: 2004 – Mobile phones 2005 – Xbox, Windows, PlayStation 2
The Punisher Original release date: April 12, 2004	Notes: Third-person shooter game; Published by THQ; Based on the character Punisher by Marvel Comics; Mobile version co-developed with Amplified Games
Saints Row Original release date: August 29, 2006	Release years by system: 2006 – Xbox 360
Saints Row Original release date: August 29, 2006	Notes: Action-adventure game; Published by THQ; Part of the Saints Row series; Several packages of downloadable content (DLC) released; Planned PlayStation 3 version cancelled
Saints Row 2 Original release date: October 14, 2008	Release years by system: 2008 – Xbox 360, PlayStation 3; 2009 – Windows; 2016 – Linux
Saints Row 2 Original release date: October 14, 2008	Notes: Action-adventure game; Published by THQ; Part of the Saints Row series; Sequel to Saints Row
Red Faction: Guerrilla Original release date: June 2, 2009	Release years by system: 2009 – Xbox 360, PlayStation 3, Windows; 2018 – Xbox One, PlayStation 4 (Re-Mars-tered Edition)
Red Faction: Guerrilla Original release date: June 2, 2009	Notes: Third-person shooter game; Published by THQ; Part of the Red Faction series; Sequel to Red Faction II; Three DLC packs released (2009) for Xbox 360 and PlayStation 3, including Demons of the Badlands expansion pack; Re-Mars-tered Edition (2018), a remastered version with improved graphics, released for Windows, PlayStation 4 and Xbox One
Red Faction: Armageddon Original release date: June 7, 2011	Release years by system: 2011 – Xbox 360, PlayStation 3, Windows
Red Faction: Armageddon Original release date: June 7, 2011	Notes: Third-person shooter game; Published by THQ; Part of the Red Faction series; Sequel to Red Faction: Guerrilla
Saints Row: The Third Original release date: November 15, 2011	Release years by system: 2011 – Xbox 360, PlayStation 3, Windows; 2016 – Linux; 2019 – Nintendo Switch (The Full Package); 2020 – Xbox One, PlayStation 4 (remaster)
Saints Row: The Third Original release date: November 15, 2011	Notes: Action-adventure game; Published by THQ; Part of the Saints Row series; Sequel to Saints Row 2; Three DLC packs released—Genkibowl VII, Gangstas In Space, and The Trouble With Clones—as well as smaller DLC content; Saints Row: The Third: The Full Package contains original game and DLC; A remastered version titled Saints Row: The Third Remastered (2020) developed by Sperasoft and published by Deep Silver
Saints Row IV Original release date: August 20, 2013	Release years by system: 2013 – Xbox 360, PlayStation 3, Windows; 2015 – Xbox One, PlayStation 4, Linux (Re-Elected); 2020 – Nintendo Switch (Re-Elected)
Saints Row IV Original release date: August 20, 2013	Notes: Action-adventure game; Published by Deep Silver; Part of the Saints Row series; Sequel to Saints Row: The Third; 2 DLC packs released—Enter the Dominatrix (2013) and How the Saints Save Christmas (2013)—as well as numerous smaller DLC pieces; Saints Row IV: Game of the Century Edition (2014) and Saints Row IV: National Treasure Edition (2014) contain original game and differing amounts of DLC; Saints Row IV: Re-Elected version (2015), co-developed with High Voltage Software, includes all DLC
Saints Row: Gat out of Hell Original release date: January 20, 2015	Release years by system: 2015 – Xbox 360, PlayStation 3, Xbox One, PlayStation 4, Windows, Linux
Saints Row: Gat out of Hell Original release date: January 20, 2015	Notes: Action-adventure game; Co-developed with High Voltage Software; Published by Deep Silver; Part of the Saints Row series; Standalone expansion to Saints Row IV
Agents of Mayhem Original release date: August 15, 2017	Release years by system: 2017 – Xbox One, PlayStation 4, Windows
Agents of Mayhem Original release date: August 15, 2017	Notes: Action-adventure game; Published by Deep Silver
Saints Row Original release date: August 23, 2022	Release years by system: 2022 – Xbox One, Xbox Series X/S, PlayStation 4, PlayStation 5, Windows
Saints Row Original release date: August 23, 2022	Notes: Action-adventure game; Published by Deep Silver; Part of the Saints Row series; Reboot of Saints Row (2006)

=== Canceled ===
Game	Details
Tube Racer Cancellation date: By 1999	Proposed system release: Xbox, PlayStation 2
Tube Racer Cancellation date: By 1999	Notes: Open world action game
Descent 4 Cancellation date: By 2000	Proposed system release: Windows
Descent 4 Cancellation date: By 2000	Notes: First-person shooter game, shoot 'em up game; Part of the Descent series; Intended as a prequel to Descent; Much of the concept material was used in Red Faction
Harry Potter game Cancellation date: By 2001	Proposed system release: N/A
Harry Potter game Cancellation date: By 2001	Notes: Role-playing game; Based on Harry Potter novels; Early prototype pitched before any other games or movies released but not accepted by rights holders; Planned to be published by THQ
Underground Cancellation date: 2003	Proposed system release: Xbox, PlayStation 2
Underground Cancellation date: 2003	Notes: Open world stealth game
Summoner 3 Cancellation date: By 2003	Proposed system release: N/A
Summoner 3 Cancellation date: By 2003	Notes: Action role-playing game
Red Faction 3 Cancellation date: By 2003	Proposed system release: N/A
Red Faction 3 Cancellation date: By 2003	Notes: First-person shooter game
Insane Cancellation date: August 6, 2012	Proposed system release: Xbox 360, PlayStation 3 and Windows
Insane Cancellation date: August 6, 2012	Notes: Horror sandbox game; Announced at the 2010 Spike Video Game Awards on December 11, 2010; Planned to be produced in collaboration with film director Guillermo del Toro; Planned to be published by THQ
