= Babylon Project =

Babylon Project may refer to:

- The Babylon Project, a FreeSpace 2 Source Code Project
- A fictional space station construction program in the Babylon 5 television series
- Project Babylon, an Iraqi weapons program
- A fictional construction project involving the filling in of Tokyo Bay in the Patlabor series
- The Babylon Project, a 2002 foundation established by Alexey Kuzmichev to preserve Iraqi antiquities
- The Babylon Project, a tabletop role-playing game published by Chameleon Eclectic
