= List of Battlestar Galactica video games =

A number of video games have been released based on the various incarnations of the Battlestar Galactica franchise.

== Original series ==
=== "Space Battle" & "Space Attack" ===
Mattel-developed Space Battle for Intellivision and its M-Network counterpart, Space Attack for the Atari VCS/2600 platform, were originally stated to be games based on the Battlestar Galactica series. One of Mattel's subsidiaries, Concepts 2000, had the license to produce Battlestar Galactica electronic toys, so it was figured to be a lock that Mattel would get the license to produce the official Battlestar Galactica video game. The game was well into development when they discovered Mattel didn't get the license. The name was changed, but the graphics remained the same. The "flying saucers" in the game are actually Cylon Raiders; this is mostly imperceptible, due to the lack of detail that could be used in graphics of the platforms of that era. In addition, squadrons of fighters are launched from a "base ship" to defend against the incoming enemy squadrons.

=== Battlestar Galactica (2003) ===
The 2003 Battlestar Galactica mini-series inspired a video game for Sony's PlayStation 2 and Microsoft's Xbox in which the player plays as Commander Adama as a younger man, and flies a number of missions in different craft against Cylon ships, following Adama's career during the First Cylon War. Though presumed set in the continuity of the 2003 reboot, the visuals were based on the designs of the original 1978 series and like the original series, the game featured alien races and their technologies even though no aliens or alien technologies were ever suggested to exist in the 2003 continuity. The game also features the voice talents of Dirk Benedict as Lieutenant Starbuck and Richard Hatch as Captain Apollo, though both characters were hidden content available only through the use of cheat codes and did not feature in the storyline of the main game. It was developed by Warthog Games and it was the last game to be published by Universal Interactive, which dissolved shortly after the game's release.

=== Battlestar Galactica Space Alert ===
In 1976, Mattel released a handheld electronic game called "Missile Attack", which was later resold as "Battlestar Galactica Space Alert" due to difficulties with NBC who refused to air commercials for the Missile Attack game.

=== Others ===
Cylon Attack by A&F Software for the BBC Micro in the 1980s was based on the original series.

The computer game Epic, and its sequel Inferno, released by Ocean software in 1992, featured a similar plot to Battlestar Galactica as well as similar ship models and characters.

== Reimagined series ==
=== Official ===
==== Battlestar Galactica (mobile) ====
Superscape, a mobile phone entertainment company, announced the launch of an action-game based on the series. Through a licensing deal with Universal Studios Consumer Products Group, the Battlestar Galactica mobile phone game is available for download now worldwide for Java enabled handsets. It was released for mobile phones in February 2006. The player starts as a rookie pilot. Players take over the controls of the Colonial Viper Mark VII high performance fighter, and are quickly drawn into the ongoing interstellar war. Fighting their way through 20 levels and a variety of missions, players battle with the deadly Cylons.

==== Battlestar Galactica (2007) ====
A Battlestar Galactica game based on the new series was released for Xbox Live Arcade and Microsoft Windows on October 24, 2007. The game was developed by Sierra/Sierra Online and Auran.

The Xbox Live Arcade Game takes the player through the major fights of the first two seasons of the show as a Viper pilot, it also incorporates multiple achievements and online multiplayer, not to mention unusual abilities Colonial and Cylon fighters possess, such as shielding, stealth, and advanced weapons. According to the review aggregate website Metacritic, the Xbox 360 version received "mixed or average reviews" and the PC version received "generally unfavorable reviews". It has been delisted from Xbox Live Arcade.

==== Battlestar Galactica Online ====
Battlestar Galactica Online was a free-to-play browser-based MMO developed and published by Bigpoint based on the 2003 remake of the television series. Released in open beta on February 8, 2011, BSGO web3D game client was developed atop the Unity Game Development Tool. The game server is written in Erlang. In less than three months of launch, the game surpassed 2 million registered users. On February 1, 2019, Battlestar Galactica Online was discontinued.

Story

Man created the Cylons. The Cylons evolved. The Cylons Rebelled. The game begins 40 years after the first Cylon war. The Cylons paid a visit to the Twelve Colonies to annihilate the humans and take their resources. The aging Battlestar Galactica managed to escape the attack, gather a fleet of civilian ships, and set out for the home of the legendary 13th Colony (Earth). The Cylons pursued Battlestar Galactica for months until Battlestar Galactica reunited with Pegasus, the other survivor from the Cylon attack. Together, they were strong enough to retaliate and destroy the Cylon's Resurrection Ship.

When the Cylons discovered that the humans destroyed the Resurrection Ship, they launched a colossal counter strike against the Colonial Fleet. The unsuspecting Colonials were forced to jump away to safety, but they suffered a mechanical malfunction in the process. A massive pulse of energy overloaded the FTL drives on both fleets, which triggered an uncontrolled jump that threw them off target.

In Battlestar Galactica Online, the Cylons and Colonials are stranded at the edge of one of the galactic arms. Both Colonial fleets are heavily damaged and low on critical resources. The race begins for the Colonials to repair and rearm their ships, escape and continue their quest for Earth before the Cylons gain enough strength to obliterate them once and for all.

==== Battlestar Galactica Deadlock (2017) ====
Battlestar Galactica Deadlock is a 3D strategy game (released on PC, Xbox One and PS4) featuring the First Cylon War. The game is developed by the Australian studio Black Lab Games and published by the British developer Slitherine Software. It was originally announced on May 16, 2017, and it opened its closed beta shortly after.

Battlestar Galactica Deadlock takes the player into the heart of the First Cylon War, to fight 3D battles. The player takes control of the Colonial Fleet from the bridge of the mobile shipyard, Daidalos, and free the Twelve Colonies from the Cylon threat.

Since the release of the game on August 31, 2017, the game has had 4 releases of DLC content to expand the content of the game. The first DLC introduced additional ships and weapons while the remaining three DLCs added additional ships, new locations, terrain, and new story missions that occur during and after the main game.

With the release of the Sin and Sacrifice DLC on March 19, 2019, the creators of Battlestar Galactica Deadlock have announced the end of "Season 1" of the game series and a new DLC titled Battlestar Galactica Deadlock: Resurrection which starts season 2, was released on August 29, 2019. The game has been delisted and taken down since November 15, 2025 preventing future sales.

==== Battlestar Galactica Pinball (2024) ====
Zen Studios released a Battlestar Galactica table for Pinball FX on May 16, 2024 as part of the Universal Pinball: TV Classics pack.

==== Battlestar Galactica: Scattered Hopes (2026) ====
Battlestar Galactica: Scattered Hopes is a tactical roguelite game developed by Alt Shift. The game is a blend of turn-based strategy with fleet management, and pausable real-time tactical combat. The player is put in control of a stranded Colonial gunstar ship in the mission to rejoin the main human fleet.

The game was released on PC on May 11th, 2026.

=== Fan-made games ===
==== BSG: Beyond the Red Line ====
A fan made total conversion for FreeSpace 2 known as Beyond the Red Line had a demo version released on March 31, 2007. A dogfight space combat simulator, the Beyond the Red Line demo allows players to play a tutorial, two missions and multiplayer. Although it's not an official licensed product, it has been featured in multiple publications. It has also been updated to allow third-party campaigns, of which there are currently two.

==== Diaspora ====
A fan game based on the open source FreeSpace 2 engine known as Diaspora began development in May 2008 and was released in September, 2012. It was begun by the majority of the members of the Beyond the Red Line team, who split off due to creative and management differences. (Official Website)

==== Battlestar Galactica in Second life ====
As well with other popular scifi shows, there have been several Battlestar Galactica themed sims (simulators) in Second Life. Many have been centered on the rag-tag fleet theme and usually provide themed events, Viper vs. Raider dogfights, and general combat.

===== Currently active =====
Battlestar: Thesis (BSG-82nd) was created by a new team of BSG fans and running under the fair trade rule set by Universal Studios to use BSG content in Second Life. The story is set in the Second Cylon War but with the idea that the colonies didn't fall but survived, with the goal of expanding the BSG universe. The ships and fighters are based on the RDM Series all Mesh build and the sim features the colonial 82nd Recon Fleet consisting of the Battlestar Thesis, Stealth Gunstar Aeon, Heavy Gunstar Cerberus, Support Gunstar Sirius. The Cylon fleet contains the Warstar Cylonica, Strikestar Regen, Strikestar Relic, Cylonbase and Djerba Outpost. BSG 82 RP Sim has a promotional video to show what the sim offers. The sim started in 2011 and is still open today. It is called Sniper Eye: Battlestar Thesis.

===== Closed / inactive =====
Until December, 2010, there were several active sims based on the Re-imagined Series, with several more under development. These were:

Battlestar Pacifica (BSG-47): The Columbia Class Pacifica was the first of the sims based on the series. It opened in 2007 and was the oldest of the sims that were active as of December, 2010. The Sim restarted their story, having completed their storyline in December 2009. The sim featured a number of ships seen in both series, including a version of the Celestra. As of August 2012, this sim is closed.

Battlestar Mercury (BSG-21): In May 2008, The Battlestar Mercury sim opened and was created by former members of the Pacifica sim. The Mercury, a Mercury Class Battlestar similar to the Pegasus, featured the signature double sided landing decks, which allowed participating residents to land their ship upside down. In January 2010, the Mercury concluded their first story and following a restructure of their leadership, began a new story, this one centered on an original story concept inspired by a prop painting that hung in Commander Adama's quarters. However, as of January, 2011, the second story line was suspended and scrapped due to the situation with NBCUniversal (see below) and began their third story. Like their predecessor, the Mercury sim also featured ships from the Reimagined series, including a version of the Zephyr. As of August 2012, this sim was closed, however, in December 2012, the owners of the sim announced a new, unique version of the Galactica Story called Battlestar Mercury: New Genesis. the story, set 150,000 years after the end of the reimagined series, on modern day Earth, combines elements of the Galactica story and a Hunger Games-style environment that promises to take the story into a new direction unique to the genre. On November 5, 2014, the owners of the Mercury sim, citing the ongoing erosion of interest in the genre, announced the sim's impending closure after six years of existence (Official Website) One of the owners of the BSG-21 sim, Shmuel Bogomolny has written a fan fiction story based loosely on the story of the sim. Bogomolny has been using recorded footage from the Battlestar Galactica Deadlock game to bring the combat sequences to live. There has been a recent increase in updates to https://battlestarmercury.com . The story has 40 chapters and has integrated an alternate storyline based on the premise that CNP would not have been installed throughout the Colonial Fleet without basic information technology vetting such as a code review or a penetration test. This story is developing toward a small portion of the fleet surviving the attacks and struggling to gather refugees and strike back at the Cylons.

Battlestar Universe (BSG-33): Currently inactive. In September 2009, the Columbia Class Battlestar Olympia opened their story. Unlike their predecessors, The Olympia sim was set during the first Cylon War. Several months ago, Battlestar Universe closed their doors and the sim on which play occurred was sold. In early 2011 former owners of the original BSG-33 attempted to revive their project with a slightly changed concept on a homestead instead of a full sim. As of August 2012, this sim is closed.

Battlestar: The Twelve Colonies (BSG-118): In January 2010, this particular BSG sim opened featuring a pre-Cylon attack cityscape as well as a new, non-canon class of Battlestar, the Phoenix. This particular sim differed from others in that when the Cylon attacks occur, the Twelve Colonies were not completely lost, resulting in expanded roleplay potential located on the various Colonies themselves. Set partially in Caprica City, the city contained familiar sets from the series, including the Riverwalk Market and other notable landmarks. This sim closed after Universal Studios' actions against Battlestar Galactica themes in Second Life, but as of August 2012, part of its former administrative team is now working on a new project called Battlestar: Resurrection.

BSG: Exodus (BSG-104): Following a new concept and original story using the re-imagined series as a backdrop, this sim began construction when disputes over owner conduct, fragmented the BSG47 sim for the third time. This sim closed in mid-2012 for reasons unrelated to NBCUniversal's DMCA against Battlestar Galactica intellectual property in Second Life.

===== NBCUniversal controversy =====
Although the number of sims have paled in comparison to the Star Trek and Star Wars sims in Second Life, there has been a very dedicated following amongst them. However, in July 2010, NBCUniversal began efforts to have the sims removed from Second Life by claiming an intellectual property infringement by both individual creators and Linden Labs for hosting such work. The initial campaign moved to stop the sale of items such as flyable ships and uniforms from the series made available to residents of second life by a number of vendors, not necessarily related to the sims. Despite the efforts of the various BSG themed sims, Universal began demands that the sims cease and desist using their trademarked images and content in their role-play sims. By December 7, 2010, the majority of the sims had either shut down or changed their content and storylines away from that in the series.

Exodus, a newcomer in the BSG fan roleplay world staffed by longtime members of the community, took up the cause and recruited Anthony Hasledge of the 'IFT Sci-Fi Alliance', to open dialogue with licensing executives and resolve the trademark issue. Other former and current BSG sim owners joined the effort, as did players from every quarter of the BSG roleplay community. Their efforts were successful and, so long as the BSG sims in Second Life comply with a set of rules including no sale of any products related to BSG, they are allowed to continue. As of February 5, 2011, Universal has allowed fair-use of intellectual property related to Battlestar Galactica.

In April, 2011, an announcement was released that the Exodus and Twelve Colonies, who had changed their name to the Tocana Colonies after the controversy, had agreed to a merger that would take place as of April 8, 2011. However, it was later revealed to be an April Fool's Day Hoax.

=== Fan-made game mods ===
Game modifications of various games have been made.

==== BSG: Fleet Commander ====
Battlestar Galactica: Fleet Commander is a Homeworld 2 total conversion. Beta versions of BSG: Fleet Commander are available for Windows and the Macintosh. This is a real-time strategy game in which players command human or Cylon fleets from both the original series and the 2003 reimagined version of the series. It has been mentioned by many gaming publications. Sensretractor, a development team member, has mentioned the work on a Blood and Chrome release. Following the fallout of the NBC cease and desist given to the BSG Nexus mod, further work by the original team on the HWBSG mod was halted when the mod admin and founder retired from the project fearing they too would receive a cease and desist.

The mod has since been revived by Phoenix Interactive building upon the work of the original team to create a high definition version for the Homeworld 2 re-release.

==== BSG: Edge Of Apocalypse ====
Battlestar Galactica: Edge Of Apocalypse, before version 2.0 known as Battlestar Galactica: Dawn Of War is a modification for Freelancer. The first version was released in March 2007 and it has since been frequently updated. The game allows players to pilot colonial or cylon fighters, transport and battleships and engage in space combat, trading or deep space exploration in an attempt to find Earth.

==== BSG – Colonial Wars ====
Battlestar Galactica – Colonial Wars is a Star Wars: Empire at War: Forces of Corruption modification. It was featured as the 'Mod of the Month' in the May 2008 issue of PC Gamer. The mod development was finished at version 5.0, as only a semi-conversion; large chunks of Star Wars content remained. Development then focused on a follow-up project, which was set to be a larger, total conversion mod. The mod is set to be completed under a new name, Battlestar Galactica: At War. This uses the same concept for the game, and is set to totally convert Star Wars: Empire at War into Battlestar Galactica. Sadly this mod ceased development and is no longer available. A new sub mod has started up using assets from the Colonial wars mod titled "Battlestar Galactica: War of the Colonies". This aims to totally convert the game based around an alternate storyline where the Cylon virus does not work, leading to an all out conventional war between the two sides.

==== Other ====
There are also Battlestar Galactica fan modifications of the games Battlefield 1942, Battlefield 2, Battlefield 2142, Homeworld, Star Trek: Armada II, Star Trek: Bridge Commander, GTA: San Andreas, Warcraft III: The Frozen Throne, Sins of a Solar Empire, Nexus: The Jupiter Incident and X3: Reunion, as well as add-ons for the Orbiter Space Flight Simulator.
