= Wing Commander Saga: The Darkest Dawn =

2012 video game

- Series: Wing Commander
- Engine: FS2 Open
- Platform: Windows
- Release: 22 March 2012
- Genre: Space combat simulation
- Mode: Single-player

Wing Commander Saga: The Darkest Dawn is a freeware Windows game, released on 22 March 2012, made by fans of the Wing Commander series.

== Plot ==
The game depicts a war between Terran Confederation and the Kilrathi Empire. The story runs parallel to the events of Wing Commander III: Heart of the Tiger. The player is a rookie pilot with a call sign "The Sandman", currently serving on TCS Hermes. The game features a 55-mission campaign.

== Development and release ==
In the early 2000s, Wing Commander Saga was proposed as a mod for Conquest: Frontier Wars, Homeworld, and Starshatter until it was decided to be made with the FreeSpace 2 engine. The game's prologue was released separately on 31 December 2006. The full game was released 22 March 2012. A mission editor was released on 11 April 2012.

== Reception ==
Reception

Review scores
Publication	Score
4Players	Good
Eurogamer.it	8/10
PC Action	Very good

Rock Paper Shotgun wrote: "It's a terrific fan-game, and a much needed return to a genre that's been sitting with adventure games in the commercial sin-bin for far, far too long." PC Games Hardware called it a worthy remake with a gripping story. Eurogamer.de called the game a small masterpiece. HotHardware wrote: "[...] it pays homage to its source material while improving on Wing Commander's classic gameplay and graphics." Atomic said: "If you remember or are a fan of the classic series this is a must-have to download and play. If you’re not familiar with the series but love Battlestar Galactica, this is also a must-have to download and play." PC Games said The Darkest Dawn comes close to the quality of FreeSpace 2 and is simply impressive for a fan project. Joker said the game has an authentic atmosphere and excellent missions. Joystick described it as one of the most ambitious amateur projects ever completed. GameStar said the game is tactical-oriented, like Star Wars: TIE Fighter (1994) rather than the more action-packed Wing Commander III.
