= FreeSpace 2 Source Code Project =

Open source video game engine

- In-game recreation of the box cover art of FreeSpace 2 retail
- Original author: Volition, Inc.
- Developer: FreeSpace 2 Source Code Project
- Initial release: 2002; 23 years ago
- Stable release: 24.2.0 / October 27, 2024; 11 months ago
- Repository: github.com/scp-fs2open/fs2open.github.com
- Written in: C++
- Engine: Descent: FreeSpace – The Great War
- Operating system: Windows, Mac OS X, Linux, FreeBSD
- Type: Space combat simulator
- License: Freeware for non-commercial use
- Website: scp.indiegames.us

The FreeSpace 2 Source Code Project is the project of a group of programmers maintaining and enhancing the game engine for the space combat simulator FreeSpace 2, developed by Volition. The source code was released in 2002, and is used by several projects. Most prominent among these are games based on the Babylon 5 and 2004 Battlestar Galactica universes.

== History ==
Volition, the company responsible for developing the game FreeSpace 2 was bought by THQ in 2000. With Interplay Entertainment holding the licenses for the FreeSpace series, Volition could not continue to develop the series. Without any viable use for the source code, Volition's Dave Baranec released the source code for FreeSpace 2's game engine on 25 April 2002. This allowed modders the possibility of modifying the game engine almost without limitations. However, because the source code is under a noncommercial license, it does not qualify as free and open source software.

To prevent a plethora of different versions of the game from appearing, a single "umbrella" project (with the unified goal of enhancing the game) under the name FreeSpace 2 Source Code Project was formed. Initially led by Edward "Inquisitor" Gardner, the team is currently led by Tyler "DahBlount" Blount. Previous leaders also include Ian "Goober5000" Warfield, Taylor Richards, Cliff "Chief1983" Gordon and Fabian "The E" Woltermann.

In addition, content update packs have been developed which take advantage of the upgraded game engine. These packs include higher-poly models and higher resolution textures. The end result of this project is to create a graphically superior (and far more flexible) game engine, while still retaining all of the gameplay elements that made FreeSpace 2 successful.

== Notable projects ==
The primary project FS2 Open takes advantage of the upgraded engine for FreeSpace 2. Most of the other projects are based on science-fiction television shows or movies. Diaspora: Shattered Armistice and the presumed-defunct Beyond the Red Line each tell a side story based on the humans and robotic Cylons of the 2004 Battlestar Galactica television series. Another science fiction television series based project is The Babylon Project, based on the critically acclaimed Babylon 5. All three of these projects are implementing their own Newtonian flight physics. The demo of The Babylon Project was downloaded 100,000 times within two weeks of its announcement, and was reported on Apple.com and in France's Joystick game magazine.

There are several projects to recreate established video games using the FS2 Open engine. These include Star Fox: Event Horizon for the Star Fox universe, and Wing Commander Saga for the Wing Commander universe.

Some notable original mods and campaigns have been created, such as Wings of Dawn which takes place in an anime-style world, and Blue Planet which offers a continuation of FreeSpace 2, telling of a civil war between Earth and the GTVA. The FreeSpace Port, sometimes called FSPort, ports the original Descent: FreeSpace – The Great War to the FreeSpace 2 and SCP engine with many graphical enhancements, and serves as a base for many mods set in the FreeSpace: Great War era, such as Shrouding the Light and Awakenings. Silent Threat: Reborn similarly ports the Silent Threat expansion for Descent: FreeSpace into the FreeSpace 2 SCP engine.

== See also ==
- Descent: FreeSpace – The Great War
- Vega Strike
