= Summoner (video game) =

2000 video game

- North American PC box art for Summoner
- Developer: Volition
- Publisher: THQ
- Designer: Sandeep Shekhar
- Programmers: Mark Allender; James Hague
- Artist: Adam Pletcher
- Writers: Jason Scott; Michael Breault
- Composers: Scott Lee; Dan Wentz; Walter Shaw
- Platforms: PlayStation 2 Microsoft Windows; Mac OS
- Release: PlayStation 2: NA: October 26, 2000; EU: April 6, 2001; AU: April 2001; Windows: NA: March 20, 2001; EU: April 26, 2002; Mac OS: NA: June 20, 2001
- Genre: Action role-playing
- Modes: Single-player, multiplayer

Summoner is a 2000 action role-playing game developed by Volition and published by THQ for the PlayStation 2. It was released as a launch title for the console and was subsequently ported to Microsoft Windows and Mac OS the following year. In the game, the player plays the role of Joseph and can assemble a team of compatriots and summon powerful monsters. The game has a world map, involved storyline, and unique hybrid combat system involving real-time and turn-based mechanisms.

A sequel, Summoner 2, was released in 2002. After the bankruptcy of publisher THQ in December 2012, the Summoner franchise was acquired by Nordic Games, now THQ Nordic, who released the PlayStation 2 version of the first game on the PlayStation 4 and PlayStation 5 in July 2024.

== Gameplay ==
In addition to the main storyline, there are over twenty side quests that may be completed. Summoner's combat system is a hybrid system incorporating real-time and turn-based combat, with characters essentially "taking turns" to attack during real-time gameplay. Included within this system is a unique "Chain attack" mechanic, in which players can extend their "turn" by performing special melee attacks at the appropriate time. If done correctly, players can "chain" these special attacks into long sequences, inflicting far greater amounts of damage than they might otherwise have. These special attacks can also have special effects such as inflicting status effects, damaging an enemy's action points or inflicting more health damage than normal. Characters can also acquire and use a variety of special abilities and spells, expending "action points" in order to use these abilities. The game's Summoning mechanic allows the player to conjure monsters that will serve as additional party members, allowing the player to have a 5-character party instead of a 4-character party. These monsters have their own spells and abilities that they bring into combat, but will go rogue and attack the player's party if Joseph is defeated in combat.

== Plot ==
The player takes on the role of Joseph and his party of three other individuals: Flece (a professional bandit), Rosalind (a monk in training), and Jekhar (a knight of Lenele's king). Joseph is an ordinary peasant farmer who is also born a Summoner who can control the rings of Summoning. In his childhood, he had summoned a demon to kill off a warding invasion from Orenian soldiers. To his dismay, his demon not only kill the invaders, but also his family, and other members of his village. During this time, he was under the guidance of Yago, a monk who hailed from a sacred island called Iona. He vowed to never use the rings again, until his present situation required it. Joseph attempts to meet Yago at the kingdom of Lenele, where he meets his first companion, Flece. She helps Joseph infiltrate the castle, where they both meet Yago. Yago returns Joseph the Ring of Darkness, the same ring that Joseph used back when he was a child. Yago informs Joseph and Flece that their enemy is Murod of Orenia, who is determined to destroy the Summoner and prevent a prophecy that foretells the end of the Emperor's reign by his hands. The characters must also simultaneously attempt to restore the power of the air god, Urath, and foil the depravations of the disciples of his fire and death goddess nemesis, Laharah.

== Development ==
Summoner was developed by twenty-three people.

== Music ==
Scott Lee was the main composer and senior sound designer of Summoner and did most of the game music with Dan Wentz helping on the soundtrack towards the end of development near gold master. Wally Shaw did sound design and some editing of music towards the middle of development. After interplay went bankrupt, Lee provided the first tech demonstration for THQ. During this time Lee and Wentz also worked on the early Descent 4 trailer music, which later rebranded into Red Faction for legal reasons and FreeSpace 2.

== Reception ==
Reception

Aggregate score
Aggregator	Score	
Aggregator	PC	PS2
Metacritic	78/100	74/100

Review scores
Publication	Score	
Publication	PC	PS2
CNET Gamecenter	N/A	5/10
Computer Gaming World	4/5	N/A
Edge	N/A	4/10
Electronic Gaming Monthly	N/A	4.83/10 (Note: Three critics of Electronic Gaming Monthly gave the PlayStation 2 version each a score of 6/10, 4/10, and 4.5/10.)
EP Daily	N/A	8/10
Eurogamer	N/A	8/10
Game Informer	N/A	8/10
GameRevolution	N/A	C−
GameSpot	7.6/10	7.7/10
GameSpy	82%	78%
IGN	7.6/10	8.3/10
Next Generation	N/A	2/5
Official U.S. PlayStation Magazine	N/A	3/5
PC Gamer (US)	81%	N/A

The PC version received "generally favorable reviews", while the PlayStation 2 version received "average" reviews, according to the review aggregation website Metacritic. Blake Fischer of NextGen said that the problem of the latter version "is that it was clearly shoved out the door prematurely, and doing so has all but killed this promising RPG." Uncle Dust of GamePro called the same console version "a good start for PS2 RPGs, but lacks the polish, artistry, and refined story line of some recent PlayStation RPGs. It delivers a deep story, however, and a unique game engine, and should give you weeks, if not months, of adventuring on your brand-new PS2." (Note: GamePro gave the PlayStation 2 version two 4.5/5 scores for graphics and sound, 3.5/5 for control, and 4/5 for fun factor.)

Jason White of AllGame gave the original PlayStation 2 version three stars out of five, saying, "In the end, Summoner is a decent first effort on the part of Volition. It looks beautiful, contains many hours of gameplay, and can be fun. Is it one of the top role-playing games available for home consoles? Hardly, but those hungry for an RPG on their PlayStation 2 should be able to live with the faults." Christopher Allen later gave the PC version three-and-a-half stars, saying, "As a complete package, Summoner is playable and a better than average addition to the RPG genre. The particle effects for the spells and treatment of the landscapes are well done, but graphics alone don't make the game. A lethargic storyline and cast of 2D characters becomes slightly tiresome and players are not compelled to advance to the next chapter. The game admirably attempts to overcome these challenges, but in the end simply isn't engaging enough for all but the most dedicated gamers. The groundwork was laid for a unique experience, but Summoner fails to clear its self-imposed bar." David Ryan Hunt of Computer Games Strategy Plus gave the same PC version a similar score of three-and-a-half stars, saying, "With a strong plot, good multiplayer, lots of items to find, things to do and places to explore, Summoner provides an acceptably entertaining experience, but it lacks anything truly original that might elevate it into the realms of a truly memorable game. As a final note, it has a rather... ah, interesting... pen and paper RPG script after the credits. You have to see it to understand."

The PlayStation 2 version won the award for "Best Story" at GameSpot's Best and Worst of 2000 Awards. The PC version was later nominated for the "Best Single-Player Role-Playing Game" and "Best Story" awards at the website's Best and Worst of 2001 Awards, but lost to Wizardry 8 and Anachronox, respectively. The former console version also won the awards for Role-Playing Game of 2000 and Storyline of 2000 at IGN's Best of 2000 Awards.

According to PC Data, Summoner sold 120,000 units in 2000 for the PlayStation 2.

== Sequel ==
A sequel, Summoner 2, was released in 2002.

On December 19, 2012, THQ filed for Chapter 11 Bankruptcy and its properties were auctioned off in individual lots. The Summoner franchise, among other THQ properties including Darksiders and Red Faction, was sold to Nordic Games. Nordic Games have subsequently re-branded and published Summoner to the Steam digital distribution platform.

== See also ==
- Dead Alewives#Dungeons and Dragons sketch, a comedy sketch, also known as "Summoner Geeks". It is available in the game's credits
