= Saints Row: The Third downloadable content =

Downloadable content for a video game

Promotional wallpaper image depicting the major themes of the downloadable content packs

Downloadable content for Saints Row: The Third was announced before the game's November 2011 release along with a commitment from publisher THQ to support 40 weeks of content. Among smaller upgrades, three main content packs were released: Genkibowl VII, Gangstas in Space, and The Trouble with Clones. Reviewers found all three packs short—around an hour in length—and considered The Trouble with Clones the best of the bunch.

Genkibowl VII, released in January 2012, brought four new activity types to Steelport around a Professor Genki-themed competition. Sad Panda Skyblazing, the only one of the four activities to not modify an existing activity type, was the reviewers' favorite. Gangstas in Space, released in February, is a three-mission story about a Saints-themed film production starring the player and fighting aliens. The Trouble with Clones, released in March, has the player tracking down and quelling a rampant clone of Saints leader Johnny Gat. Reviewers highly praised its "Saints Flow" superpower sequences, and questioned why they could not have been unlocked in the main game afterwards. All download packs offered unlocks upon their completion.

The Full Package, a version containing all of the game's downloadable content on disc alongside the main game, was released in November. Some of the smaller content items include costume, vehicle, and ability unlocks. THQ planned a standalone expansion of the game called Enter the Dominatrix. It was originally an April Fools' Day prank, that would be spun into Saints Row IV's downloadable content.

== The Full Package ==
Downloadable content for Saints Row: The Third was announced before the game's release, and has included additional story missions, weapons, and characters. The game's publisher, THQ, pledged "40 weeks" of downloadable content following the game's launch on November 15, 2011. A season pass offered a discount on the total cost of three downloadable content packs—Genkibowl VII, Gangstas in Space, and The Trouble with Clones—all scheduled for release by Q2 2012, and added the Nyte Blade vampire hunter content as a bonus.

A full release containing all downloadable content with the original game, Saints Row: The Third – The Full Package, was announced in September 2012 for release two months later on PC, PlayStation 3, and Xbox 360. The package included all three mission packs ("Genkibowl VII", "Gangstas in Space", and "The Trouble with Clones") as well as the add-on clothes, vehicles, and weapons. It was released on November 6, 2012 in North America, and ten days later internationally.

THQ announced an Enter the Dominatrix standalone expansion to the game as an April Fools' Day prank in 2012. It was confirmed as in development the next month. In Enter the Dominatrix, the alien commander Zinyak imprisons the Saints' leader in a simulation of Steelport called The Dominatrix so as to prevent interference when he takes over the planet. The expansion also added superpowers for the player-character. In June, THQ said the expansion would be wrapped into a full sequel, tentatively titled "The Next Great Sequel in the Saints Row Franchise" and scheduled for a 2013 release. Parts of Enter the Dominatrix that weren't incorporated into the sequel, Saints Row IV, were later released as Enter the Dominatrix downloadable content for the new title.

== Genkibowl VII ==
Genkibowl VII was the first downloadable mission pack of three to be released for Saints Row: The Third. The pack is structured around a contest with four different activities structured around a Professor Genki theme. Genki is a "homicidal man-cat" whose Super Ethical Reality Climax competitions are popular in Steelport, and the leader of the Saints is invited to participate in his annual Genkibowl. Zach and Bobby, the commentators associated with Professor Genki's shows, return to cover the competition with Tammy Tolliver.

Three of the four activities are "revamped versions" of other activities from the main game. Genki Apocalypse is a shooting minigame similar to the main game's Super Ethical Reality Climax, where the player travels through rooms shooting enemies and targets (such as Ethical and Money Shot targets) to earn money. Accidentally shooting the Sad Panda targets reduces the player's earnings. Unlike Super Ethical Reality Climax, Genki Apocalypse has a jungle theme, including shark-infested waters. The second activity, Super Ethical PR Opportunity, is based on the main game's Escort minigames, but the player instead escorts Professor Genki himself. The Genki Mobile car features flamethrowers around its periphery, for when Genki demands carnage en route. The car is unlocked upon finishing the activity. The third activity, Sexy Kitten Yarngasm, is a cross between the main game's Tank Mayhem activity and the Katamari series where the player rolls a destructive ball of yarn around the streets. The player must destroy a certain amount of property within a time limit. Upon completing the activity, the player unlocks Yarnie (the ball of yarn) as a vehicle. In the last activity, the new Sad Panda Skyblazing, the player dons a Sad Panda costume and jumps from a helicopter, falling through fire rings into Ethical balloons and onto rooftops to kill costumed mascots with a chainsaw. There are two instances of each activity on the map, and finishing each activity unlocks new costumes, support characters, and vehicles. The pack was released three months following the game, on January 17, 2012.

=== Reception ===
Genkibowl VII reviews

Aggregate score
Aggregator	Score
Metacritic	PS3: 64/100 (5 critics); X360: 49/100 (11 critics)

Review scores
Publication	Score
GameSpot	5/10
GameZone	7.0/10
Official Xbox Magazine (US)	5.0/10

Genkibowl VII received "generally unfavorable" and "mixed" reviews for its Xbox 360 and PlayStation versions, respectively, according to video game review score aggregator Metacritic. Reviewers complained that the pack was too short, with GameZone's David Sanchez and GameSpot's Carolyn Petit finishing it in under an hour. Official Xbox Magazine's Francesca Reyes called it "crazy short". Reviewers thought the new activity, Sad Panda Skyblazing, was the highlight of the pack, though Game Informer's Dan Ryckert thought it was "the most annoying of them all". Critics were dissatisfied by the amount of recycled content.

GameZone's Sanchez thought that the activities were "crazy" and "fun". He considered Super Ethical Reality Climax among the best activities in the main game, and was not surprised that Genki Apocalypse was "the most enjoyable" in the pack. Sanchez was frustrated by the charging enemies in Super Ethical PR Opportunity, and thought Sad Panda Skyblazing was the "craziest" and "most unique" of the four activities, fitting in with Saints Row: The Third's "insane nature". He did not feel that the game needed to be included in the original release, but thought there should have been at least five different opportunities to do each new activity. Similarly, Petit of GameSpot also thought only Sad Panda Skyblazing matched the main game in "zaniness", and said the pack felt "mundane" overall. She said that the story is more minor in the pack and that it was less funny than the main game. Petit was frustrated by the labyrinth-like design of some of the Genki Apocalypse levels, and was uninterested in Super Ethical PR Opportunity by the time the activity ended. Rock Paper Shotgun's John Walker wanted something more expansive for the first pack, and expected something more original and strange along the lines of Saints Row 2's "shit spraying" activity. UGO's Paul Furfari wrote that the lack of content is less disappointing if the player thinks of Genkibowl as "a small booster pack".

== Gangstas in Space ==
A month later, Gangstas in Space was released. In three missions, players continue the Saints Row: The Third story in a new arc about the Gangstas in Space film referenced in the main story. In the game, the film about the Saints is being directed by the self-interested Hollywood director Andy Zhen and the player is acting the final scenes of the film alongside a female co-star making her debut. In the first level, the player fights the military to save a female alien and controls the turret on the getaway vehicle. In the second, the player is in a shootout in a linear map. The last mission has the player in an aircraft fighting other aircraft while the co-star uploads viruses to transmitters. At the time of review, the player could not revisit the old missions to earn missed achievements, but was later patched. Costumes and vehicles are unlocked upon completing the pack. The pack was released in North America on February 21, 2012, and in Europe the next day.

=== Reception ===
Gangstas in Space reviews

Aggregate score
Aggregator	Score
Metacritic	X360: 73/100 (5 critics)

Review scores
Publication	Score
GameZone	7.5/10
Official Xbox Magazine (US)	7.5/10

Gangstas in Space received "mixed or average" reviews, according to video game review score aggregator Metacritic. Reviewers found the pack similar in length to its predecessor.

GameZone's David Sanchez thought the quality was much better than the previous pack and that the missions were "lengthy", but still felt the game was still too short—an hour in duration. Official Xbox Magazine's Josh Abrams wrote that the pack had the "foul language, cool set-pieces, and satirical worldview" of the main game and an exploitation feel, which he appreciated. Dan Ryckert of Game Informer called the story minimal and said that the pack's only difference from the game was the alien skins atop the main game's weapons and vehicles. He added that if they did not have the skins, the missions would "easily be some of the most uneventful in the game". Overall, Ryckert was disappointed with the first two content packs. Andrew Smee of Rock, Paper, Shotgun thought Gangstas in Space was the better of the final two packs, and praised the game's humorous voice acting as "the best since ... Psychonauts". He also found the cutscenes "fantastic" in comparison to BioWare's Mass Effect 3 scenes.

== The Trouble with Clones ==
When Saints member Johnny Gat died, Saints fan and stereotypical nerd Jimmy Torbitson cloned him, beginning a three-mission series on capturing and quelling the superpowered clone, who acts like the "brute" enemy type in the main game. Torbitson narrates the missions like a superhero film. The first mission has the player fighting off enemy gangs and police, and the second involves a ploy to calm Gat with music while Torbitson dancing to distract Saints fans and the player tranquilizes the fans with a bee gun. In the final mission, the player drinks Torbitson's Saints Flow, granting superpowers such as speed, strength, and fireballs, and the player protects the clone Johnny Tag on a bridge from a military onslaught. Upon completion, the player unlocks two computer-controlled homies for support and a vehicle. The missions can be replayed. The pack was released March 20, 2012, halfway through THQ's promised 40 weeks of additional content.

=== Reception ===
The Trouble with Clones reviews

Review scores
Publication	Score
GameZone	8.0/10
Official Xbox Magazine (US)	8.5/10

Similar to the other packs, The Trouble with Clones contained about an hour of gameplay. Reviewers thought the pack was the best of the set, and praised the Saints Flow superpowers sequence. Multiple reviewers questioned why the bee gun and superpowers were not unlocked in the main game.

Game Informer's Dan Ryckert said he found sprinting with Saints Flow to be preferable to driving, and that portion to be "a lot of fun". He was disappointed when the powers and "bee gun" did not unlock in the main game. Official Xbox Magazine's Josh Abrams compared the pack to a 1980s film with Torbitson's narration and praised both the part where a female brute attracts Gat, and the Saints Flow superpower sequence. He lamented not being able to export the powers back into the main game. GameZone's David Sanchez called the bee gun "a great deal of fun", but praised the final mission "freaking awesome" as "bleeding the madness that made so many gamers fall in love with Saints Row: The Third in the first place."

== Other content ==
- The Nyte Blade pack includes a vampire hunter-themed sports car and motorcycle, and altar boy and "bloody canoness" costumes.
- The Explosive Combat pack adds a "future soldier" costume and M2 grenade launcher, while the Z Style pack adds a "Z-style" suit and bling shotgun.
- The Warrior pack adds four Kabuki costumes. The Bloodsucker pack adds an ability to regenerate health by sucking the blood of non-playable characters, as well other ability upgrades.
- The free CheapyD Homie pack adds computer-controlled support with a character modeled on CheapyD of Cheap Ass Gamer. He felt honored to be included, even if he "bought [his] way in".
- A free pack featured giant heads of Team Fortress 2 characters were released for Steam players on January 17, 2012.
- A Penthouse pack includes support characters modeled on pornographic actresses Nikki Benz, Justine Joli, Ryan Keely, and Heather Vandeven.
