= Saints Row: The Third =

2011 action-adventure game

- Developer: Volition (Note: Fishlabs developed the Nintendo Switch port, Sperasoft developed Saints Row: The Third Remastered.)
- Publisher: THQ (Note: Deep Silver published the Nintendo Switch port and Saints Row: The Third Remastered.)
- Director: Scott Phillips
- Producer: Greg Donovan
- Designer: Bryan Dillow
- Programmer: Nick Lee
- Artist: Frank Marquart
- Writer: Steve Jaros
- Composer: Malcolm Kirby Jr.
- Series: Saints Row
- Platforms: Original; PlayStation 3; Xbox 360; Microsoft Windows; Linux; Nintendo Switch; Remastered; PlayStation 4; Windows; Xbox One; Stadia; PlayStation 5; Xbox Series X/S; Android; iOS
- Release: PS3, X360, Windows: NA: November 15, 2011; AU: November 15, 2011; EU: November 18, 2011; Linux: WW: April 15, 2016; Nintendo Switch: WW: May 10, 2019; Remastered; PlayStation 4, Windows, Xbox One: WW: May 22, 2020; Google Stadia: WW: March 5, 2021; PlayStation 5, Xbox Series X/S: WW: May 25, 2021; Amazon Luna: US: July 29, 2021; Android, iOS: WW: October 29, 2026
- Genre: Action-adventure
- Modes: Single-player, multiplayer

Saints Row: The Third is a 2011 action-adventure game developed by Volition and published by THQ. It is the sequel to 2008's Saints Row 2 and the third installment in the Saints Row series. It was released on November 15, 2011, for Microsoft Windows, PlayStation 3, and Xbox 360, and May 10, 2019, for the Nintendo Switch. A remastered version of the game, titled Saints Row: The Third Remastered, was released by Deep Silver on May 22, 2020, for the PlayStation 4, Windows, and Xbox One, March 5, 2021, for Stadia, May 25, 2021, for the PlayStation 5 and Xbox Series X/S, and July 29, 2021, for Luna. An Android and iOS port of the remastered version of the game, developed by Feral Interactive, was released on October 29, 2026.

The game is set in the fictional city of Steelport and continues the story of the 3rd Street Saints, once again placing players in the role of the gang's leader, who is fully customizable. Years after the events of Saints Row 2, the Saints have grown from their humble origins as a street gang into a large media and consumer empire with their own brand, while many of the gang's members have become celebrities and pop culture icons. After being stranded in Steelport, which is firmly ruled by an international crime organization known as the Syndicate, the Saints must rebuild their forces once more to take over the city and defeat the Syndicate, as well as S.T.A.G., a violent paramilitary contracted with restoring order to Steelport.

Development of Saints Row: The Third began in late 2008, shortly after the release of Saints Row 2. There was high staff turnover from the previous Saints Row team, with only one-fifth of the final 100-person staff having worked on a previous title in the series. They aimed to improve on the series by giving the game a coherent tone, and found it in films such as Hot Fuzz and the game's signature sex toy bat.

The game received generally positive reviews from critics, who praised its general zaniness and customization options. Criticism was aimed at the new setting, which many critics felt was flat and underdeveloped compared to the previous games' Stilwater, and the lackluster humor. On the contrary, others thought the game perfected the Saints Row formula. It was a nominee for Best Narrative at the 2012 Game Developers Conference, an IGN Editor's Choice, and a recipient of perfect scores from GamesRadar and G4. A complete edition including the three downloadable content packs was released in 2012, and its planned Enter the Dominatrix expansion became the game's sequel, Saints Row IV, released in 2013.

== Gameplay ==
Saints Row: The Third is an action-adventure game played from the third-person perspective in an open world, such that players explore an unrestricted environment. Similar to the premise of the previous Saints Row games, the player's goal is to lead the Third Street Saints gang to overtake its rival gangs in a city-wide turf war. While the protagonist is the same, the game introduces a new setting, the city of Steelport, (Note: Eurogamer called Steelport a cross between New York City and Detroit. An introductory mission explains the gang's exit from Stilwater, where the first two games were set.) with its own three gangs: the Morningstar, Luchadores, and Deckers, together known as the Syndicate. (Note: The three gang personalities are the European-esque Morningstar, the Mexican wrestler Luchadores, and the "cyberpunk hacker" Deckers.) To further complicate matters, the government's Special Tactical Anti-Gang unit (STAG) is summoned to quell both organizations. Saints Row: The Third is the first in the series to intertwine the narratives of its three-gang structures, and presents the player with story-altering decisions.

The player shooting as a vehicle explodes; ambient challenge progress is shown on the right.

The series has been considered a clone of Grand Theft Auto that later positioned itself as more "gleefully silly" in comparison. In combat, players select weapons from a weapon selection wheel, (Note: In a change from previous games, grenades have been removed from the weapon selection wheel for their own dedicated button, and food has been removed altogether in exchange for faster health regeneration.) including pistols, submachine guns, shotguns, and rocket launchers alongside special weapons such as UAV drones and a fart-in-a-jar stun grenade. Player melee attacks include running attacks such as DDTs and a purple dildo bat. Players may use vehicles to navigate the city, including a hover jet (known as the F-69 VTOL) and a pixelated retrogame tank that are unlocked through story missions. Once special vehicles are unlocked, they are in unlimited supply and can be delivered directly to the player-character's location. Player actions are intensified with what Volition calls the "awesome button", where for example the player will divekick through the windshield into the driver's seat of a car. The main story campaign missions can be played alone, or cooperatively either online or via System Link offline. (Note: Cooperative gameplay is "drop-in and drop-out" such that players can come and go, with their individual game progress saved for later single-player play. Both the online and offline modes require a paid online pass.) Some elements are added to the campaign for the second player. There is no competitive multiplayer, but a "wave-based survival mode" called Whored Mode supports up to two players.

Players customize their characters after the introductory mission. Player character bodies, dress, and vehicles can be customized, (Note: Cars customizations include wheel spikes, and weapon upgrades add extra firepower and aesthetic features. Player customization options allow for non-human avatars such as aliens, super heroes, and zombies, and can be recustomized later through plastic surgery locations.) as well as home properties. Players can additionally share their character designs in a Saints Row online community. Apart from the main story missions, there are optional diversions to make money and earn reputation, such as Insurance Fraud, where players hurt themselves in traffic to maximize self-injury before a timer expires, or Mayhem, where players maximize property destruction in a limited amount of time. Some of these diversions were introduced in previous Saints Row games. (Note: Activities involving trucks leaking sewage, blazing all-terrain vehicles, and celebrity defense were removed, though activities such as helicopter assaults and prostitute escorts were kept. New diversions include Trailblazer (where the player avoids obstacles while racing down a halfpipe), Guardian Angel (where the player must drive fast to placate a tiger in the passenger seat), Trafficking (where the player delivers drugs), and Prof. Genki's Super Ethical Reality Climax (an "arena-style shooting gallery").) Activities serve the plot and are positioned as training the player-character or damaging the Syndicate. They can also be repeated. Outside of structured diversions, players are free to make their own fun by purchasing property, shopping for items, finding hidden sex doll and money cache collectibles, and wreaking unsolicited havoc. There are also "flashpoint" gang operations that grant respect when disrupted. Attacking others increases the player's notoriety level, as depicted with stars.

Saints Row: The Third introduces experience levels and weapon upgrades to the series. Most actions in the game come with incentives in the form of money and respect (reputation). Money buys land, weapons, and other upgrades, (Note: Purchased property brings in an hourly income for the player.) and respect is a kind of experience point that can unlock player abilities like "no damage from falling" or "infinite sprint", (Note: These abilities and unlocks are upgraded in increments. By level 50, the maximum player level, the player can become fully invulnerable to bullets, fire, and fall damage, and additionally have unlimited ammo with no reloading time.) as well as upgrades to the player's computer-controlled gang member support. In turn, players receive further incentive to nearly miss car collisions, streak naked through the streets, shoot others in the groin, blow up Smart cars, and kill mascots in ambient challenges to earn more respect. Lack of respect does not hinder story progress, as it did in previous games. Player progress and unlocks are managed by an in-game cell phone menu that also lets the player call for vehicle deliveries and non-player character backup. The computer-controlled support will dialogue with each other.

== Plot ==
Three years after the events of Saints Row 2, the 3rd Street Saints have merged with the Ultor Corporation to become a media and consumer empire with their own brand. While robbing a bank in Stilwater to promote an upcoming film about themselves, the Boss (Troy Baker, Kenn Michael, Robin Atkin Downes, Laura Bailey, Tara Platt, Rebecca Sanabria or Steve Blum) and the Saints' top lieutenants, Shaundi (Danielle Nicolet) and Johnny Gat (Daniel Dae Kim), encounter unanticipated resistance on the job, which ultimately leads to them being arrested. The group is bailed out by Phillipe Loren (Jacques Hennequet), head of an international criminal enterprise called "the Syndicate" that owned the bank they robbed, and held as captives aboard his jumbo jet. After refusing Loren's deal to give him most of their profits in exchange for their lives, the Saints stage a breakout, though Gat is forced to sacrifice himself to allow the Boss and Shaundi to escape. In response to the incident, Loren orders the Syndicate to attack the Saints, and ensure that their empire is destroyed.

Shaundi and the Boss land in the city of Steelport, firmly ruled by the Syndicate's three divisions: the Morningstar, a sophisticated gang led by Loren and his lieutenants, twin sisters Viola (Sasha Grey) and Kiki DeWynter (Megan Hollingshead), who dominate the gun and sex trades; the Deckers, a hacker gang led by Matt Miller (Yuri Lowenthal), who dominate the city's cyber black-market; and the Luchadores, a Mexican wrestler-themed gang led by Eddie "Killbane" Pryor (Rick D. Wasserman), who operate their own casino and deal steroids. After Saints lieutenant Pierce Washington (Arif S. Kinchen) arrives with backup, the Saints secure a hideout and go after Loren's operations, ultimately killing him inside his own skyscraper. In the process, they rescue Oleg Kirrlov (Mark Allen Stuart), a former KGB agent being forcefully cloned to provide super-soldiers for the Syndicate, who helps them track down other allies: ex-FBI agent Kinzie Kensington (Natalie Lander), who seeks to disrupt the Deckers; veteran pimp Zimos (Alex Désert), who lost his business to the Morningstar; and Angel de la Muerte (Hulk Hogan), Killbane's embittered former wrestling partner.

Killbane steps in to succeed the late Loren as leader of the Syndicate, and soon kills Kiki in a jealous rage when she refuses to take orders from him. Out of anger, Viola defects to the Saints and helps them finish off the Morningstar. Meanwhile, the lawlessness in Steelport leads to the federal government approving the deployment of a task force to combat it: the Special Tactical Anti-Gang initiative (S.T.A.G.), led by Cyrus Temple (Tim Thomerson) and supervised by Senator Monica Hughes (Tasia Valenza), the widow of the Saints' old nemesis Richard Hughes. Armed with highly advanced technology, S.T.A.G. puts the city under martial law until order is restored. During this time, the Saints focus on the Deckers, with the Boss acquiring items needed by Kinzie to allow access to the Deckers' network with a virtual avatar. Once inside, the Boss battles Matt's avatar and defeats it, forcing Matt to retire his gang and leave the city. With only the Luchadores left, Angel and Viola suggest humiliating Killbane during his next major wrestling match, resulting in him going on a rampage across Steelport after he loses.

While pursuing Killbane amidst the chaos, the Boss is informed that Shaundi, Viola and Mayor Burt Reynolds (himself) have been kidnapped by S.T.A.G. and taken to Steelport's most prominent monument, which has been rigged with explosives. At this point, the player must choose between continuing the Boss' pursuit of Killbane, or trying to stop S.T.A.G. In the canon ending, the Boss rescues their allies and prevents the monument's destruction, resulting in the Saints being hailed as heroes and Monica Hughes withdrawing S.T.A.G. after its actions become severely questioned by the government. The Saints decide not to pursue Killbane, who has fled Steelport, and instead resume their consumer activities, focusing on a new film called Gangstas In Space that stars the Boss. If the player alternatively chooses to pursue Killbane, the Boss ultimately kills him, but Shaundi, Viola and Reynolds die when S.T.A.G. destroys the monument, which the Saints are framed for. The Boss exacts revenge and destroys S.T.A.G.'s flying aircraft carrier, before declaring Steelport an independent nation under the Saints' rule.

== Development ==
I feel like I'm playing something unlike anything else—we know what Saints Row is now.

— Design director Scott Phillips on handling the Penetrator (dildo bat) for the first time

Saints Row 2's design philosophy was to "put everything ... into the game", which made for a disjointed title with varied tone. Design director Scott Phillips said the series' legacy of lightheartedness made the sequel's tone hard to define. The development team withstood a high turnover between the two releases, with only a fifth of the final 100-person team having worked on a title in the series before. (Note: Phillips and producer Greg Donovan, meanwhile, had only been with the series since Saints Row 2.) Saints Row: The Third was in development by September 2008 as Saints Row 3. For its first six months of development, the team tested a choice-based adventure concept featuring an undercover agent infiltrating the Saints, which was dropped for not aligning with the spirit of the series. Now without a vision, the team made a "tone video" with film segments and songs that would define the new title. The final version featured bits from Bad Boys II, Shoot 'Em Up, Hot Fuzz, and Mötley Crüe's "Kickstart My Heart". The team worked in this direction to find a personality for Saints Row: The Third, which it found in its signature "dildo bat". The idea started as one-off mission-specific weapon and the artists ran with the concept. (Note: Some other weapon ideas were cut from the game for being more "distasteful" than "over the top", one such rejected item was the "fart in a jar" that incapacitated foes by making them vomit. This item was later included in the game.) Their design mantra became "Embrace the Crazy; Fun Trumps All".

They came to the conclusion that "everything had to be 'over the top this time around'" so as to distinguish Saints Row: The Third from other open world titles and to make the franchise into a AAA title. The team increased playtesting to check for the action's pacing and "setpiece moments" within its overall flow. Producer Greg Donovan considered Saints Row: The Third a reboot of the franchise, "cohesive" in a way the prior two "semi-serious" entries were not. Other than "over the top" themes, the team wanted "holy shit" "water cooler moments" that players would remember forever and want to share. Phillips also "didn't want the player to be a dick".

The city of Steelport was designed such that the player could identify locations without needing a minimap, with a spatially recognizable skyline and iconic gang vehicles in specific regions.

The title was not shown at the 2010 Electronic Entertainment Expo (E3) with the explanation that the company had spent the year "rebuilding the technology", but a tie-in movie was mentioned as in production and a Saints Row 3 announcement was expected at the December Spike VGAs. Saints Row: The Third was finally announced officially in March 2011. The team wanted to include many different features and items, so scoping the final product became an issue. They laid out their ideas on a schedule and began to cut until over "4000 man-days of scheduled work" were removed, including features such as free-running (called "freegunning") and a cover system. Competitive multiplayer was removed due to its lack of popularity in the previous series entries. In retrospect, Phillips said he wanted to remove more. The studio borrowed people from other parts of the company to finish the project. Writer Drew Holmes expressed the difficulty in determining what was too risqué for the game. In keeping with series advertising, Saints Row: The Third included porn star Sasha Grey in the production as a character voice. Other celebrity voice actors include Hulk Hogan and Daniel Dae Kim.

The development team also pre-visualized rough drafts to sketch ideas for others to advance. For example, the introductory airplane level was pre-visualized two years prior to its creation as a demonstration for the development team and publisher. Levels were built in a world editor by Volition's Core Technology Group (CTG), which was continually built in the four years preceding release. Like the other two titles, Saints Row: The Third uses Havok's physics middleware with customizations. which let the team build vehicle drifting physics and the VTOL aircraft. The studio considered the Red Faction series' Geo-Mod 2 engine but chose against it due to the implementation's difficulty and not wanting that degree of destruction. Phillips gave a game development postmortem at the 2012 Game Developers Conference, where he advised studios to let development team members run with their ideas. Volition began to add modding support to the title and series in mid 2013.

=== Audio ===
Saints Row: The Third has a licensed soundtrack available as radio stations when driving in vehicles. Players can switch between the playlists, which range from classical to electronic to hip hop, rock, or customize their own station based on their preferences. A notable inclusion is the fictional radio station "WDDT CPDG The Swim", with various licensed tracks featuring artists and themes from various Adult Swim shows. The original soundtrack was composed by Malcolm Kirby Jr., who had previously worked on The Love Guru's soundtrack. It was released through Sumthing Else Music Works alongside the game via compact disc and digital download. Kirby said the series' over-the-top nature influenced the score, and that he was a huge fan of the series before he received the opportunity. In his composition, each gang has a theme and specific characteristics that range from "menacing orchestral to gangster hip hop to heavy metal".

== Marketing and release ==
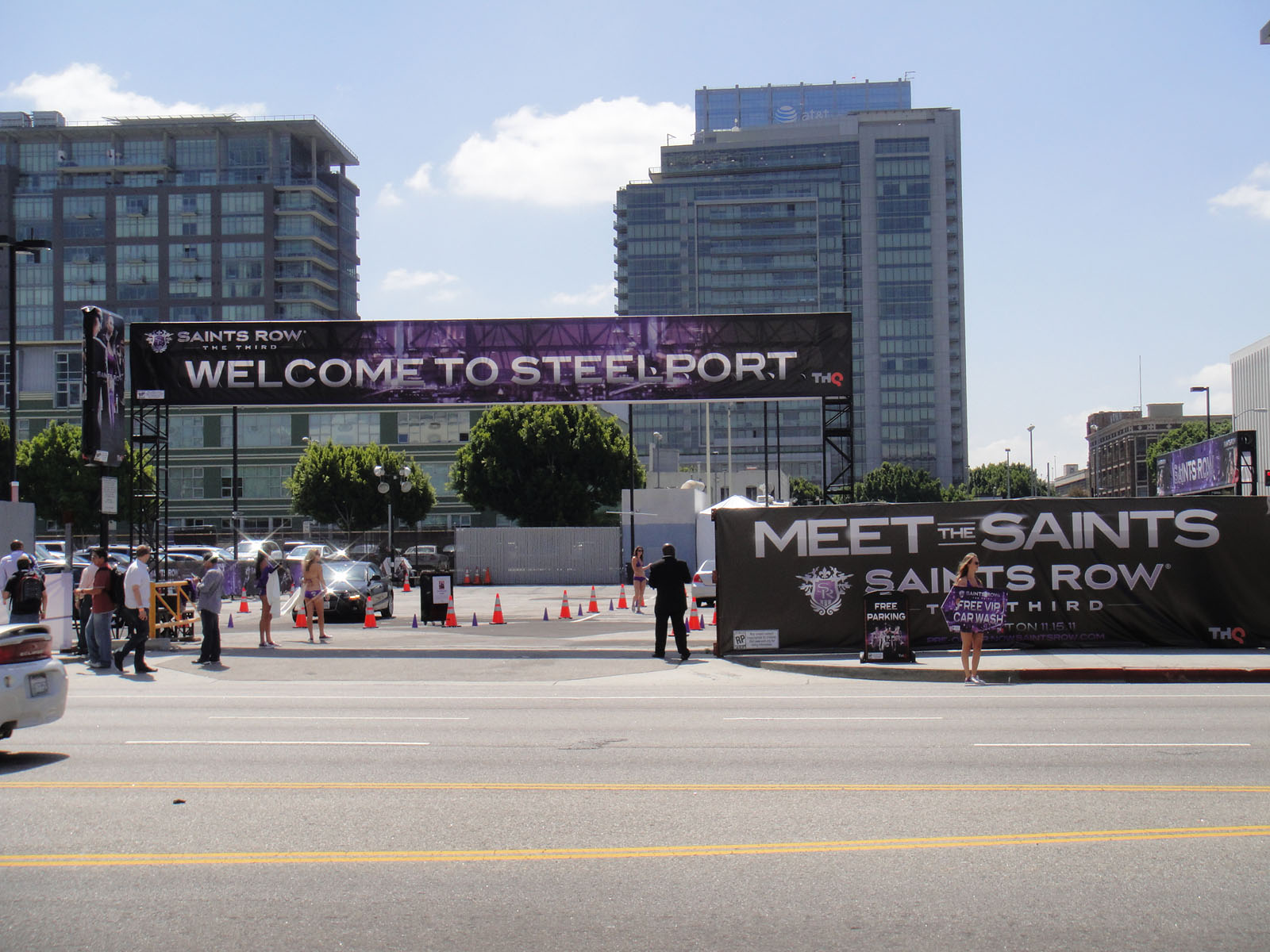
Promotional car wash event at E3 2011

The game was released for Microsoft Windows, PlayStation 3, and Xbox 360 simultaneously on November 15, 2011, in the United States and Australia, and three days later in the United Kingdom. The November 17, 2011, Japan release had the veins removed from the Penetrator weapon (the three-foot long phallus bat) due to regulatory restrictions on depictions of genitalia. In lieu of exclusive game content scheduled for the PlayStation 3 version that did not ship with the game, early North American and European players who purchased that version received a complimentary download code for Saints Row 2. The summer before Saints Row: The Third's release, THQ pledged to support it with a year's worth of downloadable content. Around the time of release, Danny Bilson of THQ announced that Saints Row IV was already in planning.

Those who preordered the game received Professor Genki's Hyper Ordinary Preorder Pack, which included Genki-themed downloadable content (a costume, a vehicle, and a weapon). A North American limited edition box set release called the Platinum Pack included the preorder content, the soundtrack, and a custom headset. (Note: The headset is not compatible with Xbox Live or PlayStation Network.) Australia and New Zealand received two limited editions: the Smooth Criminal pack from EB Games and the Maximum Pleasure bundle from JB Hi-Fi, each of which included tie-in items along with the game and preorder content. (Note: The Smooth Criminal edition included sunglasses, an ice cube tray, cuff links, and the soundtrack, while the Maximum Pleasure edition included a replica of Genki's head, a Genki key ring, and a pen.)

Though the game was not shown at E3 2010, THQ spoke of extensive tie-in merchandising (collectible card game, books) and a Saints Row film in production as part of a "robust transmedia play". Instead, THQ announced Saints Row: Drive By, a tie-in game for the Nintendo 3DS and Xbox Live Arcade that would unlock content in Saints Row 3. (Note: Saints Row: Drive By was canceled the next year (May 2011) without comment.) After the game was announced in March 2011, it was featured on the cover of Game Informer's April issue. Closer to release, THQ sent rap group the Broken Pixels a development kit with a pre-release version of the game and asked them to record track about "all the wacky things" to do in the game. The group wrote the rap in a day and later produced a YouTube video set to clips from the game. THQ hosted an event in Redfern, Australia where women in skintight clothes pumped free gas for three hours, which generated an estimated 35 times return on investment. Eurogamer recalled that the game was "marketed almost exclusively on the basis of all the wacky stuff it will let you do" from the costumes to the sex toy weapons, and Edge described Saints Row: The Third as "marketed by sex toys and porn stars".

Two weeks before the game's release, Saints Row: The Third had four times the preorder count of Saints Row 2 at its comparable point. By January 2012, the game had shipped 3.8 million units worldwide, which THQ cited as an example for its business model change to focus on the big franchises. THQ President and CEO Brian Farrell expected to ship five to six million copies of the game in its lifetime. It had reached four million by April, and 5.5 million by the end of the year. Saints Row: The Third was an unexpected continued success for the company. It was featured in promotions with Humble Bundle, (Note: Polygon called the THQ Humble Bundle "a quick success" for grossing $2 million its first day.) PlayStation Plus, and Xbox Live Games with Gold over the next several years.

Volition released a Linux port of the game in 2016, and made the Xbox 360 release compatible with its successor, the Xbox One, the next year. In August 2018, Deep Silver announced a Nintendo Switch port, which was released in May 2019. The port was developed by Fishlabs. Deep Silver announced Saints Row: The Third Remastered in April 2020. The remastered version was developed by Sperasoft and features remodeled assets for high-definition, enhanced graphics and lighting, and includes all of the game's downloadable content. The title was released on PlayStation 4, Xbox One, and Microsoft Windows (Note: Timed exclusivity via the Epic Games Store.) on May 22, 2020, with it later being released on Google Stadia on March 5, 2021, Steam on May 22, 2021, and Amazon Luna on July 29, 2021.. An Android and iOS port developed by Feral Interactive is set to release on 29 October 2026.

== Downloadable content ==
Downloadable content for Saints Row: The Third includes additional story missions, weapons, and characters. A "definitive edition", Saints Row: The Third – The Full Package, contains all post-release downloadable content—including all three mission packs ("Genkibowl VII", "Gangstas in Space", and "The Trouble with Clones") and bonus items (clothes, vehicles, and weapons)—in addition to the main game. The Full Package was announced in September 2012 for release two months later on PC, PlayStation 3, and Xbox 360. (Note: The Full Package was released on November 6, 2012, in North America, and ten days later internationally.)

THQ announced an Enter the Dominatrix standalone expansion as an April Fool's joke in 2012. It was confirmed as in development the next month. In Enter the Dominatrix, the alien commander Zinyak imprisons the Saints' leader in a simulation of Steelport called The Dominatrix so as to prevent interference when he takes over the planet. The expansion also added superpowers for the player-character. In June, THQ said the expansion would be wrapped into a full sequel, tentatively titled "The Next Great Sequel in the Saints Row Franchise" and scheduled for a 2013 release. Parts of Enter the Dominatrix that were not incorporated into the sequel, Saints Row IV, were later released as downloadable content for the new title, under the same name.

== Reception ==
Saints Row: The Third reviews

Aggregate score
Aggregator	Score
Metacritic	(PC) 84/100 (PS3) 82/100 (X360) 84/100 (NS) 70/100

Review scores
Publication	Score
Edge	6/10
Eurogamer	7/10
IGN	8.5/10
Official Xbox Magazine (US)	9.5/10
PC Gamer (US)	83%

The game received "generally favorable" reviews, according to video game review score aggregator Metacritic. Some said the game did not try to be more than a good time, and described it as a variant of "ridiculous", "zany", or "absurd". In another way, others called it "juvenile". Critics praised the degree of customization options, and had mixed views of the array of activities, but found Professor Genki's Super Ethical Reality Climax a high point. (Note: Game Informer compared Professor Genki's Super Ethical Reality Climax with the 1987 Arnold Schwarzenegger action film The Running Man.) Some found the game's ironic sexism to verge on misogyny, and that its other humor sometimes fell flat. Several critics referred to the game as the perfection of the Saints Row formula It was a nominee for Best Narrative at the 2012 Game Developers Conference, an IGN Editor's Choice, and a recipient of perfect scores from GamesRadar and G4. During the 15th Annual Interactive Achievement Awards, the Academy of Interactive Arts & Sciences nominated Saints Row: The Third for "Action Game of the Year".

Edge said that the series "wants to be the WarioWare of open-city games", "a cartoon flipbook of anything-goes extremity" to Grand Theft Auto's "ostentatious crime drama". They wrote that the game's "single-minded" "puerile imagination" demanded respect and noted the game's escalation of video game tropes and cultural references from Japanese game shows to text adventures to zombie apocalypses to lucha libre. IGN's Daemon Hatfield called the game "an open world adult theme park". He said that calling it "a good time would be a severe understatement" and praised its method of incentivizing almost every action in the game as "fantastic game design". Hatfield was "addicted" to efficiently expanding his in-game hourly income. GamesRadar's Michael Grimm wrote Saints Row: The Third was nearly surreal, and praised the player-character's running attacks.

Referring to the historical comparison between the Saints Row and Grand Theft Auto series, Dan Whitehead of Eurogamer wrote that Grand Theft Auto IV's serious turn let the Saints Row series be a "gleeful silly sandbox game", and noted that Saints Row: The Third was "marketed almost exclusively" based on its wackiness, from the costumes to the sex toy weapons. He felt that the "wacky hijinks" quickly became "predictable and repetitive" and the activities felt "sanitized and generic". Edge wrote that they were "one-off gags". Eurogamer's Whitehead added that the tiger escort Guardian Angel missions appeared to draw from Will Ferrell's Talladega Nights, and that the Prof. Genki's Super Ethical Reality Climax shooting gallery drew from Bizarre Creations' The Club shooter. Eurogamer and PC Gamer both found the game easy.

Ryan McCaffrey of Official Xbox Magazine thought that the game resolved some of the problems of open world design and thus allowed for an experience with good times and no filler, such as Burnout-style arrows on the streets instead of hidden in the minimap GPS. He added that this was the game Volition "was born to make". Grimm from GamesRadar similarly praised Volition for their "http://deckers.die" mission, which was "so insanely creative and funny that it single handedly makes the game worth playing". He added that the game's unrealistic driving made the game more fun. IGN's Hatfield was "really won ... over" by his character and both was convinced she cared about her friends and impressed by her voice actress. Whitehead of Eurogamer found Zimos, the pimp who speaks in Autotune, to be the game's best character. Edge found some of the writing "sharp" and executed well by the voice actors. PC Gamer's Tom Senior found the major story missions to be a highlight. Hatfield of IGN thought the single-player game fell apart at the end and called the two endings either "a super downer" or nonsense. He found the cooperative mode easy to set up, but felt like the game's missions were not designed well for multiple players, and that the visiting player became a "third wheel". On the other hand, CBS News.com''s Christina Santiago called the cooperative mode "near perfect" and exemplary.

Saints Row's weakest parts are hand-me-downs from its GTA source text, uncomfortably echoing the squalid business of pimpin' and hustlin' in the form of a lame cartoon, a whooping fratboyish endorsement of crime and female degradation, devoid of any conscience or commentary. GTA takes pains to voice moral unease. ... the best solution to that dissonance cannot be to pitch the entire thing into a swamp of near-uniform toxicity.

— Edge review, November 24, 2011

IGN's Hatfield considered the game's graphics average for the age. He "loved the neon-lit towering skyscrapers of Steelport" but thought the streets were sometimes "lifeless", as the game may be "open world" but not a "living world". Edge added that the city was easy enough to navigate, but that it was missing character. Grimm of GamesRadar said it didn't look bad, but wasn't interesting. Multiple reviewers complained of "pop-in", or of graphical errors. 1UP.com reported the PC version's graphics to be more stable, and Eurogamer's Digital Foundry face-off recommended the PlayStation 3 release for its lack of screen tearing.

Eurogamer's Whitehead felt that the game crept closer "from ironic sexism to outright misogyny" in missions such as "Trojan Whores" and set pieces like "Tits n' Grits" and "Stikit Inn", even in the series' "gloriously lowbrow standards". Edge added that intent of humor in the sex trafficking-related mission "The Ho Boat" did not come across well, and seemed to be included only for shock value. Hatfield of IGN related that some of the game's more juvenile aspects made him cringe, and Edge wrote that the game felt "largely meaningless" in response to the desensitizing barrage of "context-free frippery". PC Gamer's Tom Senior said he was almost offended during much of the game but stayed more happy than disgusted, adding that while the game has a "huge purple dildo", it doesn't have the prostitute-killing liberties or "other moments of nastiness" associated with the Grand Theft Auto franchise.

Whitehead of Eurogamer wrote in conclusion that the game doesn't propose "anything particularly inventive" and instead ends up with a toy box of gadgets. Edge felt that the game was weakest where it leaned on Grand Theft Auto's precedent without adding a social commentary. Eurogamer's Whitehead added that Saints Row: The Third missed an opportunity to separate from "the GTA formula", which Edge thought was done well in the last third of the game. IGN, however, felt the game was explicitly not a Grand Theft Auto clone, and G4 called it "a knockoff no more".

During an interview on the future of THQ in June 2012, its president, Jason Rubin, responded to the interviewer's concerns that Saints Row: The Third was not a game he wanted to play in front of his family by saying that, while he does not consider there to be no place in the company "for a game that features a purple dildo", (Note: Rubin acknowledged that South Park: The Stick of Truth also featured such an item, stating that it worked for that series in particular.) Volition chose that route because of the limited options and their "environment at the time", and he was looking to push the publisher and its studios to do better.
