= Enter the Dominatrix =

Additional content pack for the 2013 video game Saints Row IV

- Developer: Volition
- Publisher: Deep Silver
- Series: Saints Row
- Platforms: Microsoft Windows; PlayStation 3 PlayStation 4 Xbox 360; Xbox One; Linux; Nintendo Switch
- Release: October 22, 2013: Microsoft Windows, PlayStation 3, Xbox 360; WW: October 22, 2013 PlayStation 4, Xbox One; NA: January 20, 2015; EU: January 23, 2015 Linux; WW: December 21, 2015 Nintendo Switch; WW: March 27, 2020
- Genre: Action-adventure
- Modes: Single-player, multiplayer

Saints Row IV: Enter the Dominatrix is a downloadable content pack for the 2013 video game Saints Row IV that includes an alternate story of the alien Zin invasion. The dialogue often breaks the fourth wall and its style is self-referential in nature. Enter the Dominatrix draws on its history as originally produced as downloadable content for the game's predecessor, Saints Row: The Third. It was first announced on April Fool's Day in 2012, later confirmed, and then cancelled to be incorporated into Saints Row IV, which drew on some aspects of the original idea and left the rest for this story pack. It was released on October 22, 2013, to mixed or average reviews. Critics appreciated the pack's treatment of its own history, what Eurogamer's Chris Schilling called a "very postmodern conceit".

== Gameplay ==
Enter the Dominatrix tells an alternative story of the Zin invasion from Saints Row IV where the simulation of Steelport is hijacked by a rogue artificial intelligence called the Dominatrix. The pack draws on its origins as Saints Row: The Third downloadable content that was later delayed and repackaged. It also frequently breaks the fourth wall—its story's incongruence with the larger Saints Row story is a recurring theme, where the characters self-referentially acknowledge the plot holes. The story advances through cutscene clips presented as "unseen footage" found by television journalist Jane Valderama, as "what could have been". Some scenes end in concept art or videos of Volition employees acting out the drama so as to give the game an unfinished feel. The pack also casts characters from Saints Row: The Third who did not return in the sequel. The player fights the Dominatrix—who appears as a cross between Maleficent and a sex worker—several times. Other missions include using telekinesis to cage furries at a sex club and a BDSM chariot race. There are five missions in total. The pack introduces new weapons such as a heavy minigun, a flamethrower and a grenade launcher, new vehicles, and new computer-controlled support characters ("homies"). Up to two players can play cooperatively.

== Plot ==
The events of the game are narrated from the perspective of the 3rd Street Saints as they and Zinyak (JB Blanc) are being interviewed about the deleted scenes of Enter the Dominatrix. Because of this, the narrative features many retcons, plot holes, and over-the-top moments, which the Saints openly acknowledge.

The "director's cut" of Enter the Dominatrix takes place one year after the non-canon ending of Saints Row: The Third, although Saints lieutenant Shaundi (Danielle Nicolet) is inexplicably still alive. The Saints still rule over Steelport, and lieutenant Pierce Washington (Arif S. Kinchen) has been elected mayor following Mayor Burt Reynolds' death. One day, Zinyak's Zin forces suddenly invade the city, and the Saints fight them off, though Josh Birk (Andrew Bowen) is 'tragically' killed while fighting a giant cyclops. Eventually, the Boss (Troy Baker, Kenn Michael, Robin Atkin Downes, Laura Bailey, Diane Michelle, Sumalee Montano, or Nolan North) faces Zinyak himself and kills him.

Following Zinyak's death, the Zin's rogue AI called the Dominatrix assumes command of the remaining Zin forces and traps the Saints in a simulation of Steelport, which she controls. The Saints recruit several allies to help them fight the Dominatrix, who eventually summons a giant soda can called Paul to wreak havoc in the simulation. The Saints build a spaceship to go inside Paul and destroy its brain, killing it and weakening the Dominatrix. After the Boss defeats the Dominatrix, Pierce arrives with backup: talking velociraptors, who take them to their king, Cirano. Cirano helps the Saints escape the simulation and grants each of them a wish.

== Development ==
THQ announced an Enter the Dominatrix standalone expansion for Saints Row: The Third as an April Fool's joke in 2012. It was confirmed as being in development the next month, with the basic plot where the alien commander Zinyak imprisons the Saints' leader in The Dominatrix simulation of Steelport so as to prevent interference when he takes over the planet. The expansion also was to add superpowers for the player character. In June, THQ said the expansion would be wrapped into a full sequel, tentatively titled "The Next Great Sequel in the Saints Row Franchise" and scheduled for release in 2013. The parts of that expansion that were not incorporated into the sequel (Saints Row IV) were later released as this downloadable content for the new title. It was developed by Volition, published by Deep Silver, and released on October 22, 2013.

Enter the Dominatrix was followed by the "How the Saints Saved Christmas" downloadable content pack. High Voltage Software ported Saints Row IV and all of its downloadable content, including Enter the Dominatrix, to the PlayStation 4 and Xbox One as Saints Row IV: Re-Elected, which was released in North America on January 20, 2015, and worldwide three days later. A Linux port was released later that same year.

== Reception ==
Reception

Aggregate score
Aggregator	Score
Metacritic	68/100

Review scores
Publication	Score
Electronic Gaming Monthly	7.5/10
Eurogamer	6/10
Official Xbox Magazine (US)	7.5/10

Enter the Dominatrix received "mixed or average reviews", according to video game review score aggregator Metacritic. Chris Schilling of Eurogamer, citing the game's development history, called Enter the Dominatrix "a fascinating case study in how games evolve". Electronic Gaming Monthly's Eric Patterson also commented on how downloadable content in the industry is seen as content pulled from the retail release to be sold as an addition, which Enter the Dominatrix's development history flips on its head. He added that in all of his industry experience, he had never otherwise seen a developer purposefully let its fans play "shelved" content, and thus found the experience "fascinating". Official Xbox Magazine's Mikel Reparaz said it was fun to see what "could have been".

Eurogamer's Schilling called the self-referential nature of the release a "very postmodern conceit", which he thought worked well despite the dual faux pas of parodying The Matrix and overtly "satirizing game mechanics". He felt that the satire was not good, though the writing was "genuinely funny", and that the repeated Dominatrix fight scenes should not have felt as low budget. He recommended the pack for those who love "wry gags about creaky gaming tropes with the occasional belly laugh", and said he had a better time finding his own fun than playing through the missions. Patterson of Electronic Gaming Monthly noted that those who are looking for cost benefit would be disappointed by lack of content, especially those who had already finished the main game, but he was interested in Enter the Dominatrix for its behind-the-scenes aspects, which he encouraged other developers to use more often.
