= Summoner 2 =

2002 video game

- US box art for PS2 version
- Developer: Volition (Note: Ported to GameCube by Cranky Pants Games.)
- Publisher: THQ
- Designer: Sandeep Shekar
- Programmer: James Hague
- Artists: Mitri Vanichtheeranont; Frank Marquart
- Writer: Jason Scott
- Composers: Dan Wentz; Franky Vivid; Kate Marlin-Nelson
- Platforms: PlayStation 2, GameCube
- Release: PlayStation 2: NA: September 23, 2002; EU: November 1, 2002; GameCube: NA: February 4, 2003; EU: April 11, 2003
- Genre: Action role-playing
- Mode: Single-player

Summoner 2 is a 2002 action role-playing game developed by Volition and published by THQ as the sequel to Summoner. It was originally released for PlayStation 2 in 2002 and was ported to the GameCube in 2003 by Cranky Pants Games with some visual changes as Summoner: A Goddess Reborn. The game features improved visuals and a more real-time, action-oriented combat system from the original.

Instead of Joseph, the player now takes on the role of Maia, Queen of Halassar, who is the goddess Laharah reborn, and can transform herself into a variety of "summonable" creatures. Maia must heal the legendary Tree of Eleh, the source of Aosi, the language of creation. Along the way, she meets a host of characters, including Yago from the original Summoner game.

== Gameplay ==
Similar to its predecessor, combat is in real time, with spells cast over time depending on the complexity of the spell. The chain attack system from the first game was removed in favor of a more traditional button combo and guard system. Skills are increased as the characters level up, and equipment is collected, including skills that are specific for AI controlled characters, meaning the player can focus playing a specific character if desired. Some enemies will respawn over time.

Unlike the first game, which was played with an unchangeable 5 member party (except for the summon), Summoner 2 only allows up to 3 characters to be in the party at once, although these characters are picked from a group of 7. Some sections of the game have a fixed character set-up, and most sections require Maia to be in the party. Also unlike the first game, overworld travel is done point to point, with no random encounters during travel. In addition to forwarding the main plot, Maia can also directly influence the development of the kingdom. She can donate gold collected from her adventures to improve the health services, education, and military of her realm, and also issue judgements on a variety of political issues. The decisions made will have repercussions later in the game.

== Story ==
Taking place two decades after the events of the previous game, the story is set around Maia, Queen of Halassar, the prophesised reincarnation of the Goddess Laharah whose followers believe created the known world from the Tree of Eleh only to disappear after it was destroyed by the Tempest. Halassar had been a province of its southerly neighbour, the Empire of Galdyr then ruled by king Azraman II, until winning its freedom following Maia's birth in a religious uprising led by the priestess Surdama Kir, aided by Azraman's brother Prince Taurgis and the Munari oligarch Mas Raldo. Surdama Kir then led the nascent kingdom in a regency, espousing that it was Maia's destiny to restore the Tree of Eleh, until Maia was old enough to lead in her own name, while Azraman continues to seek to reclaim the province and denounces Kir's claims.

While attempting to retrieve the Book of the Prophets from the pirate Prince Neru on the Isle of Teomura with the aid of former assassin turned trusted friend Sangaril, the recently-enthroned Maia discovers she possesses the ability to transform into guardian creatures recorded in the prophecy after activating rune stones. Upon reaching the pirate leader she finds that he is willing to return the book in exchange for her capturing and handing over Krobelus, the Hierophant of Urath and leader of a crusade currently attacking Halassar. Maia attempts to achieve this, defeating Krobelus' crusaders at the Imperial Sepulchure, only for the seemingly possessed Hierophant to declare himself the Tempest and vanish before them.

Attempts to locate Krobelus within the kingdom fail, only for an emissary of Galdyr to reveal that he appeared from thin air within their lands before being imprisoned within the prison of Indubal. Maia, with aid from Sangaril and Taurgis, manages to free Krobelus from his imprisonment only to be confronted by Azraman who demands Maia "prove" her claims via multiple trials, before being defeated in a duel with Taurgis.

After defeating the king, Maia is led by Krobelus to Munari City in pursuit of a being named Morbazan who supposedly led him and a party to a surviving fragment of the Tree of Eleh where he claims to have been possessed by the Tempest. Reaching the city, and once again coming across and later being joined by Neru, Maia finds that Morbazan is a gladiator within the city's arena. Morbazan agrees to lead her to the fragment in exchange for a weapon of The Unseen (feared by the Munari as the secret rulers of the city). Upon finding this weapon, they find it to be a living machine named Iari. While seemingly disappointed Morbazan agrees to lead the party to the Eleh fragment where they come across Yago, a former ally of the previous summoner Joseph searching for his daughter Rosalind who has disappeared without a trace. Yago also recognises Neru, with the latter revealed to be a servant of the previous Hierophant whom the possessed Krobelus had murdered.

Venturing into the Eleh fragment, the group find it overrun by various parasitic organisms slowly destroying it and therefore reality itself. After finally ridding the fragment of them the group find themselves split up and cast across the Realm of Twilight to various fates. Maia eventually manages to free all but Krobelus (who had already disappeared), in the process discovering that Morbazan and Iari (whose soul is contained in machine-form) are in fact the last of The Unseen, who had previously ruled the Realm of Twilight until those following the Tempest killed them and forced them into exile.

After battling various forces of the Tempest, weakening its grip on the Realm of Twilight in the process, the group are able to return to Halassar. Before this Maia has a vision of the Tree of Eleh and converses with the spirit of Rosalind as well as the spirit of Joseph in the form of Urath who help Maia realise that she is not merely Laharah reborn but the embodiment of creation itself, Aosi. On arrival, Maia finds out that Azraman has been deposed by Krobelus, once again enslaved by the Tempest, with Galdyr now under the control of the mad king Imarbeth who himself had been deposed and imprisoned in Indubal by Azraman and Taurgis’ father.

The forces of Halassar, led by Maia, are soon able to fight their way through Krobelus’ inhuman creatures to the Galdyran capital, the Tamirath Citadel, where Taurgis reveals that he had a religious epiphany that resulted in joining the Halassar cause as well as leading to his brother to begrudgingly halt his attempts to reconquer the province. After defeating a transformed Imarbeth and freeing Azraman (who as a result accepts Halassar’s independence), Maia proceeds back to the Imperial Sepulchure which the possessed Krobelus has once again captured.

Within the now defiled Sepulchure the party not only find Krobelus but also a corrupted Surdama Kir and the Tempest itself unleashed. Splitting up, Morbazan aids Neru in finding vengeance again Krobelus while Taurgis and Sangaril defeat Kir, leaving Maia, Iari, and Yago to fight first a corrupted incarnation of the dead Rosalind before fighting the Tempest itself. Maia is mortally wounded while attempting to defeat the Tempest, forcing Iari to combine her soul with hers. The combined entity is finally able to defeat the Tempest, upon which Maia/Iari are transformed into a remade Tree of Eleh that sits upon the site of the Sepulchure. In the aftermath Morbazan returns to the Realm of Twilight, Yago sails back to Medeva, Neru departs to places unknown, while Taurgis and Sangaril remain in Halassar to mourn the loss of their friend.

== Reception ==
Reception

Aggregate score
Aggregator	Score	
Aggregator	GameCube	PS2
Metacritic	72/100	76/100

Review scores
Publication	Score	
Publication	GameCube	PS2
Electronic Gaming Monthly	6.5/10	7/10 (Note: Three critics of Electronic Gaming Monthly gave the PlayStation 2 version each a score of 7/10, 6.5/10, and 7.5/10.)
Eurogamer	N/A	5/10
Game Informer	9/10	9/10
GameRevolution	C+	B−
GameSpot	7.4/10	7.9/10
GameSpy	2/5	4/5
GameZone	8.2/10	8.4/10
IGN	8/10	8.4/10
Nintendo Power	3.7/5	N/A
Nintendo World Report	7.5/10	N/A
Official U.S. PlayStation Magazine	N/A	3.5/5
RPGFan	N/A	86%
X-Play	3/5	4/5

The original Summoner 2 received "generally favorable reviews", while A Goddess Reborn received "mixed or average reviews", according to the review aggregation website Metacritic. Star Dingo of GamePro's December 2002 issue said of the former game, "Anyone willing to dive into this science-fantasy swirl will be duly rewarded with one of the more memorable and unique RPGs to ever grace the PS2. Unfortunately, it's a plunge most will be unwilling to take...on the surface, Summoner 2 looks a little too cold." (Note: GamePro gave the PlayStation 2 version 3/5 for graphics, and three 4/5 scores for sound, control, and fun factor.) Four issues later, he said of the latter, "While it may not be the most technically advanced RPG on the market by any stretch of the imagination, Summoner: A Goddess Reborn still manages to break through its weaknesses to stretch your imagination." (Note: GamePro gave the GameCube version two 3.5/5 scores for graphics and control, and two 4/5 scores for sound and fun factor.)

GameSpot named the same console version the best GameCube game of February 2003 in review.
