= Beyond the Red Line =

- Engine: FreeSpace Open
- Platform(s): Microsoft Windows, Linux, Mac OS X
- Release: WW: March 31, 2007
- Genre(s): Space simulation
- Mode(s): Single-player, multiplayer

Beyond the Red Line was a total conversion for the game FreeSpace 2, based on the reimagined TV show Battlestar Galactica. It allows players to fly into combat as either a Colonial Viper pilot or a Cylon raider.

== Gameplay ==
BtRL planned to feature an original soundtrack with pieces inspired by Bear McCreary and Richard Gibbs' soundtrack. It also intended to include character-based gameplay and voice acting. The three-mission demo campaign follows a storyline that precedes the episode, "Scar", adding some background to the events of that episode. Online multiplayer, including "Deathmatch" and "Team vs. Team", is supported. The Mk II and VII Vipers are featured with authentic weaponry, flight controls, and semi-Newtonian physics (the development team stated that, "if you've seen it on the show, you can do it in BtRL").

== Development ==
On March 31, 2007, a demo was released that allowed players to play a tutorial, two single player missions and multiplayer. This demo has since been noted or reviewed in various gaming related websites and magazines such as The Escapist, Macworld, PC Gamer UK and Pelit. The development team has been interviewed on several occasions including a "making of" special in Pelit. The BtRL demo has also been featured on the covers of two Ukrainian magazines as well as in cover DVD of Finnish computer magazine Mikrobitti.

In October 2008, the majority of the team announced that they had left the Beyond the Red Line development team to work on a different project, known as Diaspora. Although Diaspora is also a Battlestar Galactica game built on the FreeSpace 2 engine, it is being developed independently of BTRL and the projects have no affiliation with each other.

In August 2009, it was announced that as a consequence of the Diaspora fork, BtRL's subsequent inactivity, and BtRL's perceived hostility toward its fans since the split, BtRL would no longer be hosted at Game Warden, its historical home.

The Diaspora fork was completed and released in September 2012.

== Reception ==
In February 2008 Beyond the Red Line received Mod DB's "Mod of the Year Award" for "Best Independent Game". That same year the game was also recommended over the official Battlestar video game (released: 2007 for Xbox Live Arcade and Windows PC), citing the latter game's low production values and publisher's mishandling of the license. In 2008 the game was featured in Popular Science magazine. In December 2007 the game was featured in Computer and Video Games' "The Best PC Mods. Ever!" review.
