= The Babylon Project =

1997 role-playing game

The Babylon Project is a 1997 role-playing game published by Chameleon Eclectic Entertainment.

== Gameplay ==
The Babylon Project is a game in which players are immersed as humans, Minbari, Narns, or Centauri in a setting with action and intrigue just before and during the first season of Babylon 5.

== Publication history ==
Shannon Appelcline, in his book Designers & Dragons, noted that while this game was short-lived, it was the first role-playing game based on Babylon 5, with the second being Babylon 5 Roleplaying Game by Mongoose Publishing.

== Reviews ==
- Valkyrie #14 (1997)
- Pyramid #25 (May/June, 1997)
- Shadis #34 (1996)
- Dragon #251 (Sept., 1998)
- Backstab #4
- Dragão Brasil #35
- InQuest Gamer #26
- Casus Belli #106
- Science Fiction Age
- MARS: Adventures in Miniature (Vol 1. Issue 3 - Summer 1997)
