= Descent: FreeSpace – The Great War =

1998 video game

- Cover art
- Developers: Volition; Hyperion Entertainment (Amiga version)
- Publishers: Interplay Productions; Haage & Partner (Amiga version)
- Designer: Adam Pletcher
- Composer: Dan Wentz
- Platforms: Microsoft Windows, Amiga
- Release: Microsoft Windows: NA: June 5, 1998; EU: 1998; Amiga; December 2001
- Genre: Space combat simulator
- Modes: Single-player, multiplayer

Descent: FreeSpace – The Great War, known as Conflict: FreeSpace – The Great War in Europe, is a 1998 space combat simulation IBM PC compatible computer game developed by Volition, when it was split off from Parallax Software, and published by Interplay Productions. In 2001, it was ported to the Amiga platform as FreeSpace: The Great War by Hyperion Entertainment. The game places players in the role of a human pilot, who operates in several classes of starfighter and combats against opposing forces, either human or alien, in various space-faring environments, such as in orbit above a planet or within an asteroid belt. The story of the game's single player campaign focuses on a war in the 24th century between two factions, one human and the other alien, that is interrupted in its fourteenth year by the arrival of an enigmatic and militant alien race, whose genocidal advance forces the two sides into a ceasefire in order to work together to halt the threat.

Descent: FreeSpace was well-received as a single-player space simulation that integrated all the desired features of its genre, from competent AI wingmen, to the presence of large capital ships that dwarf the fighters piloted by the player and explode spectacularly when destroyed. The game's multiplayer mode was criticised, as it was plagued by lag and inaccurate tracking of statistics. An expansion for the game, which was less well-received, was also released in 1998 under the title of Silent Threat, and focuses on events after the main game's campaign with the player working for an intelligence branch of the Terrans' armed forces that later attempt to overthrow the Terran government. A sequel to Descent: FreeSpace entitled FreeSpace 2, was released in 1999 to critical acclaim.

== Gameplay ==
Descent: FreeSpace features two modes of play; a single player campaign and multiplayer matches, with the game's main menu designed around the interior of a ship's quarterdeck, with various elements (mostly doors) leading to different options, such as starting a new game, configuring the game, reviewing the crafts featured in the game and various story elements, and replaying completed single player missions. In both modes, the player controls their craft and other commands through either a joystick, or a keyboard (either on its own or with a mouse), and primarily view the game's environments from the first-person perspective of a cockpit within a starfighter. While the game features additional third-person camera viewpoints, the game's interface—the head-up display (HUD)—can only be viewed from the primary viewpoint, and can be customised with different colours. Because of the flexibility in the control scheme, some have categorised the game as being a flight simulator, since it has more controls and commands than a typical arcade game, yet its flight model is simple, and incorporates some elements of Newtonian physics such as precise collision physics.

The HUD-only interface of the game provides detailed information for players. The targeting system is currently set to automatically track the closest hostile target when the system is not tracking anything

When conducting a match or a single-player mission, players rely on the HUD of their craft to provide information for them. This includes: the state of their craft and its shields, the amount of energy for primary weapons and the craft's afterburners (both recharge over time), along with management of sub-systems and which primary and secondary weapons are being used; overall damage taken on the player's craft and sub-systems (the latter repairs over time, unless destroyed); information on both allied and hostile craft being targeted, displayed in the lower-left corner of the HUD, including their condition and condition of sub-systems, speed, and their distance to the player's own craft; a warning system that alerts the player about incoming enemy missiles; and an in-game radar that tracks all craft in the area around them (green for allies, red for enemies, and blue for craft entering or leaving the area). In single-player missions, the HUD also displays the condition of any wingmen the player has supporting them, represented by a circle that changes to a darker colour when the craft has taken critical damage and becomes an outline when the wingman has either departed or be killed in action, along with an "Escort" list that keeps track of notable vessels that the player either must escort or destroy, the number next to the vessel's name indicating how much hull integrity they have. The game features a flexible targeting system that works in conjunction with the HUD, allowing the player to track any craft around them or in front of them, as well as hostiles and any craft marked in the Escort list. While the player has full manual control of the system, they can also opt to have it automatically track the nearest hostile target, as well have their craft match its current target's speed through the targeting system.

The starfighters available for use to the player in both modes, fall under several roles: space superiority, assault, recon, interceptor and bomber. Each type of craft available in the game for use, vary in speed, shielding, manoeuvrability, and the number of weapon banks available for primary and secondary weapons; the carrying capacity for secondary weapons also varies between crafts. Primary weapons cover guns that vary in damage and firing rate, and which drain the weapon energy banks of a starfighter when continuously used, with some specifically designed to do damage to either shields, hull, or subsystems. Secondary weapons cover missiles and bombs, each designed to be either a "dumb-fire", heat-seeking, or aspect-seeking projectile in combat. In both modes, the player can choose what craft they use and which weapons it is armed with, while in battle, they can opt to switch to between which primary weapons they use (provided the craft has more than one gun mount), as well as switch between secondary weapons and firing between single or double rounds. Along with weapons, each craft carries a set amount of countermeasures which can be used, along with skillful manoeuvring, to avoid incoming missiles. Along with control over weapons, players can alter their craft's main sub-systems—Weapons, Shields and Engines—via an energy management system, which dynamically affects their efficiency as a result; altering the energy level of the engines, affects their craft's maximum speed and the amount of energy available for its afterburners. Players also have access to a communication system that can be used to call in a support craft to repair destroyed sub-systems and re-arm secondary weapons, while in single-player mode, it can be used to call in reinforcements (if available) and direct wingmen (either a single craft, a wing, or all craft, depending on how many are still active) to either engage a player's target, engage all hostiles, protect a target, or depart from the battle.

=== Single-player ===
In the game's single-player mode, players take on the role of a Terran pilot in the game's main campaign, who engages in a series of mission that become increasingly challenging as they progress into the game's main storyline; the difficulty of this campaign can be changed by the player, in between missions. Apart from other starfighters, the campaign sees the player sometimes encountering other vessels—cruisers, destroyers, medical ships, science vessels, transports, freighters and escape pods—along with stationary turrets, cargo containers, and large space-station installations, either friendly or hostile. To ease players into the various controls of the game, training missions are included in the campaign, mixed in between regular missions, that gradually introduce the player to advanced commands and techniques. For each mission that is undertaken, the player is given a briefing that details the relevant information pertaining to its circumstances and the objectives that are expected to be completed, although such briefings do not detail actual situations and objectives the player will face; in between some mission, a command briefing is given prior to a mission's briefing, outlying the current situation of the campaign, as well as details on new ships and weapons the player may use. To complete a mission and subsequently unlock the next one, players must meet a number of objectives defined for it and survive long enough to receive clearance to return to base; not all objectives can be completed, as some are scripted to be failed as part of the campaign's story. If a player dies on a mission, or fail to complete vital objectives (i.e. protecting an important ship), players can restart a mission and try it again. While objectives are not listed, the player is given a list of directives in their HUD, detailing what they must do (i.e. destroying a target(s)); multiple targets of a directive include numbers in brackets, which decreases when targets are destroyed or depart, while directives that are completed turn blue, and those failed turn red.

Before committing to a mission in the campaign, players are given control to denote what craft and weapons are used by both themselves and the wingmen they have control over at the start of the mission, which adds an element of strategy to the campaign, though what ships and weapons are available depend upon what stage of the campaign the player is on. Not all missions allow the load-out to be changed—in some missions, it is fixed; in others, it is whatever the player had for themselves and their wingmen from the previous mission, including the conditions their crafts were in. Once a mission is completed, the player receives a debriefing which outlays the result of the player's actions and what could have been done better; players can get a hint, defined as "Recommendations" in the game, that can detail what exactly they could do to improve their performance in the mission, and have the ability to restart a mission in order to approach it differently. In some missions, the results of the player's action can often affect later missions: for example, an enemy capital ship allowed to flee in a particular mission may return in a later mission. Players can earn medals in the campaign, either by completing specific missions, or completing hidden bonus objectives, along with promotions based on kills—each kill earns points depending on the type of craft destroyed, with the amount affected by the difficulty the player is set at—and badges based on total number of kills made. Any mission completed in the campaign, can be played again through in-game mission simulator found in the game's main menu. In addition to the game's standard campaign, the player may also make their own missions and campaigns through the use of a free editor bundled with the game, the FreeSpace Editor (FRED for short). Players can make their own missions, with the ability to import personal audio and 3D animation files.

=== Multiplayer ===
In the game's multiplayer mode, players compete in multiplayer matches online or over a local area network (LAN), in which they can band together to complete cooperative missions, or split up into teams to battle against one another. At the time the game was released, online gameplay was free over the services offered by Parallax Online, which also kept track of players' statistics and rankings, while voice chat is available, although reviewers advised it to be used only on broadband or LAN.

== Plot ==
=== Main campaign ===
==== Setting ====
Sketches of the three main races of the game: Vasudans (top left), Shivans (right), Terrans (bottom left)

The setting of the game takes place in the 24th century when humanity has discovered interstellar travel through the use of interstellar subspace jump nodes that function in the same manner as wormholes, allowing it to spread out across the stars and colonise new worlds. Prior to the game beginning, humanity (referred to as Terrans) formed the Galactic Terran Alliance (GTA) as the central power of all of their systems' governments and military, and became engaged in a war over systems and resources against the Vasudans of the Parliamentary Vasudan Empire (PVE). By the time the story begins, this war has entered its fourteenth year, as a third species, dubbed Shivans, makes an unprovoked attack on the Terran system of Ross 128. The player, acting as a new Terran pilot in the GTA, is initially involved in the conflict with the PVE before the fights focus on the new species' arrival and subsequent assaults.

Vasudans are represented as carbon-based biped, who are taller than humans, and have a durable biological system and a skeletal-looking physical appearance, while Shivans appear insect-like in appearance, with multiple legs and eyes and the capability of walking on walls and ceilings. A fourth race, dubbed "The Ancients", is not shown in the game but referenced during the single-player story as having lived thousands of years ago and having once held an empire in the systems controlled by the Vasudans and Terrans, before they were driven to extinction by the Shivans. In the game, each race's ships bear distinctive appearances and are named after notable aspects of Earth's history, religious text, and mythologies: Terran craft have a plain but practical design that is easy to mass-produce, with military ships named after figures in Greek, Norse and religious mythology, and science craft named after noted figures of science; Vasudan craft are artistic with sleek lines and curves, and are named after ancient Egyptian myths and locations; Shivan ships are pointy and asymmetrical in insidious black and red colours, and are named after fictional, reptilian species, demons and figures in various religious text.

==== Plot ====
In 2335, on the fourteenth year of the Terran–Vasudan war, a lone GTA pilot scrambles to warn of an impending new threat, after forces from the GTA and PVE are destroyed by an unknown race, but is killed shortly after arriving in the Ross 128 system along with all GTA assets within the system. Unable to find evidence of a new race in the aftermath of the attack, GTA command covers up the incident as best as possible, disclosing it as an unsubstantiated rumour, as GTA forces co-ordinate an offensive manoeuvre on contested systems held by the PVE. During one such engagement in the Antares system, GTA forces are forced to recover prototypes of a new weapon system stolen by one of its officers, Lt. Alexander McCarthy, who had gone rogue; during his capture, he proclaims that there is a far greater threat to both sides. Shortly after the PVE begins to lose control of Antares, the unknown race strikes both GTA and PVE forces, devastating both sides. In the aftermath of the attack, both sides call a ceasefire to contend with the new race, dubbed as "Shivans".

Finding that the Shivans have two distinct advantages – their ships cannot be tracked by current sensor systems, while their smaller craft withstand current weapon system through the use of a shielding system – the GTA and PVE launch an ambitious raid on Shivan cargo depots to rectify this, acquiring components and data that allow them to even the odds. Despite the ceasefire coming into effect after the operation, a Vasudan death cult called "The Hammer of Light" (HoL), who worship the Shivans, launches attacks against both GTA and PVE forces. Contending with HoL forces, combined GTA-PVE forces soon begin making use of shielding technology in their fighters and bombers, and strike back at Shivan targets, eventually leading to the successful capture of a Shivan cruiser, the Taranis. However, celebrations on its capture are short-lived when a Shivan super-destroyer, dubbed the Lucifer, tracks down the ship, destroying it and many other allied ships. To the shock of the new alliance, the Lucifer is found to possess a powerful shield system that makes it immune to all conventional weaponry, thus allowing the Shivans to spearhead its invasion towards the homeworlds of the Vasudans and Terrans.

Realising that the Vasudan's homeworld will be hit first, GTA-PVE forces prepare to counter the invasion, despite interference by HoL forces. To prepare for this, the alliance makes use of a captured Shivan fighter to scan incoming Shivan ships preparing an assault on the Vasuda system. Despite managing to destroy a Shivan destroyer during the eventual invasion, the GTA loses one of its own destroyers, the Galatea, to the Lucifer's weaponry. Having obliterated all opposition, the Lucifer subsequently bombards the Vasudans' home-planet, causing several billion casualties in the process. In the aftermath of the incident, GTA-PVE forces launch a rescue mission to recover surviving refugees from Shivan forces.

With the Shivans now beginning to encroach on the Terrans' homeworld in the Sol system, the alliance receives unexpected news of a discovery that had been made in the Altair system, by a refugee fleet that had been forced to land on an uncharted planet within the system. Investigating this, the alliance uncover remnants of a long-extinct alien civilisation on the planet, dubbed "the Ancients", who had amassed a vast galactic empire several thousands of years ago, before the Shivans wiped them out. Uncovering data within the remains of this civilisation, the Alliance discovers that, prior to their destruction, the Ancients had developed the technology to track ships in subspace, and had discovered that the Shivans' shield technology doesn't work in subspace, a flaw that also exists within the Lucifer's own shields.

Armed with this knowledge, the alliance launches a desperate assault to stop the super-destroyer as it prepares to enter the jump node to Sol from the Delta Serpentis system. A small task-force of fighter and bomber squadrons follows the Lucifer into subspace and destroys the vessel as it emerges into the Sol system. Its destruction causes the Sol jump node to collapse, cutting off Earth from the rest of the galaxy. The GTA and PVE celebrate a pyrrhic victory, as the "Great War" finally comes to an end, with the Vasudan homeworld devastated and the Terran homeworld isolated.

In an epilogue, a narrator speculates the Shivans were not necessarily evil, stating that they were "great destroyers but also the great preservers", and that their role was to exterminate other species who advanced beyond their ordained place in the cosmic order; the Ancients were targeted as they subdued or annihilated countless other species in building their vast empire. The narrator postulates that had it not been for the Shivans' intervention, the Ancients would have likely grown too powerful for the Terrans and Vasudans to survive against, and thus theorises that the Terrans' expansion would have made them a threat to any other fledgling species.

=== Silent Threat expansion ===
==== Setting ====
The setting of the expansion takes place after the events of the "Great War", with both the GTA and PVE working together to rebuild their systems and deal with the remnants of the Shivan Armada. In the story, players assume the role of a pilot from the GTA, who has recently joined one of the fleets for Galactic Terran Intelligence (GTI), the GTA's intelligence service, which consists of three branches: Research & Development (R&D), Intelligence, and Special Operations. The player's character is assigned as a pilot for Special Operations during the storyline.

==== Plot ====
Following the end of the "Great War", both the GTA and the PVE attempt to focus on the rebuilding of their systems and dealing with the remnants of the Shivan forces, although the alliance between them is in a fragile state. In order to ensure the alliance does not collapse, GTA command assigns the GTI to the task of preserving it, while assisting in protecting valuable research projects and dealing with the remaining Shivan forces. During engagements, a science vessel that had been recorded as being officially destroyed during the war with the Shivans, the Einstein, turns up during an operation to protect Vasudan craft. Although the crew escape before the vessel is destroyed, suspicions surrounding the science vessel's appearance are aroused, when recovery of the ship's escapes pods is compounded by confusion in communications that lead to two of the GTI's destroyers, the Krios and the Repulse, arriving and claiming to be there to recover the pods; the latter later proves they were assigned to this responsibility.

As the GTA and PVE launch further attacks on the Shivans, it is quickly discovered that what is left is unorganised, leading the alliance to co-ordinate a full invasion of their main strongholds, as other systems they occupied slowly return under Terran and Vasudan control. But as the last remaining threat from the Shivans is crushed, officers in the highest echelons of the GTI effect an attempt to cover-up plans for a coup against the GTA by going after the Krios, the only ship aware of the plot and thus a threat to their plans. The pilots sent out by the Krios during the final fight with the Shivans, return early, arriving in time to discover the treason and alert GTA command. Realising that much of the GTI has gone rogue and are fighting against the alliance, remnants of the GTI still loyal to the GTA is merged with its battle-groups and begins conducting operations to bring down the ringleaders, including the capture of the Repulse.

Shortly after destroying the GTI's headquarters, the alliance discovers that a crippling attack against a Vasudan destroyer, the Hope, which had been maintaining a blockade against GTI forces, was conducted by a super-destroyer created by the GTI's R&D branch, designated the Hades. Investigations into its origins reveals that the GTI had known about the Shivans much earlier than the GTA and PVE during the "Great War", and that the Einstein was officially declared as destroyed in order to observe the species without interference. The Hades was planned for the war against the Vasudans until the ceasefire was put into effect by the GTA and the PVE; thus the GTI assisted in the war, only to eliminate the Shivan threat while utilising the race's technology that it had uncovered to further enhance the super-destroyer. Their rebellion was designed in order to overthrow the GTA government and dissolve the treaty with the Vasudans; the Krios destruction was because the head of Special Operations had unearthed the plot after managing to get details from some of the crew of the Einstein. Seeking to destroy it, GTA-PVE forces launch a massive assault on the Hades, and manage against the odds to destroy the vessel, ending the rebellion, and further cementing the alliance between the two species, as they resume their work to rebuilding their systems.

== Development ==
FreeSpace was Volition's first project after the split from Parallax Software, which also spawned Outrage Entertainment. It is not part of the canon of the Descent video game series, and contained none of its ideas and only small portions of its code. It was only prefixed with Descent to avoid trademark issues with Mijenix Corporation's "FreeSpace", a disk compression utility. Volition also used the term "FreeSpace" in the game to initially describe what became later known as subspace. The game was conceived by Adam Pletcher, with all the features of space simulator games his team had found to be fun. The games TIE Fighter and Wing Commander were their primary inspirations, and those influences made their way into the game's flight model, along with the influence of historical World War II dogfights. Themes from the fiction of Star Wars, Space: Above and Beyond, and Ender's Game form a part in shaping the background and story of the FreeSpace world. The chaotic battles between masses of ships commonly found in science fiction anime became one of the features of FreeSpace.

Begun with a crew of five, the project grew to a staff of 17. The game's code was built from scratch. Most of the software modules were interlinked with each other, increasing the job's complexity and difficulty. The code incorporated small portions of Descent's code for specific functions. Mike Kulas, who had worked on several versions of Flight Simulator and Descent, brought his experience into the game's artificial intelligence (AI). The game's difficulty levels are based on advancing the enemy AI, rather than simply increasing damage and "hit points" of enemies. Some realism was incorporated into the game's physics, such that an impact on one part of a starfighter's body will send it spinning appropriately, unlike sphere-based collision detection, in which an impact would simply 'push' the starfighter in a particular direction. Due to time and budget constraints, many of the initially planned cutscenes and stories were cut from the final product. Examples of such cuts include a campaign path where the Terran-Vasudan alliance goes on a retreat, and scenes of racial tension within the alliance. Despite the promise of a deathmatch mode for multiplayer, it was cut from the final product. The expansion Silent Threat also suffered the same fate of cuts due to budgetary and time concerns.

Apogee Software announced on December 12, 1997 that they would be publishing FreeSpace for the first three months before handing the publishing rights back to Interplay Entertainment. This was part of their agreement with Interplay for the latter's purchase of the rights to Descent, and Apogee decided to release FreeSpace as shareware, with themselves as the merchant of the registered version. Interplay, however, bought the full rights to FreeSpace from Apogee in late April 1998, keeping the ownership of the game solely to themselves.

Volition aimed for a quality release, and promised to deliver a product without major bugs. Minor bugs would be fixed in a prompt manner. The shipped game had deficiencies admitted by the team, such as problems with the multiplayer code, and a few design issues. The game underwent four patches, which resolved most of the bugs, and improved the multiplayer performance. Complaints about an online mission giving unfair scores led to Volition removing the mission from scoring play. Another patch allowed EAX capability to be enabled for Creative Sound Blaster sound cards. Interplay played its part in drumming up the community's interest by holding contests, and expanding material for the FreeSpace universe. Meanwhile, Volition created official star maps, and released Vasudan voice clips and story development notes. Interplay hired science-fiction writers such as Fred Saberhagen, Simon Hawke, and Jeff Grubb to write weekly FreeSpace stories for two months. Preparing for Silent Threat's release, Interplay held a contest from July 28 to August 25, 1998, in which the submitted fan-designed missions could win their authors prizes such as free copies of Silent Threat, FreeSpace apparel, and gaming hardware. Entries were judged by a panel from PC Gamer, and qualified entries constituted half of the missions in Silent Threat.

On December 14, 1999, Hyperion Entertainment made acquisition of the license to port FreeSpace to the Amiga system. The publisher was changed to Haage & Partner Computer on October 18, 2001. Despite the game's official release being announced for December 2001, the approval to do so could only be gotten on January 7, 2002. The game was shipped without a printed manual, but had additional German and French language support. Hyperion had stated they would port over Silent Threat if the FreeSpace port sold well. To date, Silent Threat has yet to be ported over to the Amiga platform.

== Reception ==
Reception

Aggregate score
Aggregator	Score
GameRankings	82.0%

Review scores
Publication	Score
AllGame	4 / 5
Computer and Video Games	8.9 / 10
GamePro	4.5 / 5
GameRevolution	A−
GameSpot	8.9 / 10
Next Generation	4/5
Total Amiga	5 / 5

A Terran Capital ship breaking up in its destruction; the effects used to create it received unanimous praise from reviewers

PC Data, which tracked computer game sales in the United States, reported that Descent: FreeSpace earned nearly $4 million and sold around 100,000 copies by October 1999.

Next Generation reviewed the PC version of the game, rating it four stars out of five, and stated that "overall, despite a few minor lapses, Descent Freespace: The Great War is definitely a keeper. Although it is too similar, especially in its controls, to other space sims [...] to be considered 'revolutionary', it does take the space-combat simulation genre one step further".

Descent: FreeSpace received generally good reviews following its launch, with PC Gamer UK placing it 20th in its 1999 Top 100 Awards. Reviewers were split on several aspects of the game. While many praised the graphics of the game, some approving of how well rendered an in-game asteroid stood out before the background of softly glowing nebulae, galaxies and stars, others felt the 3D effects were not "spectacular" to those of the software rendered version, commenting that rendered nebulae were unconvincing and that the models of in-game ships lacked detail and had blurry textures. Despite the differences between them, all reviewers unanimously agreed that the explosions effects in the game, including the many small details of the capital ships upon breaking up, were the most impressive they had seen (at the time).

Other splits included comparisons between the game and that of Wing Commander: Prophecy and X-Wing vs. TIE Fighter; while some felt the game combined elements of both with better qualities and a strong story, others felt it had simply taken inspiration from space simulation classics, offered very little in original ideas, lacked depth in the story, with some suggesting the player could have had a greater role in the outcome of the game's story, and that they were simply playing a "very sweet looking arcade title" with considerable detachment from some of the game's elements. Despite the splits in opinion, many felt the game's AI was well designed, from the wingmen being competent and performing orders without issues, to the enemy vessels acting in concert with each other during missions, yet one reviewer was dismayed that the game's screen size was fixed and could not be changed.

Much criticism was made of the game's multiplayer mode. Despite a reviewer giving a glowing praise to it over cable modems, the majority, who played it over dial-up access, roundly condemned it. Many chiefly complained about lag in the game; some found themselves facing a similar situation in which the ship's gun fired only seconds after they depressed the trigger and that their ship randomly jumped over the multiplayer battlegrounds, while one reviewer called the mode "bug ridden" after finding many of their shots did not register hits or kills on enemy ships after over 40 minutes of play. One reviewer on GameSpot questioned the game's claims it could support 16 players online when they found it couldn't support just two over a 56k modem.

The game's expansion Silent Threat, received generally less favourable reviews. Its stand-alone missions were complemented well for being conceived as part of a contest by the game's developers. Volition put in a call to the FreeSpace community to stop creating "Battle of Endor"-type missions through FRED, and instead create missions based on developer Jason Hoffoss's Zen philosophy of accomplishing more with less. The expansion was judged decent but uninspired, with many noting that the campaign missions lacked variety, and some feeling that the story was worse than the main game due to its "cold and inhuman" briefings and non-player characters.

The Academy of Interactive Arts & Sciences nominated Descent: FreeSpace for "PC Simulation Game of the Year" at the 2nd Annual Interactive Achievement Awards, although it lost to Need for Speed III: Hot Pursuit. Descent: FreeSpace was a finalist for Computer Games Strategy Plus's "Sci-Fi Simulation of the Year" and Computer Gaming World's "Best Space Sim" awards in 1998, both of which ultimately went to I-War. The editors of Computer Gaming World called it "an excellent game, featuring some of the best wing-man AI to hit the genre, but it was too derivative of previous space sims". PC Gamer US nominated it as the year's best action game, and its editors wrote that "Freespace came from nowhere to wrest the 3D space combat crown from the Wing Commander series with style". However, this award went to Tom Clancy's Rainbow Six.
