= FreeSpace 2 =

1999 space combat simulation computer game

- Developer: Volition
- Publisher: Interplay Entertainment
- Designers: Dave Baranec; Jason Scott; Adam Pletcher
- Programmer: Dave Baranec
- Artist: Jasen Whiteside
- Writers: Jason Scott; Mike Breault
- Composers: Dan Wentz; Scott Lee
- Platform: Windows
- Release: NA: September 30, 1999; EU: October 8, 1999; AU: October 21, 1999
- Genre: Space combat simulator
- Modes: Single-player, multiplayer

FreeSpace 2 is a 1999 space combat simulation video game developed by Volition as the sequel to Descent: FreeSpace – The Great War. It was completed ahead of schedule in less than a year, and released to very positive reviews, but the game became a commercial failure, and was described by certain critics as one of 1999's most unfairly overlooked titles.

The game continues on the story from Descent: FreeSpace, once again thrusting the player into the role of a pilot fighting against the mysterious aliens, the Shivans. While defending the human race and its alien Vasudan allies, the player also gets involved in putting down a rebellion. The game features large numbers of fighters alongside gigantic capital ships in a battlefield fraught with beams, shells and missiles in detailed star systems and nebulae. Free multiplayer games were available via Parallax Online which also ranked players by their statistics. A persistent galaxy was also available as SquadWar for players to fight with each other over territories.

In 2002, Volition released the source code for the game engine under a non-commercial license. This code became the core of the FreeSpace 2 Source Code Project, which continuously improves it and enables new features. In cooperation with the FreeSpace Upgrade Project the game's graphics are kept up to date. The improved game engine is also used by various mod projects, for example The Babylon Project and Diaspora which are based on the science fiction series Babylon 5 and Battlestar Galactica respectively.

== Gameplay ==
A corvette and a destroyer attacking each other with beam cannons

FreeSpace 2's gameplay involves the player piloting a starfighter using mounted weapons to destroy enemy starfighters, performing reconnaissance behind enemy lines, or escorting other starships. Its flight model is based on a looser interpretation of space physics instead of realistic Newtonian physics. Hence, the ships are weightless and feel more responsive, though they require constant application of engine power to move. The result is that the game plays more like a "WWII dogfight simulator" unaffected by gravity. Although joysticks are the recommended controller for this game, the mouse is a viable alternative.

The pre-mission briefing stage is where the player gets information on the background and objectives, and selects the ship and weapons. The choices of ships and weapons increase as the player proceeds further along the campaign. Certain missions, however, will dictate certain ships and weapons to be used. Weapons can be classified into primary weapons and secondary weapons.

The player flies around in a fighter with a first-person, in-cockpit view with a fully customizable fixed head-up display (HUD) as the visual interface. The HUD displays video communications and relevant data on the ship's status and performance, weapons, objectives, and targets. It can also warn players if missiles are locking onto them and from which direction, thus becoming an aid for launching countermeasures or taking evasive maneuvers. Players have to maneuver into position and shoot through both shields and hull to destroy enemy ships. While hull damage is unrecoverable, shields recharge over time. With the game supporting force feedback technology, joystick players will find their controllers vibrating or putting up resistance when they engage the afterburners or collide with objects. Similarly, certain events, such as engaging afterburners and firing powerful weapons, will shake the screen as a form of visual feedback.

FreeSpace 2 has many helpful features available. The player can target enemies attacking a protected objective or match speeds with them. Power can be shunted between shields, engines, and weapons, thereby allowing faster recharge of shields, afterburners, and weapons at the expense of other subsystems. These features can be ignored without any detrimental effects on gameplay. The mission parameters are not rigidly fixed, as there is an allowance for the failures of some primary objectives.

FreeSpace 2 allows multiplayer games to be played across a local area network (LAN) or over the Internet via the free services provided by Parallax Online (PXO). The player can communicate with the other network players vocally through FreeSpace 2's own voice chat capability. LAN play allows the players to play the standard player versus player modes such as deathmatch, or cooperate to complete multiplayer missions. They can even join in games which are already underway. The same can be done over PXO but with the added incentive of having the players' statistics of kills and deaths being tracked on a ladder (ranking) system.

== Plot and setting ==
FreeSpace 2 takes place entirely in outer space. The playing area is vast when compared to the small starfighters piloted by the player and the effective range they have. This space is populated with interstellar bodies such as stars, planets, asteroids, etc. The implementation of nebulae as an interactive environment is one of the most distinctive aspects of FreeSpace 2. Flying through a nebula involves impaired vision, and occasional disruptions to flight electronics. Nebulae have become known as an eerie and suspenseful arena of play.

Journeys between star systems are achieved by "jumping" through jump nodes and traveling through subspace, while shorter intra-system distances are done by "hopping" into subspace at any time. All ships in a mission either "jump" or "hop" to make their entries and exits. The game's starship designs are clearly distinguishable between the three races. Terran starships tend to be plain and practical, the Vasudans' starships are artistic with sleek lines and curves, and the enemies' ships—the Shivans—are sharp, pointy and asymmetrical in insidious black and red colors.

FreeSpace 2's story is brought out via narrative pre-rendered cutscenes, the pre- and post-mission briefings, as well as in-game chatter between non-player characters, and scripted mission events. The structure for the story is linear without any branching paths for alternate storylines, though there are optional covert missions which can further flesh out the story. The story can only be continued by clearing missions and progressing through the campaign. However, players are given the option to skip a mission if they have failed it five times in a row.

=== Characters ===
The player takes the role of a pilot in the ranks of the Galactic Terran–Vasudan Alliance (GTVA). While the appearance and name of the pilot can be customized by the player, the player never gets to personally interact with other characters in the game. The pilot is also never shown in the game's cinematics or any other media.

Just like the player's pilot, most of the other characters are low-key. The non-player character Admiral Aken Bosch, however, plays a crucial part in moving the story. As a prominent antagonist from the start, he sparks off a rebellion which escalates the scale of action, and brings in the other antagonist force, the Shivans, into the story. The storytelling took on a character-driven approach with expositions taking the form of cutscenes in which Bosch gives out monologues, revealing the purpose and driving forces behind his actions. A few established voice actors were brought in to give a polished touch to the voices in the game. Academy Award nominee Robert Loggia voiced the player's commanding officer, Admiral Petrarch, and Admiral Bosch was voiced by Ronny Cox. Kurtwood Smith and Stephen Baldwin participated in bit roles as well.

=== Story ===
The game begins 32 years after the events in Descent: FreeSpace. Following the end of the Great War, both the GTA and PVE cemented their alliance by combining together to form the Galactic Terran–Vasudan Alliance (GTVA)—a single entity formed to cement the alliance between the Terran and Vasudan races after the destruction of Vasuda Prime by the Lucifer and the subsequent collapse of all subspace nodes to the Sol system as a result of the superdestroyer's destruction inside the Sol–Delta Serpentis jump node. Despite this alliance, opposition still exists to this union in the form of a faction of Terrans led by Great War veteran, Admiral Aken Bosch, who leads the rebel group under the banner of the Neo-Terran Front (NTF). The NTF's rebellion led to the faction gaining control over the Sirius, Polaris and Regulus star systems, while engaging the GTVA for 18 months, before launching attacks on the Vasudan systems of Deneb and Alpha Centauri.

Seeking to stop the NTF from securing Deneb, the GTVA launch a campaign in the star system, though they are shocked to find Bosch within. An effort to stop him fails badly, and so the GTVA focus on securing the star system, with great success. Just as further engagements against the NTF are about to commence, an incident in the Gamma Draconis system leads to the 3rd Fleet of the GTVA being reassigned to the star system, where they learn that the Shivans have returned, along with the discovery of an artificial jump gate that leads to Shivan space. After securing the device and passing through it, the GTVA discover a nebula along with more Shivans, and a cruiser of the NTF, the Trinity. Despite efforts to secure and recover the cruiser, the Trinity is destroyed, and the GTVA fleet focus on dealing with the Shivans, before returning to Gamma Draconis for reassignment.

The NTF rebellion soon becomes the focus of attention once again after attacks intensify, eventually leading the GTVA to quell an attack on a space station with their latest ship, the enormous capital ship GTVA Colossus. Dwarfing all other capital ships, this juggernaut-class ship's power proves more than a match to many NTF ships, defeating a major officer in the rebellion. Seeking to capitalize on this, the GTVI (Galactic Terran–Vasudan Intelligence) organise an operation with their SOC (Special Operation Command) to investigate and uncover information on Bosch's ETAK project, which is nearly wrecked when a Vasudan admiral attempts to hit Bosch's flagship, the Iceni. Following the latest campaign against the NTF, GTVA forces re-engage Shivan forces in the nebula, using new technology to destroy an enemy Ravana-class destroyer. The 3rd Fleet soon return to GTVA space, where Bosch launches an assault to get the NTF to the Jump Gate. While the NTF loses many ships, the Iceni escapes with Bosch on board. While pursuing Bosch into the nebula, the GTVA are sidetracked by having to destroy a juggernaut-class Shivan warship, the Sathanas.

The Alliance Fleet resumes its efforts to track down Bosch, and discover that Bosch had built a device that enables him to communicate with the Shivans, which was the purpose of ETAK; the Alliance realise the jump gate was activated by Bosch, who had been stealing artefacts from archaeological sites looking into the Ancients, and had been hoping to meet and contact the Shivans. The Shivans respond to his transmission, and in turn board the Iceni, capturing him and fifteen other crewmen before attempting to destroy it. The GTVA manage to save the surviving crew and the ETAK device, but as they try to intercept the Shivan transport carrying Bosch, they discover a second jump gate in the nebula. The Alliance destroyer, the GVD Psamtik, attempts to secure the jump gate, but is destroyed by another Sathanas juggernaut shortly afterwards, forcing the GTVA to pull out. During this time, the GTVI and SOC launch a secret operation, discovering the threat posed to the GTVA by the Shivans is much greater than they had thought.

The Alliance devises a plan to halt the Shivan invasion by collapsing the two jump nodes from Capella to the rest of GTVA space. The plan works, but the GTVA loses the Colossus, their only match for Shivan juggernauts, in a diversionary engagement, resulting in a pyrrhic victory. The Shivans cause the Capella star to go supernova, destroying the fighting GTVA and Shivans there. The player can choose to flee the scene when the warning is given or stay and die defending the remaining ships, which affects the ending slightly. In the ending cutscene, the player's commanding officer, Admiral Petrarch, delivers a speech about everything the Alliance has lost, speculating on the nature of the Shivans and why they destroyed Capella, and if the player decides to stay, a small tribute is paid to the player's heroic actions as Petrarch informs his wingmen of his sacrifice. The Admiral concludes by saying that the Alliance now has the means to recreate the Ancient subspace gate, implying that there's a chance the node to Earth can be restored and that this conflict didn't bring only sorrow, before signing off.

== Development ==
The news of FreeSpace 2 being in development was confirmed in a chat on November 6, 1998. FreeSpace 2 was developed in less than one year. The Volition team revealed they had written up a story and will be targeting high-end hardware with dogfights for a greater number of ships and even larger and more deadly capital ships. The team set themselves the goals of setting new standards for both single-player and multiplayer space combat simulations, and started to modify the FreeSpace game engine for FreeSpace 2. This team was the same team which had worked on Descent: FreeSpace, plus several new members. In order to flesh out the story, Volition hired Jason Scott as a full-time writer before work even started. The linear mission structure was adopted as it was decided it would help the immersion factor of the story greatly.

Due to time constraints, a lot of the initial ideas were dropped from the final version of the game, such as atmospheric battles, and new weapons types like a "subspace missile artillery strike". The team made major improvements to the same FreeSpace engine from the first game. By revamping the core of the graphical engine, and adding 32-bit support, they sped up the interface screens and graphic processing. Hardware acceleration for the graphics was also decided to be a requirement to target the high-end machines of 1999. This allowed for a greater number of ships visibly active on the battlefield, satisfying the team's penchant of having great numbers of fighters and capitals ships duking it out in a big battlefield, instead of "multiple small-ass" battles. The shifting of their target focus to higher end machines also fulfilled their top priority of having capital ships many times larger than fighter crafts. The team also followed real world concepts for some of their designs. The Pegasus stealth fighter was modeled on the stealth technology of the 1990s for people to relate to it easily. The game was restrained from becoming too realistic by the team's recognition that most gamers only want believable worlds to have a blast flying around in and blowing things up.

Compared to the graphical changes, the artificial intelligence (AI) of the computer-controlled characters was only slightly changed. The justification given was that the team felt the AI worked very well for the first game. All they had to do was to tweak it a little and fix some bugs. There was, however, a lot of work done in improving the multiplayer portion of the game. For FreeSpace 2, the player's personal computer was assigned a greater role in predicting the possible consequences for other players' actions. This reduced the amount of data needed to be transferred between the computers, which would result in a smoother playing experience. Beta testers were recruited to stress test and troubleshoot the multiplayer mode as well. SquadWar was implemented as an attempt to establish a sense of continuity among the players in the form of a persistent online territorial fight, along with pilot statistics and ladder rankings. Volition hoped this concept would help to establish a strong, online community and build up the game's lifespan.

FreeSpace 2 was released on September 30, 1999, one month ahead of schedule, although the team had to quickly come up with and release a patch (version 1.01) for a software bug which prevented recognition of a CD during the installation process. Three months later, they released the next and final patch (version 1.20) to fix several other bugs. The release of FreeSpace 2 was considerably muted compared to its predecessor Descent: FreeSpace.

Despite Volition's interest and desire to develop add-ons and expansions for FreeSpace 2, Interplay told them to stop. Volition was then acquired by THQ in 2000. As Interplay owns the rights to the FreeSpace series (as well as the Descent series), and THQ was only interested in pursuing development on what they own, Volition was unable to continue developing the FreeSpace franchise. Faced with source code which became practically useless to them, Volition released the source code for only game engines to the public under a noncommercial license on April 25, 2002. Mike Kulas, the President of Volition, said this was to give those outside the game industry a chance to look at the code of a commercial software product, a desire he and Matt Toschlog had when they were not yet in the industry. In the years since, no sequels to FreeSpace 2 have been made and Interplay has only published a limited re-release of it on February 2, 2004, to commemorate the company's 20th anniversary. Interplay, by that time, was in financial trouble, failing to pay rent and wages to its workers. Seeking investors to inject it with funds, Interplay changed business strategies: instead of developing and publishing single-player games, it sold licenses to those games and looked towards developing massive multi-player online games. Derek Smart, creator of Battlecruiser 3000AD, had casually mentioned his interest in the Freespace license, but nothing significant came out of this. In 2013, Interplay acquired the remaining rights to the FreeSpace franchise for $7,500 after THQ went to bankruptcy court.

== Reception ==
=== Reviews and awards ===
Reception

Aggregate scores
Aggregator	Score
GameRankings	92.0%
Metacritic	91 / 100

Review scores
Publication	Score
Computer and Video Games	8.5 / 10
Eurogamer	7 / 10
GamePro	5/5
GameSpot	9.4 / 10
GameSpy	92 / 100
IGN	8.9 / 10
Next Generation	5/5
PC Gamer (US)	93%
The Electric Playground	8.5 / 10
FiringSquad	90%

Awards
Publication	Award
PC Player	Best Space Combat Game of 1999
Intelligamer	1999 Sim Game of the Year
CGW	2000 Premier Award Winner
GameSpot	Sci-Fi Simulation of the Year
GamePower	Best Sim of '99
GameSpy	Sim Game of the Year
FiringSquad	Best Action Game of 1999
Computer Games	Sci-Fi Simulation of the Year
PC Player	All Time Top 100 Games
GameSpot	Greatest Games of All Time

The game's backdrops have received high praise from reviewers

FreeSpace 2 has garnered high praise from most established reviewers. FreeSpace 2 received numerous "Game of the Year" awards for 1999, and was nominated for "Computer Simulation Game of the Year" during the 3rd Annual Interactive Achievement Awards. Every review praised FreeSpace 2's graphics. From the ships to the backgrounds, the reviewers were pleased with the details Volition had paid attention to, such as the thematic differences in the ship designs between the races, the textures and clarity of the backdrops, and even the realism of the explosions, though FiringSquad pointed out explosions from torpedo strikes were lower in quality. The nebulae feature was also praised for its rendered atmosphere, which reviewers described as tense and paranoia-inducing as they keep expecting enemy ships to appear out of the gases in a deadly ambush. Even though a couple of reviewers wrote that the nebulae made them dizzy, they still liked the feature. Combatsim even claimed FreeSpace 2 was unrivaled among its space combat peers in the graphics department. The graphical standards were such that when XGP reviewed the Anniversary Edition in 2004, Wehbi found the graphics to stand up quite well to the recent games then.

GameSpot felt FreeSpace's story was "both deeper and darker" than either the Wing Commander and X-Wing series, establishing invincible foes who never lost their stature despite the player learning of plausible ways to defeat them. Game Revolution felt the story was "first rate" for being able to "build several different conflicts into an unforgettable climax", nicely presented by the emphasis of story telling by means of in-game events. While Eurogamer supported the story as intriguing, it also marked down its rating of the game for the way the story was told. The reviewer felt the "just a cog in the machine" story-telling approach left him apathetic towards the non-player characters and missions in the game. FiringSquad, however, said it created a "very believable military atmosphere", which helped to show how things revolve around big events, instead of just around a single person. Combatsim.com offered another angle; Reynolds said the gameplay elements of FreeSpace 2 are "light years beyond the competition" and more than offsets the loss of being personally immersed in the game's universe.

FreeSpace 2's key attraction is its dogfights. CNN.com said the close-ranged dogfights make for engrossing, and exciting skirmishes. FiringSquad described it as a "total thrill" to be among 20 fighters flying in between opposing capital ships with beams, missiles, and flak all around and warnings going off, as they try to seek out and destroy their opposite numbers, a view which GameSpot agreed with. The game's AI was judged adequate to provide for such fights, being cunning enough to trick others to crash into the walls of narrow openings, and good enough to detect and warn their wingmen of enemies coming up directly behind them. There are those who expressed minor disappointments with the AI tending to collide too often with other objects. While the dynamic mission objectives were celebrated for coming up with twists and turns to spice up the story, there were a few who found these "in-game red herrings" overused instead. Sharky Extreme praised FreeSpace 2 for having the enormous capital ships, as this burst the "trapped in a bubble" trend in Wing Commander- and X-Wing- type games. Instead of the action simply coming to the player, it flows all around, and the player is the one who has to go and seek it. The scenes of these giant ships duking it out, with many gnat-like fighters swarming around in their little dances of death, have led reviewers to feel a sense of epicness, comparable to reliving battles in science fiction series like Babylon 5 and Star Wars. Similarly, PC Gamer praised the scaling of ships and battles and said that they "[came] as close to creating the feeling of a World War II naval battle in space as any game has ever come. That's what fighter combat, in space or on Earth, should be all about".

Opinions were generally favorable towards FreeSpace 2's multiplayer implementation. SquadWar received favorable responses from the reviewers who were impressed by its persistent nature and statistics tracking. While the required registration with PXO was considered a troublesome process by a few, the gameplay itself was a smooth experience with no lag at all. Other reviewers' experiences with lag were different. Reynolds of Combatsim.com said Internet gaming was laggy with ships jumping places, but LAN gaming was smooth sailing. GameSpy's reviewer said lag became more apparent on a dial-up connection during a multiplayer mission with four or more players. FiringSquad's reviewer's experience was similar but he said the lag was not enough to hinder his enjoyment of the multiplayer action.

Blake Fischer reviewed the PC version of the game for Next Generation, rating it five stars out of five, and said that "no self-respecting space-combat junkie should live without it".

GameSpot, in electing FreeSpace 2 as one of the "Greatest Games of All Time", pointed out that while most of the game's features could be found in its predecessor or peers, its "sheer quality of presentation and gameplay" was the key reason for their choice. Computer and Video Games has acknowledged it as offering the best dogfighting among the space combat classics. Ars Technica also posed FreeSpace 2 as the last significant stage in evolution of the space combat genre as of 2005.

Fans of the FreeSpace series have created modifications (mods) of FreeSpace 2. The first mods were just custom campaigns, with series of missions created through FRED2, the mission editor freely packaged with FreeSpace 2. One such mod which gained notability was Inferno, which sets its story decades after the conclusion of FreeSpace 2. Released in July 2003, the mod was hosted on established sites, such as GameSpot and CNET, as part of their FreeSpace 2 contents.

=== Sales ===
Despite glowing reviews, FreeSpace 2 was a commercial disappointment. In the United States, it totaled sales of 26,983 copies by the end of 1999, according to PC Data. Writing for Daily Radar, Andrew S. Bub remarked that the game "horrifically" underperformed and was one of the most unfairly overlooked titles of the year. FreeSpace 2 was a runner-up for GameSpot's 1999 "Best Game No One Played" award, which ultimately went to Disciples: Sacred Lands.

FreeSpace 2's sales were acknowledged as disappointing, and described as awful by Kulas. He, however, stated that as the team had stayed within budget by sticking to schedule, Volition should at least be breaking even with the estimated final sales of the game. In NowGamer's interview with Jim Boone, a producer at Volition, he said that this could have been due to joysticks' being sold poorly because they were "going out of fashion" and more modern first-person shooters, such as Quake, were "very much about the mouse and [the] keyboard". He went further on to state: "Before that, when we did Descent for example, it was perfectly common for people to have joysticks – we sold a lot of copies of Descent. It was around that time [when] the more modern FPS with mouse and keyboard came out, as opposed to just keyboard like Wolfenstein [3D] or something".

== Legacy ==
With the release of the game engine's source code, the possibilities of changing the game greatly opened up, and the fan community made use of the code to update the game using recent technology. Led by Edward Gardner and Ian Warfield, the FreeSpace 2 Source Code Project was formed to standardize changes and maintain a core engine for others to take advantage of. Using the new fan-updated engine, projects such as Beyond the Red Line, based on the new Battlestar Galactica, and The Babylon Project, based on Babylon 5, have become possible. PXO, the free Internet gaming service handling SquadWar, was initially acquired by THQ in their 2002 acquisition of Outrage Entertainment (renamed as Outrage Games). The service was continued until July 2003, when Outrage Games was dissolved and PXO terminated. The components of its website were, however, later handed over to the FreeSpace 2 Source Code Project to help them create a similar service in tracking statistics and rankings.
