= George DelHoyo =

American actor

- Born: November 23, 1953 (age 72); Canelones, Uruguay
- Occupation: Actor
- Years active: 1975–present
- Spouse: Deborah May (m. 1983)
- Children: 2

George DelHoyo (born November 23, 1953), also known as George Deloy, is a Uruguayan-born American actor.

== Theatre ==
DelHoyo, who was also raised in Salt Lake City, Utah, began performing in the theatre in New York City during the 1970s. Working under the name George Deloy, he performed in plays and musicals at many of the major American regional theaters such as Seattle Repertory, American Conservatory Theater in San Francisco, Old Globe Theatre in San Diego, Cincinnati Playhouse, Mark Taper Forum in Los Angeles and Huntington Theatre in Boston. His first big break came in 1976, playing Kyle Nunnery in the Broadway musical, The Robber Bridegroom.

== Television ==
In 1978, DelHoyo moved to Los Angeles and became a contract player for Universal Studios, under the screen name George Deloy. Much of his work was in television – one of his first characters was Bert in the episode "Breakout to Murder" of the NBC crime drama series The Eddie Capra Mysteries in 1978, followed in 1979 by the role of Dr. Gilbert Kent on the TV miniseries The Seekers. He starred alongside Brian Dennehy and Katherine Saltzberg in the 1982 sitcom Star of the Family playing sex-crazed Frank Rosetti. In 1986, DelHoyo landed a major role on the soap opera Days of Our Lives, playing the villain Orpheus. During the years of 1989-1991, DelHoyo landed the role of Rob Donnelly on the soap opera Generations. During the 1980s and 1990s he was known primarily as a guest or recurring character on series such as St. Elsewhere, L.A. Law, Nine to Five, Beverly Hills 90210, Walker, Texas Ranger, Home Improvement, Cheers, Frasier, and Superman: The Animated Series. DelHoyo also played the role of a policeman in Tales from the Crypt.

== Games ==
For the 1996 PC video game and PlayStation port Descent, and its sequels Descent II and Descent 3, DelHoyo voiced the protagonist, the Material Defender.

== Voice-over ==
DelHoyo has become noted as a voice-over artist, lending his voice to numerous Hollywood film trailers and network television promos. In 2008 he was featured in the book Secrets of Voice-Over Success by voice actress Joan Baker. The following trailers and promos include:

- Horton Hears a Who! (1970) (2008 DVD reissue trailer only)
- E.T. the Extra-Terrestrial (1982) (2002 reissue trailer/TV Spots only)
- Oliver & Company (1988) (2009 DVD reissue trailer only)
- Batman (1989) (ABC Family promos only)
- FernGully: The Last Rainforest (1992) (2005 DVD reissue trailer only)
- The Swan Princess (1994) (2004 DVD reissue trailer/TV spots only)
- Toy Story (1995) (ABC Family promos only)
- Selena (1997) (TV spot only)
- Wild Things (1998)
- Lost in Space (1998)
- Paulie (1998)
- The Swan Princess III: The Mystery of the Enchanted Treasure (1998) (2004 DVD reissue trailer/TV spots only)
- The Rugrats Movie (1998) (teaser trailer on several 1997 Nickelodeon VHS releases)
- Muppets from Space (1999)
- The Adventures of Elmo in Grouchland (1999)
- Pokémon: The First Movie (1999) (promotion part of the second theatrical trailer only)
- My Dog Skip (2000)
- How the Grinch Stole Christmas (2000)
- The Princess Diaries (2001)
- Big Fat Liar (2002)
- The Hot Chick (2002)
- Ice Age (2002)
- Treasure Planet (2002)
- Daddy Day Care (2003)
- Legally Blonde 2: Red, White & Blonde (2003)
- Holes (2003)
- Freaky Friday (2003)
- Marci X (2003)
- Elf (2003)
- Mona Lisa Smile (2003)
- Ella Enchanted (2004)
- Around the World in 80 Days (2004)
- Home on the Range (2004) (home entertainment TV spots only)
- 13 Going on 30 (2004) (trailers/TV spots only)
- The Princess Diaries 2: Royal Engagement (2004)
- Shark Tale (2004)
- The Polar Express (2004)
- Because of Winn-Dixie (2005)
- Charlie and the Chocolate Factory (2005)
- Curious George (2006)
- The Pink Panther (2006)
- Ice Age: The Meltdown (2006) (notably some TV spots, trailer had a different voice-over)
- Garfield: A Tail of Two Kitties (2006)
- Clerks II (2006)
- Monster House (2006) (TV spots only)
- The Ant Bully (2006)
- Everyone's Hero (2006)
- Happy Feet (2006) (TV spots only, trailers did not have any voice-over)
- Meet the Robinsons (2007)
- TMNT (home entertainment TV spots only)
- Shrek the Third (2007)
- Surf's Up (2007)
- Daddy Day Camp (2007)
- Tenacious D in the Pick of Destiny (2007) (TV spots only)
- Bee Movie (2007) (TV spots only)
- Nim's Island (2008)
- Beverly Hills Chihuahua (2008)
- Four Christmases (2008)
- The Pink Panther 2 (2009)
- Ice Age: Dawn of the Dinosaurs (2009) (TV spots only)
- Up (2009) (Blu-ray/DVD TV spots and ABC Family promos only)
- Curious George 2: Follow That Monkey! (2010)
- Despicable Me (2010) (ABC Family promos only)
- Ramona and Beezus (2010)
- Rango (2011) (Also the voice of Señor Flan in the film itself.)
- Monte Carlo (2011)
- Arthur Christmas (2011)
- Chimpanzee (2012)
- Ice Age: Continental Drift (2012)
- Escape from Planet Earth (2013) (TV spots only)
- Frozen (2013) (UK TV spots only)
- Rio 2 (2014)
- Bears (2014)
- Dolphin Tale 2 (2014) (TV spots only)
- Monkey Kingdom (2015)
- Ice Age: Collision Course (2016)
- Trolls (2016) (Teaser trailer only)
- The Kid Who Would Be King (2019) (TV spots only)
- Penguins (2019)
- The Art of Racing in the Rain (2019) (TV spots only, trailers did not have any voice-over)
- Bernie the Dolphin 2 (2019)
- Dolphin Reef (2020) (ultimately cancelled theatrical trailer as Dolphins)
- Ice Age: Scrat Tales (promos only, trailer did not have any voice-over)

== Film ==
In 1998, DelHoyo starred in the romantic comedy Dead Letter Office. He appeared in the Academy Award-winning animated feature Rango (2011) produced by Industrial Light & Magic and released by Paramount.

== Filmography ==
=== Television ===
Year	Title	Role	Notes
1979	B.J. and the Bear	Jonas/Six Killer	Episode: "Fly a Wild Horse"
1980	Hart to Hart	Peter Scmidt	Episode: "Downhill to Death"
1980	Galactica 1980	Dr. Spencer	Episode: "The Super Scouts"
1983	Too Close for Comfort	Sal Garibaldi	Episode: "Family Business"
1984	Three's a Crowd	R. Morris	Episode: "Daddy's Little Girl"
1985–1986	St. Elsewhere	Ken Valere	
1986	Hunter	Carlos Mariano	Episode: "High Noon in L.A."
1986	Days of Our Lives	Orpheus	Role: October 20, 1986, to April 23, 1987, and 2016 (Recurring/Guest Role) and 2020–present
1988	Night Court	Bobby Mason	Episode: "Chrizzi's Honor"
1988	Jake and the Fatman	Matthew Hammond	Episode: "How Long Has This Been Going On?"
1988	Cheers	Robert Cooperman	Episode: "Norm, Is That You?"
1991	The Young Riders	Ben Rawlings	Episode: "Old Scores"
1991	Tales from the Crypt	Policeman	Episode: "Carrion Death"
1992	L.A. Law		Episode: "Steal It Again, Sam"
1993-1995	Frasier	Father Mike Mancuso	3 episodes
1995	The Commish	Reggie Martel	Episode: "Brooklyn"
1995	Nowhere Man	The Supervisor	Episode: "Turnabout"
1995	Space: Above and Beyond	Nicholas Chaput	Episode: "Eyes"
1996	Sliders	Judge John Nassau	Episode: "Time Again and World"
1996	Walker Texas Ranger	Ramon Lopez Vega del Garcia	Episode: "Codename Dragonfly"
1997	JAG	Rincon	Episode: "The Game of Go"
1997	Superman: The Animated Series	Kent Nelson / Doctor Fate	Voice, episode: "The Hand of Fate"
1997	Walker, Texas Ranger	Tony Ramos	Episode: "Crusader"
1997	Home Improvement	Doug	2 Episodes
1999	Love Boat: The Next Wave	Patrick Jury	Episode: "Other People's Business"
1999	Just Shoot Me!	Special Agent Justin Morris	Episode: "Nina's Choice"
1999	Stark Raving Mad	Vince	Episode: "Christmas Cheerleader"
2000	Batman Beyond	Captain Zane	Voice, episode: "Final Cut"
2019-Present	9-1-1	Ramon Diaz	Recurring Role

=== Film ===
Year	Title	Role	Notes
1979	The Seekers	Gilbert Kent	Television film
1980	The Secret War of Jackie's Girls	Al	Television film
1988	Perry Mason: The Case of the Lady in the Lake	Frank Travis	Television film
1994	Vault of Horror		Television film
1996	The Crying Child	Ran Jeffreys	Television film
1998	Dead Letter Office	Frank Lopez	
2011	Rango	Señor Flan	Voice

=== Video games ===
Year	Title	Role	Notes
1997	The Curse of Monkey Island	Palido Domingo, Pirate	
