= Overload (video game) =

2018 video game

- Developer: Revival Productions
- Directors: Matt Toschlog; Mike Kulas
- Designer: Luke Schneider
- Programmers: Matt Toschlog; Mike Kulas; Luke Schneider
- Artists: Chris Claflin; Victor Duarte
- Writer: Jason Scott
- Composers: Dan Wentz; Allister Brimble; Luke Schneider; Jerry Berlongieri
- Engine: Unity 5
- Platforms: Windows, macOS, Linux, PlayStation 4, Xbox One
- Release: Windows, Mac, Linux: WW: May 31, 2018; PS4: EU: October 16, 2018; NA: October 24, 2018; Xbox One: WW: March 6, 2019
- Genre: First-person shooter
- Modes: Single-player, multiplayer

Overload is a 3D first-person shooter video game developed and released by Revival Productions for Windows, macOS and Linux on May 31, 2018. A version for PlayStation 4 was released on October 16. It features six degrees of freedom movement in a 3D environment with zero gravity, allowing the player to move and rotate in any direction. The game is set primarily on the moons of Saturn, where facilities have sent out distress signals about the mining robots turning hostile.

The game, which has been described as a 'spiritual successor' to Descent and Descent II, received generally favorable reviews on release.

== Gameplay ==
Screenshot featuring the Holo-Guide leading the player down a hallway.

The gameplay of the game is similar to the Descent series. The player is tasked with controlling a gunship in zero gravity inside a variety of mining facilities and cave areas, fighting hostile worker robots (called autonomous operators in the game) and finding possible survivors in cryostasis tubes. Every level has an objective to complete, with most levels carrying over the traditional goal of destroying the reactor powering the facility and escaping before the reactor meltdown destroys the entire facility. Levels may also feature alternative objectives, such as destroying every hostile robot in a level, destroying a boss or simply finding and reaching the exit.

The game in its core is a first-person shooter with a fully three-dimensional environment, but with six degrees of freedom movement in zero gravity, allowing the player to move and rotate in any direction, which demands spatial awareness skills from the players. The enemy robots share a similar movement model. To assist in navigating around the level, the player can call up a Holo-Guide, a holographic bot that can lead the player to a destination (similar to the Guide-Bot of Descent II), and a fully three-dimensionally rendered automap, based on a similar feature seen in Descent, showing the areas of the level that the player has already discovered or spotted. In order to progress in most levels, the player is required to collect access keys to open doors to access further areas. The levels also contain a variety of secret areas behind camouflaged doors, some of which may be locked and require a puzzle to be solved in order to unlock them.

Overload also features an upgrade system. Upgrade points are scattered around the levels, mostly behind secret areas, and are also given for completing certain tasks, such as finding all of the survivor cryostasis tubes. The player can upgrade the gunship with these points between levels, with upgrades available for both the weapons and the ship itself.

If the player racks up too much damage and depletes the gunship's armor, the ship is destroyed. The player is then required to load from an earlier save (single-player campaign only) or to restart the level.

There are two single-player modes in the game. The first is the Cronus Frontier campaign featuring 16 levels and three bosses, while the second is Challenge Mode, a survival mode taking place in twelve different levels. The Challenge Mode features two modes of its own, Infinite and Countdown, and its levels are smaller than those of the campaign. The campaign story features full voice acting in English, with subtitles available in the other languages supported by the game. Once the campaign has been completed, it can be played again with increased difficulty and the upgrades the player collected from the first playthrough. Challenge Mode also features an online leaderboard, where scores of the players can be categorized by level, difficulty and mode.

Keyboard, mouse, gamepad and joystick controls are among those supported. The game also supports virtual reality with both the HTC Vive and the Oculus Rift.

Overload features online multiplayer with three modes: Head to Head, Anarchy and Team Anarchy. The game, which uses a client–server model, can be played on online servers, featuring both public and private matches, or over a LAN. Cross-platform multiplayer is supported between the supported computer platforms, and in addition, PC players are able to play with PlayStation 4 and Xbox One players, but players of these consoles cannot play with each other.

The game supports user-created levels, which can be created with an official level editor.

== Plot ==
The game begins in 2118 with a multi-purpose service vessel (MPSV) approaching Ymir, one of the moons of Saturn. The vessel, called Iberia, is registered to Cronus Frontier, a colony located on the moons of Saturn that was established eleven years prior by Juno Offworld Automation, a corporation working in the space industry, of which Cronus Frontier is a subsidiary. The colony consists of the outer moons of Ymir, Tarvos, Skoll, and Phoebe, Titan, and the inner moons of Tethys and Enceladus. The outer moons are mostly uninhabited mining installations on the fringes of Saturn’s orbit. Saturn’s largest moon Titan houses the majority of the colonial population along with the astrophysics, manufacturing, particle physics, metallurgical, and administrative operations. Lastly, the inner moons of Tethys and Enceladus hold the colony’s secretive advanced research and gas mining operations, respectively.

The unnamed protagonist awakes from cryostasis with neurological damage and amnesia, and is informed by Mara, a self-described synthetic intelligence construct on the Iberia, that the vessel is now in the orbit of Ymir and has arrived to help those in the mining facility on the moon after receiving a distress signal from its staff. The distress signal stated that the autonomous operators used for mining and security purposes have malfunctioned, turned hostile, and attacked the human employees currently working inside the facility. In accordance with interplanetary treaty, the Iberia is obligated to respond to the distress signal.

The protagonist is supplied with a Kodachi light gunship, a small, highly maneuverable but heavily armed spacecraft capable of navigating the mines and installations of Chronus Frontier.

After the initial rescue operation at Ymir, the player quickly becomes aware of the contentious relationship between Chronus Frontier CEO Gabriel Kantor and parent company Juno Offworld. Kantor had evidently become increasingly paranoid and irritated with Juno’s interference in Chronus Frontier’s development. As a result, Kantor threatens Juno with a destructive computer virus. In response, the Iberia receives a transmission from Juno Offworld headquarters to overload the reactor cores of all Chronus Frontier facilities, resulting in explosions that will pulverize the respective facility. Strangely, Juno does not explicitly specify to also rescue survivors. Therefore, Mara appends the secondary objective to acquire all surviving personnel who have fled to cryostasis tubes. The Iberia is also unable to establish contact with the other colonists on Titan, as communications are mysteriously garbled.

At the outer moons, the player discovers that Kantor ordered a massive buildup of security-based auto-ops as well as the development of new military-grade operators, believing that the colony was under imminent threat of attack. Kantor also ordered that full radio-silence would be observed between all colony facilities, forbid evacuation of the colony, and became obsessed with the loyalty of his subordinates.

Upon arriving at Titan, Mara ascertains that the Iberia’s communication with Titan was scrambled in both directions, indicating some form of sabotage aboard the Iberia. The player also continues to fail to recover from his amnesia. Regardless, the auto-ops at Titan have also become hostile and forced survivors into cryostasis. Through audio-logs of the chief Titan personnel, the player discovers that Kantor ordered each Titan operation to manufacturer an individual piece of new, exotic technology. For example, the Titan Forge would craft components for new auto-op designs, while Titan Collider would develop an immensely destructive energy weapon known as the Thunderbolt. Kantor apparently became increasingly belligerent and abusive to his engineers and scientists, demanding that they risk their lives to complete the new projects. Simultaneously, Kantor claimed to be the inventor of the new tech.

At the administrative complex of Titan Harbour, the player discovers that a hydro-geologist named Harper Eames, who was working closely with Kantor on a mysterious project on Enceladus, secretly requested that a small shipment of unknown contents be transferred to the Iberia along with shuttle pilot Alex Warden shortly before it departed from the colony. After destroying the entirety of the Titan facilities, the Iberia departs for the inner moon of Tethys. En route, Mara recovers an audio-log from the chief scientist on Tethys, revealing that a crashed alien craft was discovered in the ice below the Enceladus facility. The player also discovers that Kantor was responsible for the deaths of a construction crew who also discovered the alien wreckage by sabotaging their shuttlecraft. This was in order to prevent Juno Offworld from learning about the discovery of the alien ship. The message also specifies that the alien craft had the capacity for three artificial intelligence cores called sovereigns. Kantor then aggressively utilized the capabilities of Chronus Frontier to reconstruct the alien technology, under the falsehood that he had invented it.

Finally proceeding to the last-remaining base of Enceladus to confront Kantor, the Iberia receives another message from Juno Offworld Headquarters. The message commands that the Iberia stand down and return to the outer moon of Ymir. Suspicious of the orders, Mara is able to override the command and deploys the player into the Enceladus facility. The player nearly intercepts Kantor at the alien craft excavation site, but discovers that he has reconstructed an interstellar portal connecting to a different part of the galaxy. The intense gravimetric distortion from the portal destroys the Enceladus base as the player enters the portal. The player recovers an audio log from Harper Eames that confirms that Kantor is in possession of the first of three sovereign cores. Eames hid the second sovereign on board the Iberia while the third was never discovered. Kantor sadistically confesses that he used his brutal new auto-op design to kill Eames and others whom for he had no further use.

On the other side of the portal, the player emerges into the interior of an alien structure of massive proportions. Now aware of the player’s presence, Kantor directly contacts the player via radio, believing him to be a pirate or operative from a competing mining corporation. After recollecting the Kodachi gunship, Kantor is able to ascertain that the amnesia-stricken pilot is in fact Alex Warden, a shuttle pilot formerly of Chronus Frontier. Kantor’s revelation is a catalyst for Warden to recall the entirety of his memories. Kantor explains that the aliens are a race of sentient machines that assimilate the consciousness of civilizations, and he believes that pursuing the alien technology will accelerate the evolution of humanity by hundreds of thousands of years. As the player pursues Kantor through the maze-like and dangerous alien structure, Kantor is evidently seized by the first sovereign and his consciousness assimilated into its own. In his final moments of lucidity, the Kantor-sovereign intelligence determines that the missing third sovereign is on the moon of Ymir. The first sovereign taunts Warden by falsely claiming that its legions have already overrun and enslaved humanity. The first sovereign also reveals that its sister core, the second sovereign, was responsible for Iberia’s redeployment to Chronus Frontier and masqueraded as Juno Offworld in order to take vengeance upon the colony. It also aborted Warden’s cryostasis diagnostics to prevent the pilot from morally objecting to the colony’s destruction. Unshaken, Warden destroys the first sovereign and finds a portal to return to Ymir, which is being utilized by the alien machines as a staging point to launch an invasion of humanity.

Warden emerges on Ymir, finding it overrun with alien machines and the Iberia now in orbit. The second sovereign, still on Iberia, briefly took control of the ship and forced it to Ymir, while the third sovereign has attached itself to the still-intact reactor core of the Ymir base. Warden attacks the reactor but is unable to overload it. At this point, the game will conclude in one of two ways. If the player rescued a majority number of survivors from Chronus Frontier, they will construct a warhead and fire it from the Iberia to annihilate Ymir along with the third sovereign. The Iberia will then return to Juno Offworld headquarters, having isolated the second sovereign from its systems. If, however, the player neglected to conduct rescue efforts, Mara will be forced to crash the Iberia into the Ymir installation. The blast is not sufficient to completely destroy the sovereign, and rescue crews from Juno Offworld discover pieces of the sovereigns intact on Ymir. In this ending, Warden is also forced to undergo cryostasis once again in the Kodachi gunship, and is unable to warn the Juno crews.

== Development ==
Members of Revival Productions, the studio behind the game, include founders Matt Toschlog and Mike Kulas, who started Parallax Software, the company behind the first two Descent titles, as well as Luke Schneider from Radian Games.

The development for Overload started out as an idea to create a tunnel shooter for the 20th anniversary of the release of Descent, with the idea slowly shifting into that of a 6DOF game with virtual reality support and eventually into a Descent-like game. The project started with Mike Kulas, Matt Toschlog and Luke Schneider in an email discussion, with Schneider being the one to come up with the name Overload. In September 2014, Toschlog announced to former Parallax Software employees about the project and the establishment of Revival Productions. While the project was put on hold for some time, it continued as Chris Claflin, a former artist at Volition (one of the two companies Parallax Software originally split into), joined the project. The four launched their Kickstarter campaign on February 10, 2016. The project was partially funded with $306,537 raised from 4,896 backers on March 12.

The game was originally single-player only, but a free multiplayer expansion was first promised to all Kickstarter backers and eventually to all game owners. The user interface was particularly inspired by Elite Dangerous and heads-up displays of fighter jets. Among the people who developed the music and sound effects for Overload were Dan Wentz and Allister Brimble, who worked on the original sound design and MIDI music of Descent, and Jerry Berlongieri, who worked on the music of Descent 3. In February 2016, Dan Wentz released previews for the game soundtrack via his SoundCloud account.

The game is developed with Unity 5. A 'playable teaser' was released on March 7, 2016 via the Steam distribution platform and a second demo showcasing VR features of the game was demonstrated at PAX west in September. The game was made available on Steam via the early access model in March 2017. The early access version received several updates through 2017 and 2018. The Windows, macOS and Linux versions of Overload were released on May 31, 2018, while the versions for PlayStation 4 and Xbox One came later in Q3 2018. Revival Productions closed their doors after Overload was released and merged the company back into Volition Inc./Parallax Software.

== Reception ==
Reception

Aggregate score
Aggregator	Score
Metacritic	75/100

Review scores
Publication	Score
GameStar	62/100
4Players	88/100
PC Games	75/100

When the game was first announced, it was described as a 'spiritual successor' to Descent and Descent II. On release, the game received positive coverage from Rock, Paper, Shotgun and Engadget, with Dominic Tarason of the former calling it "very good".

Metacritic states that the game received "generally favorable reviews". 4Players praised the music as well as the level and sound design, while criticizing the lack of variety. GameStar was less positive, criticizing the repetitive gameplay and the excessive difficulty of the later levels.
