= Jerry Berlongieri =

- Origin: U.S.
- Occupations: Composer, Sound editor, Sound director

Jerry Berlongieri is an American electronic musician, producer, designer, director, and a score composer for video games. He is known for his work as a composer for Descent 3, Alter Echo and Overload and as an Audio Director on Spider-Man, James Bond 007, Call of Duty and Skylanders.

== Composer ==
- Descent 3 Original Soundtrack (1999)
- Evenings At The Microscope (1999)
- Alter Echo Original Soundtrack (2003)
- Descent Mercenary Original Soundtrack
- Descent 3
- Goalie Fritz
- Rubu Tribe (unfinished)
- Overload (2018)

== Sound Department ==
- Marvel's Spider-Man 2 (2023)
- Rachet and Clank: Rift Apart (2021)
- Spider-Man Miles Morales (2020)
- Overload (2018)
- Quantum Break (2016)
- Project Spark (2014)
- Adera (2012)
- Skylanders: Spyro's Adventure (2011)
- 007: Blood Stone (2010)
- Blur (2010)
- Call of Duty: Black Ops (2010)
- DJ Hero 2 (2010)
- GoldenEye 007 (2010)
- Shrek Forever After: The Final Chapter (2010)
- Tony Hawk: Shred (2010)
- Transformers: War for Cybertron (2010)
- 007: Quantum of Solace (2008)
- Call of Duty: World at War (2008)
- Spider-Man 3 (2007)
- Call of Duty 3 (2006)
- Ultimate Spider-Man (2005)
- Ultimate Spider-Man (Limited Edition) (2005)
- Alter Echo (2003)
- Descent³ (1999)
- Descent³ / Descent³: Mercenary (1999)
- Disney's Animated Storybook: 101 Dalmatians (1997)
- Disney's Animated Storybook: Hercules (1997)
- Magic Fairy Tales: Barbie as Rapunzel (1997)
- Tonka Search & Rescue (1997)
- Disney's Animated Storybook: The Hunchback of Notre Dame (1996)
- Disney's Animated Storybook: Pocahontas (1995)
- Disney's Animated Storybook: Winnie the Pooh (1995)
