= Descent 3 =

1999 video game

- North American cover art
- Developer: Outrage Entertainment
- Publisher: Interplay Entertainment
- Director: Matt Toschlog
- Producer: Craig Derrick
- Composer: Jerry Berlongieri
- Platforms: Windows, Mac OS, Linux
- Release: June 17, 1999: Windows; NA: June 17, 1999; EU: July 2, 1999; Mac OS; NA: November 23, 1999; Linux; NA: July 2000
- Genres: First-person shooter, shoot 'em up
- Modes: Single-player, multiplayer

Descent 3 is a first-person shooter video game developed by Outrage Entertainment and published by Interplay Entertainment. It was originally released for Microsoft Windows in North America on June 17, 1999. Descent 3 is the third game in the Descent video game series and a sequel to Descent II. The game takes place in a science fiction setting of the Solar System where the player is cast as Material Defender, a mercenary who must help an organization known as the Red Acropolis Research Team to stop robots infected by an alien virus.

Unlike in standard first-person shooters, the player must control a flying ship that has a six degrees of freedom movement scheme, allowing the player to move and rotate in any 3D direction. In addition to a single-player campaign mode, Descent 3 features an online multiplayer mode where numerous players can compete against each other in eight different game types. The game features both indoor and outdoor environments, made possible with the use of a hybrid engine that combines the capabilities of a portal rendering engine with those of a flight simulator-like terrain engine.

Descent 3 received positive reviews from critics, holding a score of 89 out of 100 at review aggregate website Metacritic. The most praised aspects of the game were its graphics, artificial intelligence of enemies, and outdoor environments. An official expansion pack, Descent 3: Mercenary, was released on December 3, 1999. The expansion pack includes a new series of missions, multiplayer maps, and a level editor. After its release on Microsoft Windows, the game was subsequently ported to Mac OS and Linux platforms.

== Gameplay ==
The player, piloting a ship from a first-person perspective, shoots enemies with the plasma cannon. The left frame depicts the currently selected primary weapon, the middle panel shows the ship's status, and the right frame displays the currently selected secondary weapon.

Like its predecessors Descent and Descent II, Descent 3 is a six degrees of freedom shooter where the player controls a flying ship from a first-person perspective in zero-gravity. It is differentiated from standard first-person shooters in that it allows the player to move and rotate in any 3D direction. Specifically, the player is free to move forward/backward, up/down, left/right, and rotate in three perpendicular axes, often termed pitch, yaw, and roll. Aboard the ship, the player can shoot enemies, turn on the ship's afterburners to temporarily increase its acceleration and speed, and fire flares or turn on the ship's headlight to explore darkened areas.

In the game's single-player mode, the player must complete a series of levels where multiple enemies controlled by the game's artificial intelligence will try to hinder the player's progress. The game primarily takes place inside labyrinthine underground facilities, but the player can occasionally travel over the surface of the planets where the facilities are buried to reach other nearby areas. The underground facilities are composed of a set of tunnels and rooms separated by doors. Most of them can be opened by either firing weapons at them or bumping into them, but others require special actions to be performed first before entry is allowed. For instance, some doors require special keys that must be collected. To finish a level and proceed to the next one, the player must complete a set of objectives that range from collecting items to activating switches, defeating enemies, and destroying objects.

As the player progresses throughout the game, two additional ships become available for use. Each of the game's three ships offers a different balance of speed, weapons, and maneuverability. Within the levels, the player may collect power-ups that enhance the ship's weaponry. Weapons are categorized into three different types: primary weapons, secondary weapons, and countermeasures. Primary weapons range from a variety of laser plasma cannon and the napalm cannon, which projects a stream of burning fuel. Secondary weapons include different types of missiles, while countermeasures range from proximity mines to portable turrets. Most primary weapons consume energy in different rate, but some, such as the Napalm Cannon, use their own type of ammunition. In contrast, all secondary weapons and countermeasures require their own ammunition suppliers.

The player's ship is protected by a shield which decreases when attacked by enemies. If the shield is fully depleted, the player dies and must start the game again from a previous section of the fight without any collected power-ups. Nevertheless, the player can reclaim the missing power-ups from the ruins of the destroyed ship. Shield, energy, and ammunition suppliers are dispersed among the levels to help players increase their resources. The player can also collect equipment items which grant special powers. For example, the Quad Laser modifies the laser weapons to fire four shots at once instead of the standard two, while the Cloaking Device renders the player invisible to enemies for 30 seconds. During the game, the player may also deploy the Guide-Bot, an assistant that keeps track of the next objective and shows the player the way to a specific target.

=== Multiplayer ===
In addition to the single-player campaign mode, Descent 3 features an online multiplayer mode where numerous players can compete against each other in eight different game types. Notable game types include Anarchy, where the objective is to kill as many opponents as possible, Capture the Flag, where two to four teams compete against each other to capture opposing flags, and Monsterball, in which players must shoot and guide a ball into their opponents' goal. Aspects such as time limit, number of players, map to play on, and selection of what weapons are allowed, among others, can be customized to match player preference. The game also features an observer mode which allows players to watch a multiplayer game as a spectator and a co-operative mode that allows players to work together to complete campaign missions. Multiplayer games support the DirectPlay, IPX, and TCP/IP protocols. Online gameplay was also possible over Parallax Online, an online gaming service which kept track of players' statistics and rankings.

== Plot ==
Descent 3 takes place in a science fiction setting of the Solar System where the player is cast as Material Defender MD1032, a mercenary working for a corporation called the Post Terran Mining Corporation (PTMC). The game begins moments after the events of Descent II, with the Material Defender escaping the destruction of a planetoid where he was clearing PTMC's robots infected by an alien virus. He was about to return to Earth to collect his reward, but a malfunction occurred with the prototype warp drive in the ship he was piloting, making it drift towards the Sun's atmosphere. At the very last moment, the Material Defender is rescued via a tractor beam by an organization known as the Red Acropolis Research Team.

While the Material Defender recovers in the Red Acropolis station on Mars, the director of the team informs him that they have been investigating PTMC, and have uncovered a conspiracy: one of her acquaintances in the PTMC was killed by a robot, and when she contacted PTMC about it, they denied having ever employed such acquaintance, even though he had worked with them for years. The Red Acropolis had tried to notify the Collective Earth Defense (CED), a large police group, of the PTMC's actions, but they took no action, not daring to interfere with such a powerful corporation. The director also tells the Material Defender that, while he was clearing the mines during the events of Descent II, PTMC executive Samuel Dravis was actually testing and modifying the virus and deliberately tried to kill him by overloading the warp drive on his ship. After some persuasion and offers from the director, including a new ship and an AI assistant known as the Guide-Bot, the Material Defender accepts to help the Red Acropolis stop the virus.

The Material Defender is first sent to Deimos to obtain information about the location of a scientist named Dr. Sweitzer who has evidence of the PTMC's actions. He is then rescued in the Novak Corporate Prison on Phobos. After recovering the evidence, the Material Defender delivers it to PTMC President Suzuki in Seoul before leaving with his reward. When the Material Defender arrives at the Red Acropolis Research Station, the director tells him that the PTMC president has been killed and that the Red Acropolis Research Team are now accused of being terrorists, resulting in the destruction of the then-abandoned station. After a series of missions, the Material Defender and the Red Acropolis Research Team manage to develop an antivirus and convince the CED that they are not terrorists. The CED suggest to broadcast the antivirus through their strategic platform orbiting Earth, but the results are unsuccessful. The Material Defender is then sent to Venus, where Dravis has been tracked by the Red Acropolis. In the ensuing confrontation in his stronghold, Dravis is mortally wounded by the Guide-Bot's flares and the Material Defender deactivates the virus, which disables all of the PTMC's robots. The game ends with the CED destroying the PTMC's orbital headquarters while the Material Defender returns to Earth.

== Development ==
Descent 3 is the first project developed by Outrage Entertainment. The company was founded when Parallax Software, creators of previous Descent games, decided to split in two: Outrage Entertainment and Volition. Volition would focus on creating the combat space simulator FreeSpace games, while Outrage would continue with the Descent series. Development on Descent 3 began in November 1996 with a team of eight people. The developers worked to incorporate a number of ideas they had for the original Descent which they were unable to realize for that game due to the limitations of time and the technology that was then available. According to programmer Jason Leighton, one of the major problems during the game's development cycle was a lack of direction and control. He explained that the team had "No code reviews, no art reviews, [and] no way of saying, 'This is bad and we should be going in a different direction.'" This lack of oversight and authority worked for Descent and Descent II because they were developed by small groups that worked closely together and often in the same room. However, as Outrage grew from eight people to almost 20 by the end of the project, the developers did not introduce enough management to control the process. Leighton recalled having to build the team and company while starting work on the game.

Originally, Descent 3 was intended to support both a software and a hardware renderer, implying that the rendering process of the game could take place either in the CPU or dedicated hardware like a video card, but about six months after starting development, the team decided to go with a hardware-only renderer because it allowed them to create impressive graphics and maintain a solid frame rate without worrying about the limitations imposed by the software renderer. This was a difficult decision since the team had to scrap many tools and software rendering technology that were already developed. In addition, computers with hardware acceleration were not common at the time the decision was made. The developers stated: "We knew just by looking at our progress on the game under acceleration that we had a beautiful looking game with all the latest technologies — but would anyone actually be able to play it?" As development progressed, hardware acceleration became more popular. The game natively supports the Direct3D, Glide and OpenGL rendering APIs for graphics, and the A3D and DirectSound3D technologies for sound.

The new technology also allowed the developers to create both indoor and outdoor environments; one of the biggest complaints of Descent II was that it was considered too "tunnely". To this end, the developers created a new technology which featured an indoor portal rendering engine connected to a flight-sim-like terrain engine, collectively called the Fusion Engine. The portal engine permitted designers to create small rooms with complex geometry. These rooms would later be linked together via shared dividing polygons called portals to create a portalized world for the player to fly through. In contrast, the terrain engine, which was initially planned for another game and whose function is to create more polygonal detail as players get closer to the ground and decrease polygons when they are farther away, gave designers the ability to create expansive outdoor terrains. Transitions between both engines were achieved using an external room (with its normal vectors inverted) that could be placed anywhere on the terrain map. With this technique, developers could create hybrid levels where the player could transit from indoor to outdoor areas in real-time and without loading screens. Leighton commented that whenever one of these transitions occurs, "the game code [switches] collision detection, rendering, and so on, to use the terrain engine."

The company had no standardization of level design tools. Leighton said, "Some people used 3D Studio Max, some used Lightwave, and one designer even wrote his own custom modeler from scratch." This practice led to an inconsistent quality across the game's levels. For example, one designer would create structures with great geometry but bad texturing, while another would create the opposite. Once the structures were modeled individually, they were all imported into a custom editor, called D3Edit, so that the designers could assemble the elements into the levels. The D3Edit editor received constant updates because it initially did not feature an intuitive interface for designers. It was not until the last third of the development period that the editor improved significantly. Leighton remarked, "Even in the shipped game you can tell which levels were made early on and which were made near the end of the production cycle. The later levels are much better looking, have better frame rates, and generally have better scripts." Developers also considered the idea of shipping the game with a level editor based on the one they used to create the game's levels. Due to the constant changes the developers made to their own editor, it was hard for them to design a more user-friendly one.

In addition to the changes in the game's engine, the developers decided to improve the artificial intelligence to give each enemy a distinct behavior. According to Matt Toschlog, president of Outrage Entertainment and lead programmer of Descent 3, "It's very rewarding for the player to meet a new enemy, get to know him, learn his quirks, and figure out the best way to kill him. It's great when a game requires both thinking and quick reactions." Originally, the developers planned to add weather effects that would disorient the player's ship during gameplay, but this feature was ultimately not implemented due to time and technology constraints. Multiplayer games were heavily tested to ensure their network stability and support IPX, TCP, and DirectPlay. The actual development of the game took 31 months to complete, with the developers describing it as both a joyful and painful process due to in part of the almost nonexistent management and the rapidly evolving technology at the time.

== Marketing and release ==
Descent 3 was presented at the Electronic Entertainment Expo in 1998, where developers showed off a demonstration of the game. In the months leading to the game's release, the game's publisher, Interplay Productions, ran a program that allowed Descent fans to submit a digital photo of themselves along with a pilot name to the company. These photos would later be included in the game so that players could use them as their multiplayer profiles. Outrage also released two game demos that allowed customers to try the game before purchasing it. The second demo included a single-player level and several multiplayer matches which could be played through a matchmaking service provided by Outrage. From March to August 1999, Interplay held a Descent 3 tournament in the United States consisting of three phases where numerous players could compete against each other in multiplayer matches. The winner was awarded a prize of US$50,000.

Descent 3 was initially released for Microsoft Windows on June 17, 1999. A level editor was released shortly afterwards, allowing users to create both single and multiplayer maps for the game. A Mac OS version of the game was released on November 23, 1999. The Mac OS version was ported by programmer Duane Johnson, who previously worked on the 3dfx versions of the original Descent and Descent II. Descent 3 was ported to Linux platforms by Loki Entertainment Software after an agreement with the game's publisher. The port, which features a multiplayer mode optimized for 16 players, was released in July 2000.

An expansion pack, titled Descent 3: Mercenary, was released for Microsoft Windows on December 3, 1999. The expansion introduces new features, a seven-level campaign, a fourth ship, and several multiplayer maps. It also includes the game's level editor. Although the expansion was praised for adding more replay value to the game, the level design of the new campaign was considered inferior to that of the base game. A compilation that includes both Descent 3 and its expansion pack was released on June 14, 2001. In 2014, the game was released on the Steam digital distribution service.

On April 16, 2024, Kevin Bentley released the source code for Descent 3, but without audio and video libraries.

== Reception ==
Reception

Aggregate scores
| Aggregator | Score |
|---|---|
| GameRankings | 84% |
| Metacritic | 89/100 |

Review scores
| Publication | Score |
|---|---|
| Computer Games Magazine | 4/5 |
| EP Daily | 90% |
| GamePro | 4.5/5 |
| GameRevolution | A− |
| GameSpot | 9/10 |
| IGN | 9/10 |
| Maximum PC | 8/10 |
| Next Generation | 5/5 |
| PC Gamer (UK) | 93% |

Descent 3 received positive reviews from video game critics. The most praised aspects were its graphics, artificial intelligence of enemies, and outdoor environments. Erik Wolpaw of GameSpot felt that the game "improves in almost every conceivable way on its predecessors and reestablishes the series as the premier example of the play style it single-handedly pioneered", while Next Generation praised both its originality and faithfulness to its predecessors. IGN lauded the game's new engine, noting that the transition between indoor and outdoor environments is seamless. GameRevolution remarked that the addition of outdoor environments allows "greater use of the maneuvering capabilities, adds variety to the levels, and ensures that the game never gets dull or boring". The reviewer also acknowledged that the game's six degrees of freedom movement scheme may be difficult to master for some players, stating that the game "can be confusing, dizzying, and even nauseating. This is a game for the pro's".

The music and sound effects received similar praise. GameSpot pointed out that "explosions erupt with lots of satisfying, floor-rattling bass, lasers ping nicely, flamethrowers emit appropriate rumbling whooshes, and there's plenty of ambient beeping, hissing, and mechanical humming". Game Revolution praised the graphics for their "modeling, colored lighting, incredible special effects, wonderful animation, [and] sheer overall feel". Victor Lucas of Electric Playground stated similar pros, but also admitted that the game's hardware requirements were relatively high. Criticism was leveled at the game's story. GameSpot considered it not compelling, while Jason Cross, writing for Computer Games Magazine, felt that it "really doesn't have much to do with actual gameplay". PC Gamer reviewer Stephen Poole also criticized the Guide-Bot's efficiency, remarking that sometimes it can get lost or trapped while leading the player to a destination.

The gameplay was praised for its variety of weapons and enemies. Game Revolution said that each enemy is "unique both in ability, structure, and behavior so that each requires a specific combat approach". Maximum PC reviewer Josh Norem praised the levels for their interesting objectives, stating that the missions "vary widely, ranging from finding lost colleagues to defending strategic structures against enemy assaults". Computer Games Magazine praised the fact that the developers replaced the wire-frame automaps of previous Descent games with flat-shaded polygons because they "provide more detail and make it easier to recognize where you are and how to get where you want to go". The multiplayer was highlighted positively due to its replay value and variety of game types. Computer Games Magazine also credited its "rock-solid performance on standard dialup modems and easy connectivity", while GameSpot praised it for being "fun and stable". The game was a runner-up for GameSpy's Action Game of the Year and a nominee for GameSpot's PC Action Game of the Year.

=== Sales ===
Despite positive reviews and the commercial success of its predecessors, Descent 3 was a commercial disappointment. According to PC Data, its sales in the United States were under 40,000 units by the end of September 1999, which drew revenues of roughly $1.7 million. A writer for PC Accelerator remarked that this figure was "not enough to keep publishers plugging at long, expensive development cycles in the hope of scoring a Half-Life". By the end of 1999, Descent 3's sales had risen to 52,294 units in the United States. Daily Radar's Andrew S. Bub presented Descent 3 with his "System Shock Award" (named after the 1994 game of the same name by Looking Glass Studios), arguing that it was difficult "to find a better game that under-performed sales-wise, this year". Descent 3's sales were similarly low in the German market. It debuted in 27th place on Media Control's computer game sales rankings, and fell to 33rd, 56th and 78th over the following three months, respectively. Interplay blamed its underperformance in the region on stiff competition in the genre. Conversely, PC Player's Udo Hoffman reported a German retailer's view that "the genre is no longer popular", and that demand for a mission pack was at "0.0 percent".

== Other uses ==
A study published in 2002 used Descent 3 to study hawkmoth flight activities. Using the game's editing module, the researchers created a virtual environment consisting of a flat plane with rectangular pillars, across which the animal successfully navigated. This was one of the first successful attempts at studying insect flight using virtual reality.
