= Star of the Family =

1982 American television sitcom

- Main cast
- Genre: Sitcom
- Created by: Stu Silver; Rick Mitz
- Starring: Brian Dennehy; Kathy Maisnik; Michael Dudikoff; Todd Susman; Evonne Kezios
- Opening theme: "Movin' Along" performed by Kathy Maisnik
- Composer: Steve Nelson
- Country of origin: United States
- Original language: English
- No. of seasons: 1
- No. of episodes: 10

Production
- Executive producers: Charles H. Joffe; Buddy Morra; Larry Brezner
- Producers: Stu Silver; Paul Waigner; Jack Siefert
- Camera setup: Multi-camera
- Running time: 30 minutes
- Production companies: RJMB; Little Andrew Enterprises; Paramount Television

Original release
- Network: ABC
- Release: September 30 – December 9, 1982

Star of the Family is an American sitcom that aired on ABC from September 30 to December 9, 1982. The show featured Brian Dennehy as fire chief Leslie "Buddy" Krebs and Katherine Saltzberg, then Maisnik, as his singer daughter, Jennie Lee Krebs. The show was developed by Robin Williams, then an ABC star in Mork & Mindy.

The series debuted on September 30, 1982, on Thursdays after Joanie Loves Chachi, and was canceled after ten episodes.

== Synopsis ==
Fire Captain Buddy Krebs' (Dennehy) 16-year-old daughter Jennie Lee (Maisnik) begins getting show-business offers because of her singing talents in the country/pop genre. This scares Buddy because he does not want his daughter to grow up too fast. Adding to his troubles, his wife runs off with a bellhop, and his 17-year-old son (Michael Dudikoff) has more muscles than brains. Additionally, his crew at the firehouse are "strange": Leo Feldman (Todd Susman) tells his mother he is a doctor instead of a fireman; Frank Rosetti (George Deloy) has only sex on the brain; and Max Hernandez (Danny Mora), a Hispanic, speaks fractured English. Finally, his daughter signs with a manager named Judy "Moose" Wells (Judy Pioli): the name fits the description of the woman. Another character on the series was named Tiffany (played by Amanda Wyss).

== Casting ==
Kathy Maisnik was 19 years old when she was cast as Jennie Lee; Star of the Family was her first professional acting role. Executive producer Larry Brezner said, "The determination to cast her came from Brian Dennehy more than anyone else. We were down to three girls, and each of them had to come in and play the role with 20 network executives looking on. She was the only one who you believed could have stood up to Brian."

== Reception ==
Barbara Holsopple of The Pittsburgh Press said that the show is "great family fun and boasts two gems... Just watching their faces as they react to each other makes your mouth smile as something tugs at your heart."

Bill Hayden of the Gannett News Service panned the show, saying, "Brian Dennehey and Kathy Maisnik deserve medals for valor. These very talented performers are forced to waste their skills as the leads of Star of the Family... The producers have taken what is a bright, engaging concept and encumbered it with so many stock characters and situations that it is a prematurely tired, routine comedy."

== Cast ==
- Brian Dennehy as Leslie "Buddy" Krebs
- Kathy Maisnik as Jennie Lee Krebs
- Michael Dudikoff as Dougie Krebs
- George DelHoyo as Frank Rosetti
- Todd Susman as Leo Feldman
- Robert Clotworthy as Bigelow

== Episodes ==
No.	Title	Directed by	Written by	Original release date
1	"Pilot"	Joel Zwick	Stu Silver	September 30, 1982
2	"The Critic"	Unknown	Unknown	October 14, 1982
3	"Save My Life, Please"	Unknown	Unknown	October 21, 1982
4	"Marking Time"	Unknown	Unknown	October 28, 1982
5	"Quiet Kind of Hero"	Unknown	Unknown	November 4, 1982
6	"Spring Is in the Air"	Jon Sharp	Stu Silver	November 11, 1982
7	"I Got It Good and That Ain't Good"	Unknown	Unknown	November 18, 1982
8	"The Boy Next Door"	Unknown	Unknown	November 18, 1982
9	"Phil"	Unknown	Unknown	December 2, 1982
10	"Arcade Wars"	Unknown	Unknown	December 9, 1982

== US TV ratings ==
Season	Episodes	Start date	End date	Nielsen rank	Nielsen rating
1982–83	10	September 30, 1982	December 9, 1982	84	N/A
