= 3Dconnexion =

German manufacturer of human interface devices

- Company type: Private
- Industry: Hardware, software
- Founded: September 2001; 24 years ago
- Headquarters: Munich, Germany
- Website: 3dconnexion.com

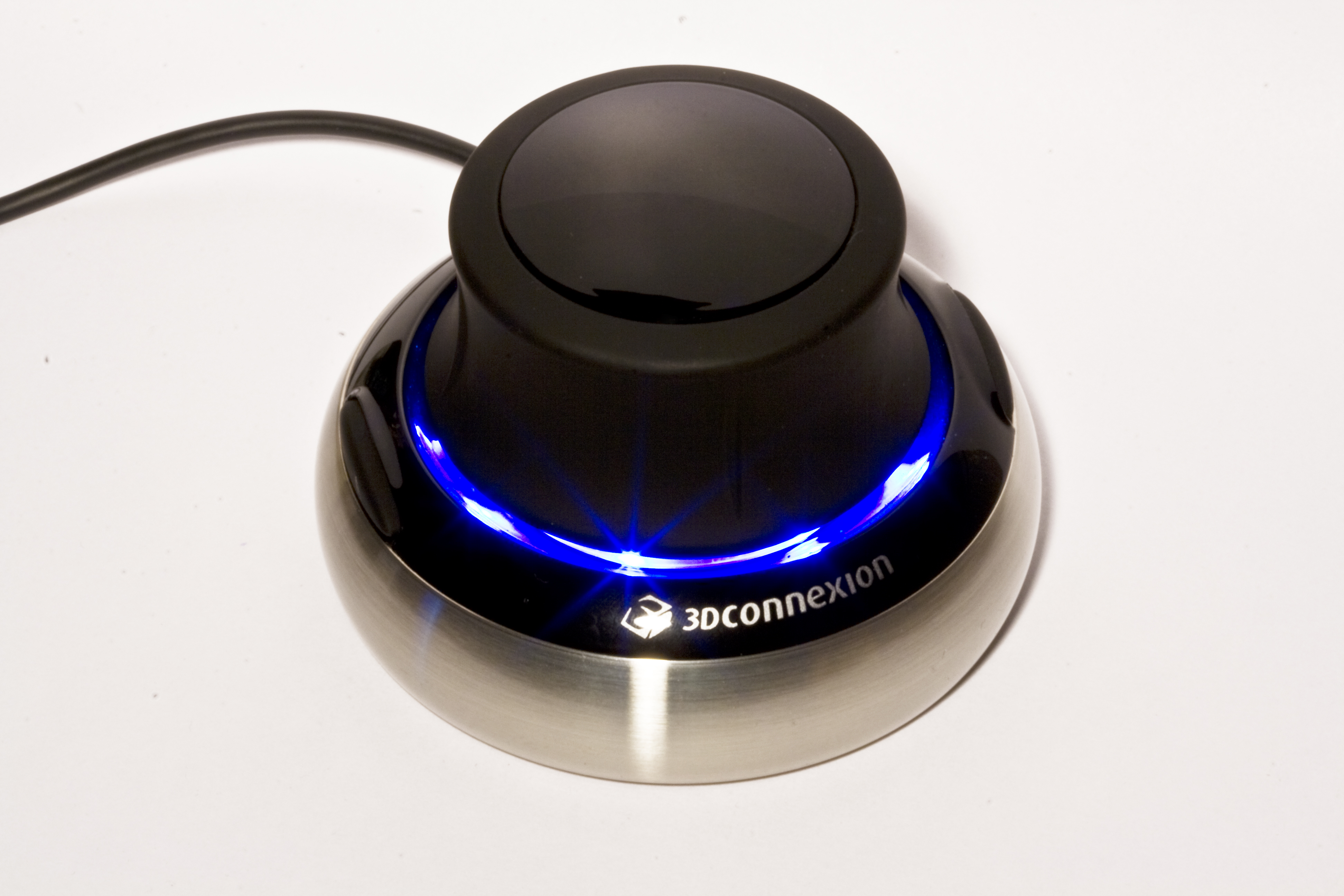
SpaceNavigator

3Dconnexion is a German manufacturer of human interface devices for manipulating and navigating computer-generated 3D imagery. These devices are often referred to as 3D motion controllers, 3D navigation devices, 6DOF (six degrees of freedom) devices or a 3D mouse.

Commonly utilized in Computer-aided design (CAD) applications, 3D modeling, animation, 3D visualization and product visualization, users can manipulate the controller's pressure-sensitive handle (historically referred to as either a cap, ball, mouse or knob) to fly through 3D environments or manipulate 3D models within an application. The appeal of these devices over a mouse and keyboard is the ability to pan, zoom and rotate 3D imagery simultaneously, without stopping to change directions using keyboard shortcuts or a software interface. 3Dconnexion devices are compatible with over 300 applications including Autodesk Inventor, Autodesk Fusion, AutoCAD, Siemens NX, CATIA, SOLIDWORKS, PTC Creo, Solid Edge, Blender, Rhinoceros, Revit, SketchUp, Unreal Engine, Unity, Cinema4D, 3ds Max, Maya, Google Earth, Second Life, NASA World Wind, Virtual Earth 3D, Geomagic, T-FLEX CAD, Photoshop, and more.

== Products ==
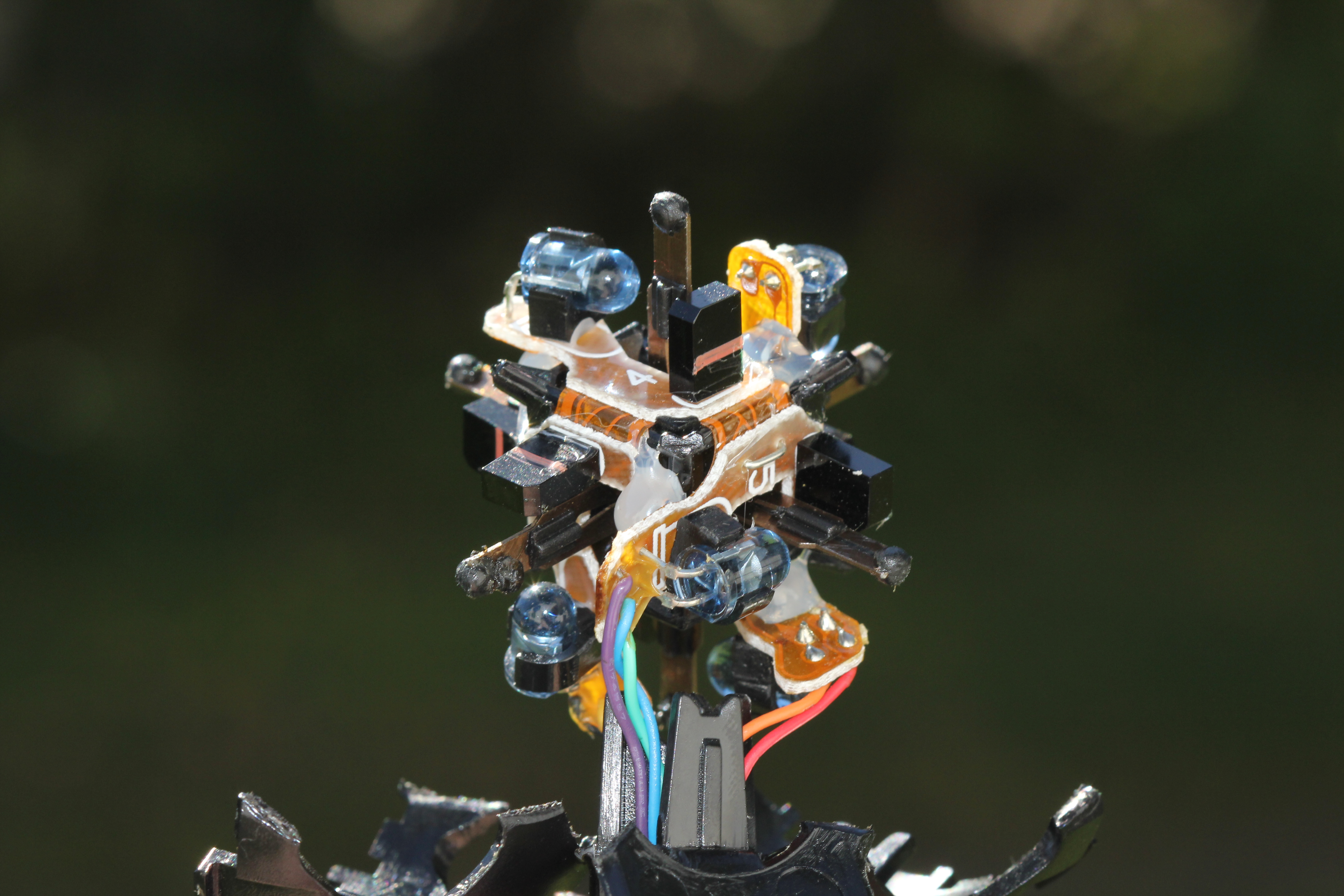
Internal 6-DOF optical sensor assembly of Spaceball 4000 FLX, consisting of infrared LEDs and detectors with occluders that move with the ball

- CadMouse Pro Wireless, CadMouse Pro Wireless Left, CadMouse Pro
- CadMouse Compact Wireless, CadMouse Compact
- SpaceMouse Enterprise
- SpaceMouse Pro Wireless, SpaceMouse Pro
- SpaceMouse Wireless, SpaceMouse Compact
- Keyboard Pro with Numpad

Discontinued products:

- SpaceNavigator, SpaceNavigator for Notebook (Discontinued)
- SpaceExplorer (Discontinued)
- SpacePilot, SpacePilot Pro (Discontinued)
- SpaceTraveler (Discontinued)
- SpaceBall (Discontinued)
- Magellan/SpaceMouse Classic/Plus/XT serial or USB (Discontinued)

== History ==
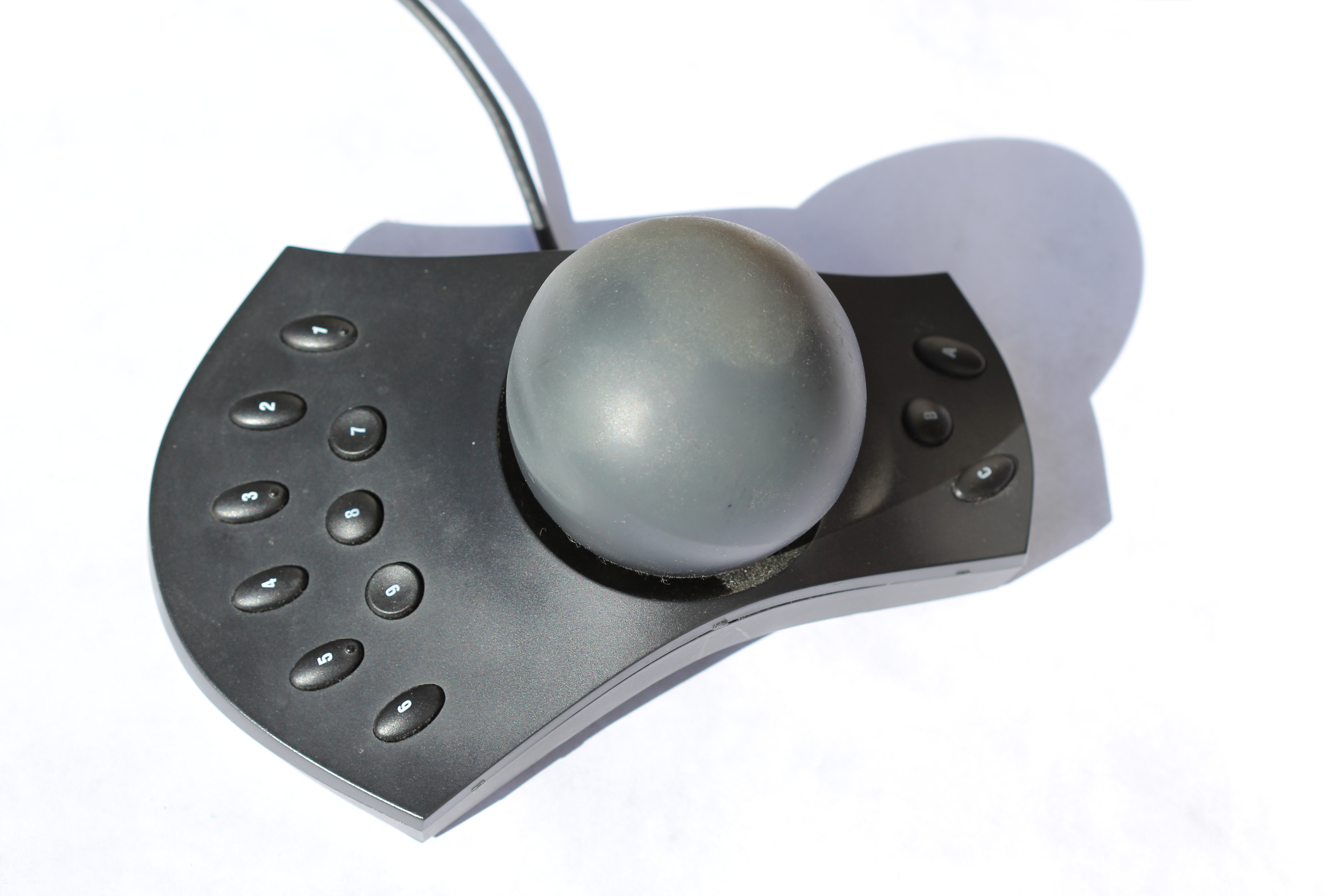
Spaceball 4000 FLX (fabricated in 2000)

3Dconnexion was formed in September 2001 by Logitech, combining LogiCAD3D, based in Europe, and Labtec's 3D peripheral business, based in the United States. The two companies combined have over 20 years of experience in 3D input devices. LogiCAD3D's product, the Magellan controller, was used in fields such as automotive design and aerospace. A NASA project used a Magellan product to control a robot in space. The SpaceBall also had a history in space, having been used to remotely drive the Sojourner robot on Mars.
