= Alter Echo =

2003 video game

- North American Xbox cover art
- Developer: Outrage Games
- Publisher: THQ
- Designer: Andy Crosby
- Programmer: Chris Pfeiffer
- Artist: Matthew Long
- Composer: Jerry Berlongieri
- Platforms: PlayStation 2, Xbox
- Release: NA: August 18, 2003; AU: September 12, 2003; EU: October 3, 2003
- Genre: Action-adventure
- Mode: Single-player

Alter Echo is a third-person action-adventure video game developed by Outrage Games and published by THQ. It was released for the PlayStation 2 and Xbox on August 20, 2003, in North America, September 12 in Australia, and on October 3, 2003, in Europe.

== Plot ==
Alter Echo tells the story of a futuristic world where psychics, known as shapers, can use a special substance called Plast to form anything from weapons to buildings. The world's greatest shaper, Paavo, has made a breakthrough on a faraway planet, creating a new, more powerful Plast called EchoPlast. The player, a young shaper named Nevin, is stranded on the planet with his two friends when Paavo shoots their ship down. The EchoPlast, having achieved sentience, gives Nevin a new EchoPlast suit and tasks him with stopping Paavo from wiping out the entire human race.

== Gameplay ==
Alter Echo is an action-adventure where the player controls Nevin from a third-person perspective. Battle is primarily focused on melee combat, though there is some emphasis on long-range weapons.

In battle, the player can morph Nevin's EchoPlast suit into three different forms. The primary form is the Sword form, which is merely Nevin holding a sword. The Sword form focuses on close-range combat. The second form is the Gun form, which morphs Nevin into a massive, slow-moving, gun-toting humanoid. In this form, Nevin can fire various forms of laser blasts and grenades. The Gun form also possesses an unwieldy melee attack. The final form is the Stealth form, which transforms Nevin into a frog-like creature which walks on all fours. This form can use its tongue in order to grab opponents or items and bring them closer to Nevin. This form also has an optional (though brief) cloaking feature to avoid detection, and Nevin can climb certain kinds of walls. Finally, he can latch onto enemies and unleash devastating melee attacks with his claws.

The game revolves around Nevin trying to free the EchoPlast from Paavo by taking control of various Master Nodes and Sync Nodes. To take control of them, the player must complete a puzzle.

A short period into the game, the player gains access to a time dilation power. By activating it in the presence of one or more enemies, a blank version of the node puzzles is presented to the player. The longer the player can keep the puzzle active, the more damage they will deal when it completes.

As the game progresses, the player earns experience points to improve their combat forms, health, and other attributes. Experience is earned through defeating enemies. Larger experience totals are rewarded when the player is able to string many hits in succession, known as combos. A multiplier is recorded at the top portion of the screen and applied when the player waits too long between attacks. It is applied automatically after reaching a certain point (40 for the Sword form, 35 for the others).

== Reception ==
Reception

Aggregate score
Aggregator	Score	
Aggregator	PS2	Xbox
Metacritic	62/100	62/100

Review scores
Publication	Score	
Publication	PS2	Xbox
Edge	N/A	4/10
Electronic Gaming Monthly	5.67/10	5.67/10
Eurogamer	6/10	N/A
Game Informer	8/10	8/10
GamePro	4/5	N/A
GameRevolution	C−	C−
GameSpot	7.5/10	7.5/10
GameSpy	3/5	N/A
GameZone	7.5/10	7.3/10
IGN	6.8/10	6.8/10
Official U.S. PlayStation Magazine	2/5	N/A
Official Xbox Magazine (US)	N/A	7.5/10
Maxim	3/5	3/5

Alter Echo received "mixed" reviews on both platforms according to the review aggregation website Metacritic. Jeff Gerstmann, writing for GameSpot, commented: "It would have been nice to have seen some more variety in the environments, and the instances of backtracking through areas you've already visited are disappointing. But the game's exciting, free-form combat makes up for those deficiencies."
