= Six degrees of freedom =

Types of movement possible for a rigid body in three-dimensional space

The six degrees of freedom: forward/back, up/down, left/right, yaw, pitch, roll

Ship motions: sign convention for translatory and angular displacements.

Six degrees of freedom (6DOF), or sometimes six degrees of movement, refers to the six mechanical degrees of freedom of movement of a rigid body in three-dimensional space. Specifically, the body is free to change position as forward/backward (surge), up/down (heave), and left/right (sway) translation in three perpendicular axes, combined with changes in orientation through rotation about three perpendicular axes, often termed yaw (normal axis), pitch (transverse axis), and roll (longitudinal axis).

Three degrees of freedom (3DOF), a term often used in the context of virtual reality, typically refers to tracking of rotational motion only: pitch, yaw, and roll.

== Robotics ==
Serial and parallel manipulator systems are generally designed to position an end-effector with six degrees of freedom, consisting of three in translation and three in orientation. This provides a direct relationship between actuator positions and the configuration of the manipulator defined by its forward and inverse kinematics.

Robot arms are described by their degrees of freedom. This is a practical metric, in contrast to the abstract definition of degrees of freedom which measures the aggregate positioning capability of a system.

In 2007, Dean Kamen, inventor of the Segway, unveiled a prototype robotic arm with 14 degrees of freedom for DARPA. Humanoid robots typically have 30 or more degrees of freedom, with six degrees of freedom per arm, five or six in each leg, and several more in torso and neck.

== Engineering ==
The term is important in mechanical systems, especially biomechanical systems, for analyzing and measuring properties of these types of systems that need to account for all six degrees of freedom. Measurement of the six degrees of freedom is accomplished today through both AC and DC magnetic or electromagnetic fields in sensors that transmit positional and angular data to a processing unit. The data is made relevant through software that integrates the data based on the needs and programming of the users.

Mnemonics to remember angle names

The six degrees of freedom of a mobile unit are divided in two motional classes as described below.

Translational envelopes:

1. Moving forward and backward on the X-axis. (Surge)
2. Moving left and right on the Y-axis. (Sway)
3. Moving up and down on the Z-axis. (Heave)

Rotational envelopes:

1. Tilting side to side on the X-axis. (Roll)
2. Tilting forward and backward on the Y-axis. (Pitch)
3. Turning left and right on the Z-axis. (Yaw)

In terms of a headset, such as the kind used for virtual reality, rotational envelopes can also be thought of in the following terms:

- Pitch: Nodding "yes"
- Yaw: Shaking "no"
- Roll: Bobbling from side to side

== Operational envelope types ==
There are three types of operational envelope in the Six degrees of freedom. These types are Direct, Semi-direct (conditional) and Non-direct, all regardless of the time remaining for the execution of the maneuver, the energy remaining to execute the maneuver and finally, if the motion is commanded via a biological entity (e.g. human), a robotical entity (e.g. computer) or both.

1. Direct type: Involved a degree can be commanded directly without particularly conditions and described as a normal operation. (An aileron on a basic airplane)
2. Semi-direct type: Involved a degree can be commanded when some specific conditions are met. (Reverse thrust on an aircraft)
3. Non-direct type: Involved a degree when is achieved via the interaction with its environment and cannot be commanded. (Pitching motion of a vessel at sea)

Transitional type also exists in some vehicles. For example, when the Space Shuttle operated in low Earth orbit, the craft was described as fully-direct-six because in the vacuum of space, its six degrees could be commanded via reaction wheels and RCS thrusters. However, when the Space Shuttle was descending through the Earth's atmosphere for its return, the fully-direct-six degrees were no longer applicable as it was gliding through the air using its wings and control surfaces.

== Game controllers ==
Six degrees of freedom also refers to movement in video game-play.

First-person shooter (FPS) games generally provide five degrees of freedom: forwards/backwards, left/right (strafe), up/down (jump/crouch/prone), yaw (turn left/right), and pitch (look up/down). Some FPS games have leaning control, a partial roll rotation at a set angle for peaking one's gun beside the edge of a wall. Some consider leaning a sixth DOF. Earlier first-person games such as Wolfenstein 3D and Doom lacked pitch rotation, offering only 4 degrees of freedom.

The term 6DOF has sometimes been used to describe games which allow freedom of movement, but do not necessarily meet the full 6DOF criteria. For example, Dead Space 2, and to a lesser extent, Homeworld and Zone Of The Enders allow freedom of movement.

Some examples of true 6DOF games, which allow independent control of all three movement axes and all three rotational axes, include Elite Dangerous, Shattered Horizon, the Descent franchise, the Everspace franchise, Retrovirus, Miner Wars, Space Engineers, Forsaken and Overload (from the same creators of Descent). The space MMO Vendetta Online also features 6 degrees of freedom.

Motion tracking devices such as TrackIR are used for 6DOF head tracking. This device often finds its places in flight simulators and other vehicle simulators that require looking around the cockpit to locate enemies or simply avoiding accidents in-game.

The acronym 3DOF, meaning movement in the three dimensions but not rotation, is sometimes encountered.

The Razer Hydra, a motion controller for PC, tracks position and rotation of two wired nunchucks, providing six degrees of freedom on each hand.

The SpaceOrb 360 is a 6DOF computer input device released in 1996 originally manufactured and sold by the SpaceTec IMC company (first bought by Labtec, which itself was later bought by Logitech). They now offer the 3Dconnexion range of 6DOF controllers, primarily targeting the professional CAD industry.

The controllers sold with HTC VIVE provide 6DOF information by the lighthouse, which adopts Time of Flight (TOF) technology to determine the position of controllers.

== See also ==
- Degrees of freedom (mechanics) – Number of independent parameters needed to define the state of a mechanical system
- Degrees of freedom problem – Multiple ways for multi-joint objects to realize a movement
- Euler angles – Description of the orientation of a rigid body
- Geometric terms of location – Directions or positions relative to the shape and position of an object
- Ship motions – Ships motions as defined by the six degrees of freedom of motion
- Aircraft principal axes – Principal directions in aviation
