= Potentially visible set =

Technique for increasing rendering speed in computer graphics

In 3D computer graphics, Potentially Visible Sets are used to accelerate the rendering of 3D environments. They are a form of occlusion culling, whereby a candidate set of potentially visible polygons are pre-computed, then indexed at run-time in order to quickly obtain an estimate of the visible geometry. The term PVS is sometimes used to refer to any occlusion culling algorithm (since in effect, this is what all occlusion algorithms compute), although in almost all the literature, it is used to refer specifically to occlusion culling algorithms that pre-compute visible sets and associate these sets with regions in space. In order to make this association, the camera's view-space (the set of points from which the camera can render an image) is typically subdivided into (usually convex) regions and a PVS is computed for each region.

== Benefits vs. Cost ==
The benefit of offloading visibility as a pre-process are:

- The application just has to look up the pre-computed set given its view position. This set may be further reduced via frustum culling. Computationally, this is far cheaper than computing occlusion based visibility every frame.
- Within a frame, time is limited. Only 1/60th of a second (assuming a 60 Hz frame-rate) is available for visibility determination, rendering preparation (assuming graphics hardware), AI, physics, or whatever other app specific code is required. In contrast, the offline pre-processing of a potentially visible set can take as long as required in order to compute accurate visibility.

The disadvantages are:

- There are additional storage requirements for the PVS data.
- Preprocessing times may be long or inconvenient.
- Can't be used for completely dynamic scenes.
- The visible set for a region can in some cases be much larger than for a point.

== Primary Problem ==
The primary problem in PVS computation then becomes: Compute the set of polygons that can be visible from anywhere inside each region of a set of polyhedral regions.

There are various classifications of PVS algorithms with respect to the type of visibility set they compute.

=== Conservative algorithms ===
These overestimate visibility consistently, such that no triangle that is visible may be omitted. The net result is that no image error is possible, however, it is possible to greatly overestimate visibility, leading to inefficient rendering (due to the rendering of invisible geometry). The focus on conservative algorithm research is maximizing occluder fusion in order to reduce this overestimation. The list of publications on this type of algorithm is extensive – good surveys on this topic include Cohen-Or et al. and Durand.

=== Aggressive algorithms ===
These underestimate visibility consistently, such that no redundant (invisible) polygons exist in the PVS set, although it may be possible to miss a polygon that is actually visible leading to image errors. The focus on aggressive algorithm research is to reduce the potential error.

=== Approximate algorithms ===
These can result in both redundancy and image error.

=== Exact algorithms ===
These provide optimal visibility sets, where there is no image error and no redundancy. They are, however, complex to implement and typically run a lot slower than other PVS based visibility algorithms. Teller computed exact visibility for a scene subdivided into cells and portals (see also portal rendering).

The first general tractable 3D solutions were presented in 2002 by Nirenstein et al. and Bittner. Haumont et al. improve on the performance of these techniques significantly. Bittner et al. solve the problem for 2.5D urban scenes. Although not quite related to PVS computation, the work on the 3D Visibility Complex and 3D Visibility Skeleton by Durand provides an excellent theoretical background on analytic visibility.

Visibility in 3D is inherently a 4-Dimensional problem. To tackle this, solutions are often performed using Plücker coordinates, which effectively linearize the problem in a 5D projective space. Ultimately, these problems are solved with higher-dimensional constructive solid geometry.

== Secondary Problems ==
Some interesting secondary problems include:

- Compute an optimal sub-division in order to maximize visibility culling.
- Compress the visible set data in order to minimize storage overhead.

== Implementation Variants ==
- It is often undesirable or inefficient to simply compute triangle level visibility. Graphics hardware prefers objects to be static and remain in video memory. Therefore, it is generally better to compute visibility on a per-object basis and to sub-divide any objects that may be too large individually. This adds conservativity, but the benefit is better hardware utilization and compression (since visibility data is now per-object, rather than per-triangle).
- Computing cell or sector visibility is also advantageous, since by determining visible regions of space, rather than visible objects, it is possible to not only cull out static objects in those regions, but dynamic objects as well.
