= Forsaken (video game) =

1998 video game

- European cover art
- Developers: Probe Entertainment (PC & PS); Iguana UK (N64); Nightdive Studios (remaster)
- Publishers: Acclaim Entertainment; Nightdive Studios (remaster)
- Directors: Andy Squirrell (PC & PS); Guy Miller (N64)
- Engine: KEX Engine (remaster)
- Platforms: Microsoft Windows, PlayStation, Nintendo 64, Linux, macOS, Xbox One
- Release: Windows: NA: 24 April 1998; UK: 15 May 1998; PlayStation: NA: 12 May 1998; UK: 15 May 1998; Nintendo 64: UK: 22 May 1998; NA: 26 May 1998; Windows, Linux, macOS, Xbox One; 31 July 2018 (remaster)
- Genre: Shooter game
- Modes: Single-player, multiplayer

Forsaken is a 1998 shooter video game developed by Probe Entertainment and published by Acclaim Entertainment. It was released for Microsoft Windows and PlayStation, with a port to the Nintendo 64 developed by Iguana UK releasing the same year as Forsaken 64.

A high-definition remaster developed by Nightdive Studios was released in 2018 for Microsoft Windows, macOS, Linux and Xbox One. The Nintendo 64 version was released on the Nintendo Classics service via the Mature 17+ app in 2025.

== Gameplay ==
Forsaken is a 3D shooter in the style of Descent (1995), featuring similar weapons, power-ups, having missiles and mines being labeled "secondary weapons", and involving 3D movement of a vehicle through several tunnels. It is set on a futuristic Earth that, in 2113, had all of its life destroyed as a result of a shockwave from a science accident. The goal of the game differs between formats. In the PC and PlayStation versions, the player acts as someone trying to obtain the planet's lost treasure, while in the Nintendo 64 release, the goal is to kill looters finding the treasure. There are also elements of Quake.

The single-player mode has four difficulty modes: easy, normal, hard and total mayhem. Each has progressively stronger enemies and less ammo to spare. Due to the near-impossible challenge presented by the four modes, Acclaim provided the patch 1.00 that (among other things) decreased the difficulty of the game dramatically. There are 22 missions, each requiring the player to either destroy all enemy ships in a maze of tunnels, or achieve a certain target, such as completing within a time limit and/or at a specific percentage of enemies murdered. Similar to Starfox 64 (1997), different paths appear depending on which targets were achieved.

There are six different types of multiplayer games: Free for All (deathmatch), Team Game, Capture the Flag, Flag Chase, Bounty Hunt, and Team Bounty Hunt. There are various sub-options for each. Up to 16 players can join in on the PC version, four on the Nintendo 64, and two for the PlayStation. Also on the Nintendo 64 version, a maximum of three computer players can join. The PC version also has the ability to record demos.

== Development ==
The game was developed by Probe Entertainment during the 1996–1998 period as the company became merged into its parent company (Acclaim). At that time, Microsoft's newly bought and re-branded rendering layer (DirectX) had just started to dominate PC development.

Fergus McGovern headed the development team. The game was heavily technology driven at the beginning and was titled ProjectX. This was changed to Condemned when the story elements were added although it was later changed to Forsaken due to a potential naming conflict.

A Sega Saturn version of the game was announced, but canceled as part of Acclaim's general withdrawal of support for the system.

Due to the heavy technology focus of the game, it was often bundled with hardware to show off the graphic cards, and was used as a benchmark for many years after its initial release.

The Swarm (Dominic Glynn and Stephen Root) performed and produced the Forsaken soundtrack which features dynamic drum and bass and electronica tracks. An album featuring many of the original tracks and remixes was released on No Bones Records.

Various employees of Acclaim Studios Teesside, the developer who worked on the Nintendo 64 port of the game, made plans for a sequel to Forsaken, which were permanently scrapped when Acclaim closed the studio down in 2002.

== Reception ==
Reception

Aggregate score
Aggregator	Score		
Aggregator	N64	PC	PS
GameRankings	75%	80%	75%

Review scores
Publication	Score		
Publication	N64	PC	PS
CNET Gamecenter	7/10	8/10	8/10
Computer Games Strategy Plus	N/A	3/5	N/A
Computer Gaming World	N/A	4/5	N/A
Electronic Gaming Monthly	6.25/10 (Note: Two critics of Electronic Gaming Monthly gave the Nintendo 64 version each a score of 6/10, and two others gave it each a score of 6.5/10.)	N/A	5.625/10 (Note: Two critics of Electronic Gaming Monthly gave the PlayStation version each a score of 6/10, one gave it 4/10, and another gave it 6.5/10.)
Famitsu	N/A	N/A	24/40
Game Informer	8/10	9/10	8/10
GameFan	N/A	N/A	91% (Note: In GameFan's viewpoint of the PlayStation version, three critics gave it each a score of 88, 96, and 90.)
GameRevolution	B	B	C
GameSpot	8.5/10	8.9/10	6.4/10
IGN	8/10	8.5/10	8/10
N64 Magazine	87%	N/A	N/A
Next Generation	3/5	3/5	3/5
Nintendo Power	7.9/10	N/A	N/A
Official U.S. PlayStation Magazine	N/A	N/A	4/5
PC Gamer (US)	N/A	89%	N/A

The game received favorable reviews on all platforms according to the review aggregation website GameRankings. In Japan, where the PlayStation version was ported and published by Acclaim Japan on 2 September 1999, Famitsu gave it a score of 24 out of 40.

Paul Biondich of AllGame gave the PC version four-and-a-half stars out of five and argued that although its gameplay was uninventive, its PC version, with its use of "3D Accelerator" [graphics card] and Direct3D, has "utterly impressive technical savvy and attention to detail" few other games had achieved. He highlighted "the quality and generous use of real-time colored lighting effects", "the screen blistering frame rates", explosions, the detail of enemy ships, and smoke trails of missiles.

Lighting effects were highlighted in reviews of all versions. Martin Kitts of N64 Magazine called the lighting effects the best on the Nintendo 64, "giving heated battles a pleasant lava lamp effect, with shots and explosions bouncing around the room in slow motion." The game's intense action was well-received, but the difficulty was occasionally considered excessive. Kitts explained the N64 port's first stage "will leave most players cold, soon turning into a tedious slog around a nondescript 360° maze".

Forsaken's PC release significantly exceeded expectations for Joel Durham, writing for the American edition of PC Gamer. He expected another PC title that emphasized 3D acceleration effects over gameplay, a la G-Police (1997) and Terracide (1997).

Edge gave the PlayStation version eight out of ten in its June 1998 issue, stating that, although it feels familiar to Descent, it refined and updated the formula with features such as its auto-levelling system and orientation aid. An issue later, the magazine gave Forsaken 64 eight out of ten, saying, "With luck, programming of this calibre can become an expectation for all N64 titles developed across multiple formats." Dan Toose of Hyper gave the game 92% and said: "Unless someone pulls some wonder game out of the bag at E3, this one looks like it's going to be the all-formats game of the year. If you like action shooter games, this is a must-have".

Kitts gave the N64 version 87% and compared it to Quake and Descent (1995), as well as 2D shooters such as R-Type (1987) and Axelay (1992). He called it the best "serious" Nintendo 64 title since GoldenEye, and "a game that, although not for the fainthearted, holds a genuinely rewarding experience for those who are prepared to persevere". He wrote that the game's best moments were those that required thinking, although did enjoy the more intense parts, such as enemies popping up behind the player and shots from guns hidden in alcoves. Despite the use of static, non-animated character models, he called the visuals impressive nonetheless. He enjoyed how enemy ships, when destroyed, spin out of control, fire random shots, and occasionally dive on the player, adding to the fast-paced gameplay. He also highlighted there being no fogging in the four-playing mode. It did take a little bit of time for him to appreciate the game, however; he was critical of the default control system. He also was disappointed in the multiplayer mode, writing it was hard to tell players from each other and that weapons barely took off hit points of other players, resulting in overly-long matches.

Boba Fatt of GamePro described the N64 version as an "endless maze of frustration" wasting "excellent control and four-player split-screen capability". He criticized the lack of radar, which made it difficult to look for the other players in multi-player, and made single-player a chore: "You'll run in perpetual circles looking for your objective or final enemy until you either memorize the level or pass out. Even worse, the unimaginative bad guys blend right into the background, and every level looks just like the previous one." (Note: GamePro gave the Nintendo 64 version 3.5/5 for graphics, 3/5 for sound, 4.5/5 for control, and 2/5 for fun factor.) Fatt also said that the PlayStation version's "sharp environmental detail and spectacular real-time lighting effects are just window dressing for a poorly devised game. Unfortunately, bland enemies, derivative gameplay, and squeaky, unappealing sound effects (laser fire on helium—anyone remember Atari's Phoenix?) run rampant." (Note: GamePro gave the PlayStation version 3.5/5 for graphics, 2.5/5 for sound, 1.5/5 for control, and 2/5 for fun factor.)

Next Generation said in its July 1998 issue that the N64 version was "solid, enjoyable stuff with not a hint of originality to cloud the fun"; and called the PlayStation version "a decent title. Probe has mixed together the best elements of Descent and Quake and added some pretty tricky enemy AI, resulting in a game that shines, although in slightly different ways, on each platform." An issue later, the magazine called the PC version "a good game that will provide a nice distraction until players get their hands on the big guns like Sin, Half-Life, and Duke Nukem Forever."
