= Terracide =

1997 video game

- Developer: Simis
- Publisher: Eidos Interactive
- Writers: Simon Carless; Phil Marley; Michael McHale; Laurence Scotford
- Platform: Microsoft Windows
- Release: 27 August 1997
- Genre: Action
- Modes: Single player, multiplayer

Terracide is a 1997 first-person shooter developed by Simis and published by Eidos Interactive for Microsoft Windows. Players control a spaceship to defend Earth from a force of mutant human and robot colonists, who have returned to invade the planet. The game was developed to take advantage of the rise in video cards using 3D accelerators and 3DFX, and it was distributed with many video cards. Upon release, Terracide received average reviews, with critics praising its 3D capabilities and performance, although many compared it to a similar title, Descent, and critiqued its controls and level design.

== Gameplay ==
The visuals and effects of Terracide were designed for video cards that supported 3D acceleration, and received praise.

Gameplay in Terracide is set over a series of missions in which players infiltrate a ship and must complete various objectives, such as to locate and destroy the ship's computers, ventilation or defences. Navigation is assisted by the HUD, which includes an animated compass and sensors for nearby weapons and power-ups. Players engage in combat with several weapon options: phasers, a chain gun, rockets, guided missiles, and a flare gun to light darkened areas. Bombs can also be used with different effects, such as bouncing towards the target, drawing enemies towards players, or teleporting the enemy away from their location. Up to three weapons can be used at a time, with offensive weapons increasing in levels of firepower when the same weapon is collected, and available in single, scatter, or rapid-fire shots. Weapons are left behind by defeated enemies. Terracide supports multiplayer play for up to 16 players over a LAN or online using the MPlayer client. Multiplayer modes include Deathmatch, Co-op, and Capture the Flag.

== Plot ==
In the New Age, the Terran Colonies set out across the galaxy to find new planets to live. Over time, their existence on harsh alien worlds has led the colonists to adapt to planetary conditions through biological and technological mutations. Now returning home, the colonists bring a floatilla of ships, each hosting a crew of mutated humans, robots and alients, to conquer Earth. Players assusme the role of a pilot who is tasked to infiltrate the ships of the invading fleet of marauders.

== Development ==
Terracide was developed by Simis Limited initially under publisher Domark in 1995, under the working title Berzerker. In 1996, Domark merged with Eidos PLC to create Eidos Interactive. Eidos showcased Terracide at E3 in May 1996. It was one of the earliest titles in development to widely support cards with 3D acceleration using Direct3D and 3DFX, featuring techniques such as hardware smoothing, bilinear filtering, transluency, reflections and real-time light sourcing. Following the release of a game demo in June 1997, publications anticipated the 3D capabilities of Terracide and praised its visual fidelity. To demonstrate its capabilities, demos of Terracide were bundled with video cards, and Eidos distributed a computer benchmarking tool based on the game named Terramark. The game was the last completed by Simis for Eidos before buying themselves out of the company.

== Reviews ==
Reception

Review scores
Publication	Score
Computer Games Strategy Plus	2.5/5
Computer Gaming World	1.5/5
GameSpot	6.8/10
PC Format	76%
PC Games (US)	B+
PC PowerPlay	65%
PC Zone	8.2/10

Many reviewers praised the visuals and performance of Terracide, with PC PowerPlay stating they featured the "some of most incredibly in-depth graphics" available for 3D accelerators due to its wide support for supporting cards. Tim Royal of Computer Games Strategy Plus similarly stated the game featured some of the best visuals to date due to its lighting and effects, although found aspects "jarring", writing that it "profoundly utilizes all of the latest fads in technology as if each one were being revealed for the first time". Mark Clarkson of Computer Gaming World enjoyed the effects and fast frame rates, but critiqued the game's engine, textures and collision. Some reviews expressed that the game's visuals were impressive but masked a lack of gameplay depth.

The gameplay of Terracide received an average reception. David Bradley of PC Format enjoyed the handling and weapons of the player's spacecraft and the varied mission design. Shane Mooney of PC Games praised the number of levels and ships on offer, and the differing mission objectives. In contrast, George Soropos of PC PowerPlay considered its handling was unforgiving and uncontrollable, stating he "never felt comfortable playing the game". Similarly, Stephen Poole of Gamespot praised the weapon types and multiplayer options, but found the controls "almost impossible" to line up regardless of keyboard or joystick use.

Many critics wrote that the plot and design of Terracide was derivative from Descent, with critics mixed on whether the title was an improvement on its genre predecessor: some agreed, and most felt it was not. Many reviewers critiqued the game's level design. Describing the gameplay and levels as uninspired, Clarkson was apathetic about the game due to its "lack of design, lack of quality control [and] lack of attention to detail". Bradley also stated the level design fell flat and lacked atmosphere, and Soropos described the levels as unoriginal, "claustrophobic and boring".
