= Descent II =

1996 video game

- Developers: Parallax Software; Interplay Productions (Mac); R-Comp Interactive (Risc OS)
- Publishers: Interplay Productions; Mac Play (Mac); R-Comp Interactive (Risc OS)
- Directors: Mike Kulas; Matt Toschlog
- Producer: Rusty Buchert
- Designers: Jasen Whiteside; Mark Dinse; Che-Yuan Wang
- Programmers: Matt Toschlog; Mike Kulas; John Slagel; Jason Leighton; Che-Yuan Wang
- Artists: Adam Pletcher; Jasen Whiteside; Doug Brooks
- Writer: Ryan Garcia
- Composers: Dan Wentz; Brian Luzietti; Larry Peacock; Leslie Spitzer; Jim Torres; Tim Wiles
- Platforms: MS-DOS; Mac OS; PlayStation; RISC OS; Windows
- Release: MS-DOS: NA: March 13, 1996; EU: March 29, 1996; Mac OS: NA: August 1996; PlayStation: NA: May 15, 1997; EU: Mid-1997; RISC OS: WW: May 19, 2001
- Genre: First-person shooter
- Modes: Single-player, multiplayer

Descent II is a 1996 first-person shooter game developed by Parallax Software and first published for MS-DOS by Interplay Productions. A version for the PlayStation was released under the title Descent Maximum. It is the second installment in the Descent video game series and the sequel to Descent. Like its predecessor, the player controls a spaceship from the pilot's perspective and must navigate extrasolar underground mines to locate and destroy their reactors and escape being caught in their self-destructions, while engaging and surviving infected robots, which will attempt to destroy the ship. Unlike other first-person shooters, its six-degrees-of-freedom scheme allows the player to move and rotate in any three-dimensional space and direction.

Descent II started as a project intended to expand the original using a compact disc's storage, and later became a standalone product, using an upgraded version of its predecessor's graphics engine. The game received very positive reviews from video game critics, who widely lauded the multiplayer mode and the inclusion of the Guide-Bot, a scouting robot that guides the player to their objectives. The PlayStation version's reception was rather mixed, with critics often disagreeing in their evaluations of its frame rate. A sequel, Descent 3, was released in 1999.

== Gameplay ==
After finding and freeing it, the Guide-Bot can then be used to locate and lead the player to many points of the level. In this case, it is directing the player to the blue key, the player's current objective. From top-left counterclockwise, the HUD comprises the extra life counter, a missile lock alarm, an afterburner energy gauge, an energy bar, the primary weapons window, a status indicator of the player ship's shields, the secondary weapons window, a bomb counter, and the current score.

Like its predecessor, Descent I, Descent II is a six-degrees-of-freedom shoot 'em up game in which the player pilots a fighter spaceship from a first-person perspective in zero gravity. It differs from standard first-person shooters in that it allows the player to move freely across three-dimensional planes and rotate on three axes, often termed pitch, yaw, and roll. Besides the keyboard, Descent II features a wide range of supported hardware configurations with which to play it, including the Gravis Gamepad and certain brands of joysticks, some of which support force feedback—making it one of the earliest PC games to support force feedback. Virtual reality and stereoscopic graphics are also officially supported.

In the game's single-player mode, the player must complete four levels in each of six differently themed star systems where different types of robots attempt to hinder the player's progress. In each level, the player must find and blow up the mine's reactor and then escape the mine through an exit door before the mine self-destructs. The exit door is always open after the blowing up of the reactor and upon the mine meltdown countdown. Every fourth level has a boss robot that replaces the reactor. Each level is composed of rooms separated by doors, most of which can be opened by shooting or bumping into them. Some other doors are colored blue, yellow, or red and require a key of the corresponding color to be opened. In addition to brightening passages by shooting flares or turning on a headlight if the latter has been picked up, at least three measures can be used to prevent getting lost in the mines, two of which are using a wireframe automap that documents all explored areas of the mine and dropping markers in certain locations. The markers are displayed on the automap. Along the way, the player may also find and free a Guide-Bot, a commandable scouting assistant that guides the player to a specified objective or powerup. Additionally, many stages have human hostages that award an additional point bonus if they are rescued before completing the level. Levels may contain energy stations the player can fly through to recharge their ship's energy banks, as well as generators that spawn more robots. Added in Descent II are control panels that, when shot, trigger the following events, such as doors opening, walls removed, or force fields deactivated. The game features 30 levels, 24 (four fifths or 80%) of which are regular levels and six (one fifth or 20%) of which are secret levels. In some levels, behind some hidden doors, there are teleporters that warp the player to the current star system's secret level. The secret levels are not required to complete the game but contain many power-ups, and can be revisited when their reactors are still intact and the teleporters are discovered. Players cannot save the game in the secret level, and have to teleport back to the regular level in order to save their game progress.

Within each level, the player may find and collect power-ups scattered throughout the mine or dropped by dying robots. Many of the power-ups expand the ship's weaponry, which is divided into primary and secondary weapons. Primary weapons range from a variety of pulse lasers and plasma bolts, and all of them consume energy in varying increments from the ship's energy banks, except for two rotary cannons whose ammunition consists of explosive shells instead. Secondary weapons include many types of missiles, and mines which are dropped behind the player's ship to slow pursuing enemies. Ten new weapons have been added for Descent II, some of which are upgrades from the original Descent weapons, which are all present as well; new weapons include the Phoenix cannon which fires energy orbs that rebound off walls, the Omega cannon which fires electrostatic discharge, the Flash Missile which blinds robots and players for two seconds and creates a ringing sound, and the Guided Missile which can be remote piloted by the player. The player can also collect equipment items which grant special capabilities. For example, a converter exists for converting the energy in the excess of 100 units into the shield, whereas the afterburner allows the player to temporarily fly forward twice as fast.

The player's ship is protected by a shield which decreases when incurring damage from attacks and collisions with force fields, is replenished by picking up shield power-ups, and like energy is limited by a capacity of 200 units. If the shield is fully depleted and the ship takes any additional damage, the ship will explode, costing the player one life and killing any hostages on board, leaving most of its weapons where it was destroyed. A respawning player has to start at the level entrance with a ship having only minimum armaments, so it is often challenging to retrieve their previous ship's weapons. New to Descent II is the ability to drop weapons, so a player can stockpile surplus weaponry in safe locations in the event of a respawn. Being too late to escape the mine during the self-destruct sequence will also cost the player a life, as well as their power-ups and any hostages embarked, and will also give the player no bonus scores, although having destroyed the reactor or boss robot the player will still advance to the next level. If the player loses all lives, the game will end, and their high scores are recorded. Players receive points for defeating robots, rescuing the hostages, and end-of-level bonuses based on the player's performance with score multipliers for escaping the mine; scoring enough points results in an extra life.

=== Difficulty modes ===
Like Descent I, Descent II is played in one of five difficulty modes: Trainee (easy), Rookie (normal), Hotshot (hard), Ace (very hard) and Insane (very very hard). As the difficulty increases, robots become smarter and fire more projectiles and more rapidly and face better evasion. With higher difficulties, the player has fewer concussion missiles at the beginning (seven in Trainee, six in Rookie, five in Hotshot, four in Ace and three in Insane). Energy and shield power-ups are worth fewer points with increasing difficulties (27 in Trainee, 15 in Rookie, 12 in Hotshot, nine in Ace and six in Insane). Meltdown countdowns become shorter with higher difficulties (generally 90 seconds in Trainee, 60 seconds in Rookie, 45 seconds in Hotshot, 35 seconds in Ace and 30 seconds in Insane). Beginning with Hotshot, players get skill bonuses at the end of each mine.

==== Robot generators ====
Robot generators debut or first appear in Level 2. They generate robots in a number of waves depending on the difficulty level. Higher difficulties generate more robots. In the Insane difficulty, robot generators generate an unlimited number of robots after becoming active.

=== Multiplayer mode ===
Descent II also features a multiplayer mode whereby two to eight players can compete against each other in several game types, which include a deathmatch mode called Anarchy and Capture-the-Flag, in which two teams compete against each other to capture opposing flags. Conditions for ending the level such as maximum time limit, how long the reactor will remain invulnerable before it can be destroyed, and the number of kills to reach can be set, as can which power-ups to allow and whether players may drop surveillance cameras. The game also features a co-operative mode that allows up to four players to work together to complete single-player levels. A player can send messages and predefined taunts, handicap their ship's shields they begin with after respawning, and in Capture-the-Flag drop and pass flags to their teammates. Descent II's multiplayer was designed for modems, null-modems, and local area networks, but an alternative then widely used is to use third-party software such as Kali to play the game on the Internet. It is possible to have DOS and Macintosh versions of the game play on the same server, providing a cross-platform experience. The PlayStation version has a two-player mode that requires a link cable used to connect two consoles running the same game. It contains the same game modes as found in the original DOS version, except for Capture-the-Flag.

== Plot ==
The plot is linear and is mostly provided for the introductory and concluding full-motion video cutscenes. After the "Material Defender" (voiced by George DelHoyo) has destroyed all of the Solar System's mines in the original game, he stops in the asteroid belt to dock. He is then contacted by Post-Terran Mining Corporation executive Dravis, who exploits a loophole in a contract to coerce him to accept a new mission or forfeit his reward and face legal action. The Material Defender consents, and as Dravis tries to convince him that he is merely embarking on a reconnaissance mission, his ship is fitted with a prototype warp core. He is then sent to clear out PTMC's deep space mines beyond the Solar System.

The Material Defender teleports to Zeta Aquilae and five other, fictional star systems and destroys their mines. In the sixth system, the last mine seems to run all through a planetoid, which is revealed in the final cutscene to be a large spaceship. After the spaceship breaks apart, the Material Defender alerts Dravis to his return home, but his warp drive malfunctions and he teleports to an unknown location. The camera then fades to that location and the ship appears, heavily damaged and crackling with excess radiation drifting towards the camera, ending with the words "to be continued..." being displayed.

== Development ==
Parallax Software began Descent II's development as an expansion pack for the original Descent game using a CD's storage, but it later evolved into a separate project lasting about one year. Descent II's graphics were upgraded to operate at Super VGA standards, and can also take advantage of 3D acceleration graphics cards. The MIDI soundtrack was composed by Dan Wentz, whereas the included redbook features industrial metal contributed by notable musicians such as Type O Negative and Ogre of Skinny Puppy. It cost $500,000 to produce the game.

Descent II's portal engine remained fundamentally unchanged; it operates on the premise of adjacent cubes or polyhedra whose sides connecting them form portals. The scenes that are drawn are the cube the player ship is in and the areas of other cubes the camera can see through their portals, and the process is repeated as the player enters a different polyhedron. Cubes can be deformed so long as they remain convex. Respectively, these prevent overdraw and accelerate portal rendering, making the engine practical to run on even inexpensive personal computers of that time. The preceding Descent introduced a dynamic light-sourcing scheme by which the environment could be lit with flares, while newly added in Descent II is the ability to shoot out sources of light which will darken rooms as well as a headlight powerup which can continuously illuminate the space in front of the player.

The game's directors, Mike Kulas and Matt Toschlog, explained they upgraded the game's artificial intelligence to contain instructions mimicking the tactics they saw players use in multiplayer mode, such as dodging behind walls and sneaking up from behind. The C-written code composing the AI was expanded to about 4,000 lines, a task the two described as being difficult.

=== Releases ===
The Descent II demo was released in December 1995, becoming one of the most downloaded PC games in January 1996. Unlike the preceding Descent, whose shareware release could be upgraded to the full version while leaving the existing shareware files intact, such as player saves, the Descent II demo was a self-contained program that was not upgradable to the full version. Like the original Descent, the demo version of Descent II presented the story as still screens with text and also used the in-game engine for the mine escape sequence; however, the full version replaced all of these with full-motion video pre-rendered cutscenes incorporating voice acting. The demo features eight of ten weapons from the first Descent and six of ten weapons from the full Descent II. The Descent II demo featured the first three regular levels of the game (the teleporter to the secret level was disabled); after completing the third level, the player moves from Zeta Aquilae to a new star system with the story to be continued. The full release (see below) adds a fourth regular level with a boss in lieu of the reactor, as well as the secret level to the Zeta Aquilae system, making it in line with the next five star systems (each has four regular levels plus a secret level), for a total of 30 levels.

The full base Descent II game was published for DOS by Interplay in the United States on March 13, 1996, and in the United Kingdom on March 29, 1996. It was co-distributed by LaserSoft Imaging, whom Interplay gave the rights as part of a settlement after the former lost a court battle regarding its product add-on for the first Descent game, which Interplay alleged infringed its trademark—setting a precedent for how companies can sell add-ons for protected games. Interplay's division specified in Macintosh games, MacPlay, published it for Macintosh in August 1996.

Descent II: Destination Quartzon was a truncated version with the first eight regular levels and two secret levels (constituting the first and second star systems, "Zeta Aquilae" and "Quartzon"). Not compatible with the Descent II full release, Destination Quartzon was bundled software with hardware such as the Logitech WingMan Extreme joystick and Diamond Multimedia video cards with the Voodoo Graphics chipset.

In November 1996 came Descent II: The Infinite Abyss, a Windows 95 upgrade that supports 3D accelerated graphics, contains The Vertigo Series add-on, and the original DOS game patched to support accelerated graphics. The Vertigo Series, which could be purchased separately, contains 22 new levels (to be played sequentially), a new multiplayer game mode, new music and enemies. The add-on is also bundled with the Mission Builder, a level and robot editor that can also convert the original Descent's levels for this game.

The PlayStation version of Descent II, known as Descent Maximum, was launched on May 15, 1997, in North America and in mid-1997 in Europe. Instead of a straight port, it had 36 new levels, textures and full-motion video over the PC version of Descent II.

On October 29, 1997, Interplay published Descent I and II: The Definitive Collection, a compilation containing the full versions of Descent, the Levels of the World mission pack, Descent II, and Vertigo mission packs, and a mission editor. Besides a choice of the original Descent II levels (subtitled Counterstrike), or the Vertigo Series levels, the first Descent levels (subtitled The First Strike) can be started in the Descent II game UI where robots adopt the Descent II sounds and improved AI. There is also a preview for the upcoming Descent 3.

In 1998, the Descent II source code, like that of Descent before it, was released to the general public under a copyrighted proprietary license, leading to community source ports. It was later ported to RISC OS by R-Comp Interactive, and the port debuted at the annual Wakefield Acorn RISC OS Show on May 19, 2001.

Descent II entered digital distribution when it appeared on GameTap on September 7, 2006. It subsequently became one of the launch titles of the Good Old Games beta on September 8, 2008, and on February 19, 2014, it was re-released on Valve's Steam digital distribution service. However, the Descent trilogy was withdrawn from Good Old Games in December 2015 after its creators, Mike Kulas and Matt Toschlog, alleged that Interplay, who owns the Descent trademark but not the copyright of the trilogy, had not paid the developers royalties on their sale since 2007. As a result, Parallax terminated the 21-year sales agreement, revoking from Interplay the permission to distribute the trilogy. Later, the games were also removed from Steam. The trilogy returned on Good Old Games for sale in November 2017 and later on Steam.

== Reception ==
Reception

Aggregate scores
Aggregator	Score
GameRankings	74% (PS)
Metacritic	89/100 (DOS)

Review scores
Publication	Score
Computer Game Review	291/300 (DOS)
Computer Gaming World	4/5 (DOS)
Electronic Gaming Monthly	5.25/10 (PS)
Game Players	7.0/10 (PS)
GameRevolution	B (MAC)
GameSpot	9.2/10 (DOS); 5.4/10 (PS)
IGN	7.5/10 (PS)
MacLife	3/4 (MAC)
Macworld	7.7/10 (MAC)
Next Generation	4/5 (DOS, MAC); 3/5 (PS)
PC Gamer (US)	88% (DOS)
PC PowerPlay	9/10 (DOS)
PC Zone	90% (DOS)
PCMag	4/4 (DOS)
Maximum	5/5 (DOS)
GameLand	6/10 (PS)
PC Review	8/10 (DOS)
Total Games Network	93% (DOS)

Upon release, Descent II received very positive reviews from video game critics. Citing its replay value, GameSpot commented: "If you don't like Descent at least a little bit, make no mistake, there is something wrong with you." Next Generation opined that a few sequels "can boast the improvements like those made on Descent II", citing the SVGA graphics, the story sequences in full motion video, and the new items. It forgave the same simple mission formula because of the improvements. Computer Gaming World compared the gameplay and enhancements of the sequel to those of Doom II, but complained about the graininess of the textures, and the two magazines warned that players who did not care for the original might not care for the sequel either.

The addition of the Guide-Bot was well received. In a very positive review, PC Magazine considered it to be a valuable addition to the game "because the automap is just as confusing as it was in the original game". Conversely, PC Review felt the Guide-Bot ran contrary to the disorienting character of the series and that the Guide-Bot diminished the need to use strategy, but did write that using the robot was optional. Computer Game Review liked the AI of the new cast of robots in general and other measures taken to prevent getting lost, such as plotting map positions with markers. The multiplayer mode was also widely lauded. Computer Games Magazine called the Capture-the-Flag mode "intensely enjoyable", but expressed concerns about the lack of outdoor levels (these were added in the game's sequel, Descent 3, released in 1999). Other critics differed in how they analyzed the level design. PC PowerPlay strongly praised the scenery and the combination of maneuvers, including shooting while strafing and turning, with the "adventurous" style of the levels. While calling the levels innovative, PC Gamer found there to be too many "claustrophobic" and labyrinthine levels. The latter view was disputed by PC Zone, who described the levels as being more "complex and overlapping" compared to the original's, which it described were focused on "winding tunnels, tiny chambers, huge caverns which lead to micro alleyways, long cramped corridors [etc.]". However, the two magazines agreed that the levels were too hard on easier difficulty settings. PC Zone also praised support for virtual reality. Maximum wrote that the levels retained the 3D sensations and "ingenious structural design", but asserted the game's difficulty was made less frustrating because of the abundance of shield orbs, the inclusion of powerful weapons, and the ability to transfer energy to shields. Total Games Network described the music when played on a stereo system as a "veritable sonic maelstrom."

Reviews for the Macintosh version iterated many critical points found in those for the DOS version. Making similar comments about this version as the ones about Descent II for DOS, Next Generation noted it as an unusual case of a Macintosh port releasing shortly after the DOS version. GameRevolution enthusiastically lauded the graphics and the fluidity of the animations, its only criticism being the complexity of controlling the ship using only the keyboard and not a joystick. It thus highly recommended using one, and also suggested that a direction indicator would have helped beginners become adjusted to the controls. Macworld judged the graphics to be "extremely detailed and well rendered", but noted that some smaller robots resembled origami. MacADDICT wrote that the use of animated textures by the levels' new settings brought about a realistic alien world. It also put forth criticisms specifically for the Macintosh version, such as the high system requirements for the Power Mac and freezes that can lead to corrupt player files, which can be prevented by turning off all of the nonessential system extensions. The two aforementioned reviewers cautioned about the game's potential to induce motion sickness, but ultimately recommended it.

The PlayStation version received rather mixed reviews. Most of the critics praised the artificial intelligence. The most negative reviews came from Glenn Rubenstein of GameSpot and Shawn Smith of Electronic Gaming Monthly, both of whom said they disliked the entire Descent series and its basic concept of 3D navigation in levels which have no clear "up" or "down", as well as GameFan, which lambasted the habitual inferiority of PlayStation ports of good PC games. Smith and his three co-reviewers all criticized the choppy frame rate, though Crispin Boyer noted that the problem is largely eliminated when playing with the cockpit displays on. Both Boyer and Dan Hsu praised the additions over the original Descent, such as the Guide-Bot and the new lighting effects. Both GameFan and Dmitry Reznikov of GameLand lauded all of the PC version's improvements included in the port, but the former reported an average rate of ten frames per second that would drop even lower with the cockpit displays disabled, and the latter believed that the frame rate drops cost an otherwise straight port of the PC version the opportunity to become a PlayStation hit. Rubenstein disputed the criticisms of the frame rate, which he called smooth, and GamePro said the frame rate only drops when the action is at its most intense. He praised the additions to the original Descent such as the FMV cutscenes, the Guide-Bot, and the Thief-Bot. Next Generation was also pleased with these elements, summarizing that the game "features just enough improvements to the aging series to make it a welcome addition to the fold". However, it judged that the Descent series lacked the intensity and mood of competitors such as Doom and Quake. These views were echoed by Roger Burchill of Ultra Game Players, who felt that the Doom-styled gameplay became dated, though he did welcome the link cable-based multiplayer mode.

Descent II was a finalist for CNET Gamecenter's 1996 "Best Action Game" award, which ultimately went to Quake. The editors wrote that "Descent II offered even more insane vertigo action than the original, plus an added bonus that set the tone for computer gaming in 1996--a multiplayer mode". In 1996, Computer Gaming World declared Descent II the 123rd-best computer game ever released. It was also ranked No. 46 on PC PowerPlay's list of the 50 games of the century, due to the game's "schizophrenically devised" maps, robots' artificial intelligence, and atmosphere whose intensity the magazine considered to be previously unparalleled. Later in 2000, the same magazine ranked it No. 90 on their list of the top 100 games of all time, calling it the best of the Descent series. Descent II was named one of the top 100 CD-ROMs by PC Magazine.
