= Katherine Saltzberg =

American actress, singer, and comic (born 1962)

- Born: Katherine Maisnik; August 12, 1962 (age 63); Burbank, California, U.S.
- Occupation: Actor

Katherine Saltzberg (née Maisnik) is an American actress, singer, and comic. She is best known for starring as the showbiz-talented 16-year-old daughter of Brian Dennehy's character in the ABC sitcom, Star of the Family.

== Theater ==
In 2009, Saltzberg wrote and performed the one woman show, Los Angelyne, an autobiographical theater performance where the "personal" becomes very, very public, as she recounted how her life and home were invaded by Los Angeles icon Angelyne, the attention-hungry queen of billboard self-promotion. Los Angelyne premiered at REDCAT.

== Television ==
Saltzberg starred in the ABC sitcom, Star of the Family, playing Jennie Lee Krebs, a 16-year-old singer who begins getting show business offers because of her talents in the country/pop genre. This scares her father, played by Brian Dennehy. Saltzberg sang the opening theme song and was nominated for Best Young Actress in a new TV series.

== Hugo's Amazing Tape ==
Saltzberg and her sister, Lauri Fraser, presented their father's, Hugo Maisnik's, adhesive-free-tape on Shark Tank, and sold to Mark Cuban and Lori Greiner.

== Personal life ==
Saltzberg is the granddaughter of the British and American publicist, Jack Oliphant, who represented such individuals as Frank Sinatra, Sammy Davis Jr., Pearl Bailey, and Sophie Tucker.
