= Labtec =

American computer accessory manufacturer

Labtec Inc.
- Formerly: Labtec Enterprises Inc.; Spacetec IMC Corporation
- Type: Private (1980–1998); Public (1998–2001)
- Founded: 1982; 44 years ago
- Defunct: 2001; 25 years ago
- Fate: Acquired by Logitech
- Headquarters: Vancouver, Washington, United States
- Products: Headphones, headsets, keyboards, mice, speakers, webcams
- Website: labtec.com at the Wayback Machine (archived 2000-12-06)

Labtec Enterprises Inc. was an American manufacturer of computer accessories active as an independent company from 1980 to 2001. They were best known for their budget range of peripherals such as keyboards, mice, microphones, speakers and webcams. In the United States, the company had cornered the market for computer speakers and headphones for much of the 1990s before being acquired by Logitech in 2001.

== History ==
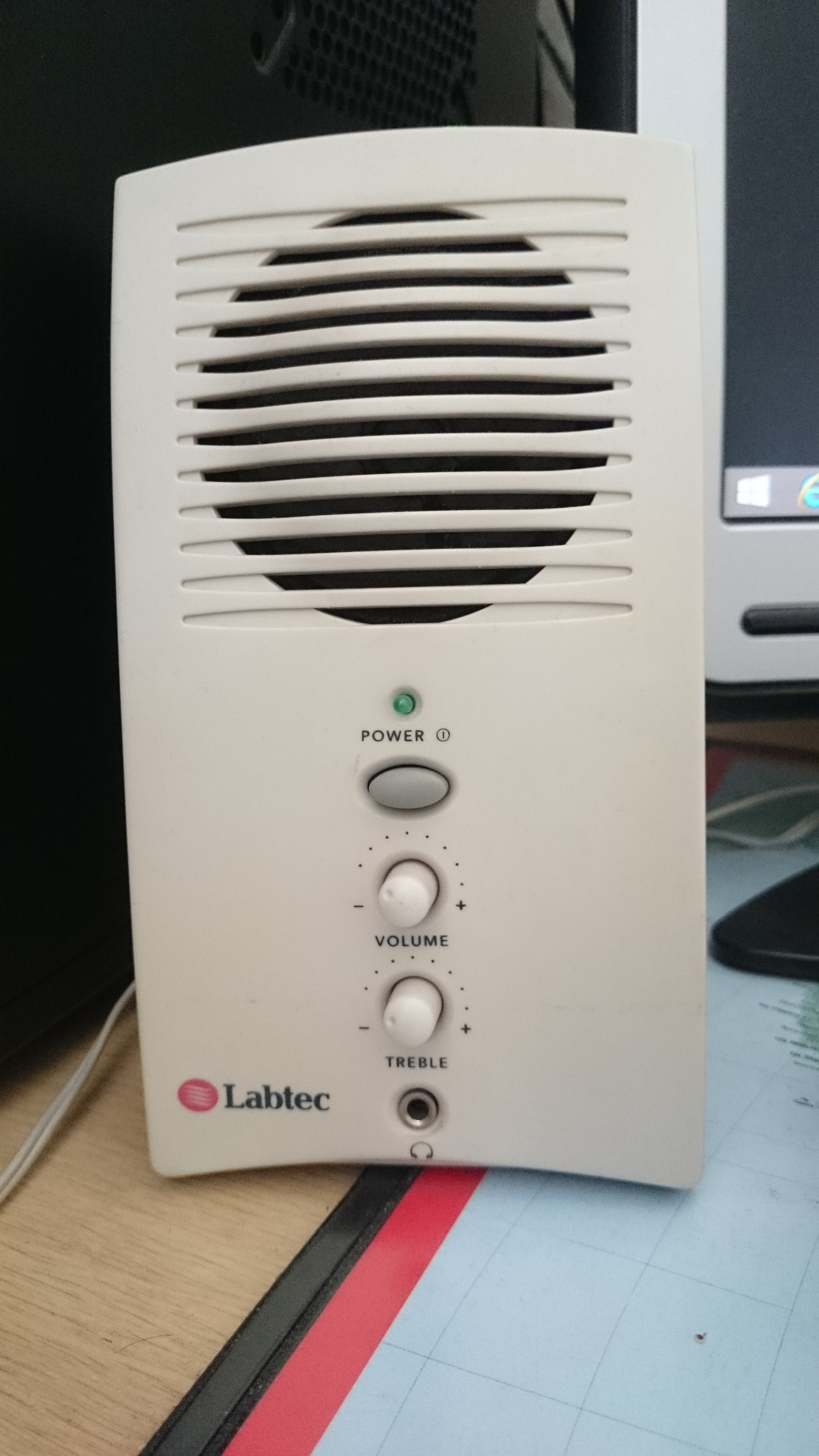
A speaker from Labtec

Labtec Enterprises Inc. was founded in 1980 by Charles Dunn and based in Vancouver, Washington, for most of its independent existence. The company was initially focused on providing audio gear (primarily headsets) for the airline industry before branching out to providing peripherals for personal computers in 1990. By the mid-1990s Labtec catered to three segments: the personal computer buyer, providing speakers and microphones; the airline industry, providing headphones and headsets; and the professional audiovisual and telephonics industry, providing audio cables, switches, and junction boxes. The company employed 20 people domestically at the company's combined headquarters and warehouse in Vancouver, Washington, in 1993. Meanwhile, the bulk of the company's products were manufactured overseas in Hong Kong and Taiwan. In 1993, the company was selling about 150,000 speakers to consumers a month.

In 1998, Labtec merged with Spacetec IMC Corporation, becoming a new publicly traded corporation in the process. The combined company changed its name to Labtec Inc. in February 1999. Spacetec IMC had manufactured 6DOF controllers for use with CAD software. A Spaceball 2003 controller was used to control the Mars Pathfinder spacecraft in 2000.

In 2001, Logitech bought Labtec for approximately US$125 million in cash, stock and debt in order to expand its line of audio products for personal computers and other devices.
