= Descent (video game) =

1995 first-person shooter game

- MS-DOS cover art
- Developer: Parallax Software
- Publishers: Interplay Productions; MacPlay (Mac OS); R-Comp Interactive (RISC OS)
- Directors: Mike Kulas; Matt Toschlog
- Producer: Rusty Buchert
- Designers: Che-Yuan Wang; Mark Dinse; Jasen Whiteside
- Programmers: John Slagel; Rob Huebner
- Artist: Adam Pletcher
- Writer: Josh White
- Platforms: MS-DOS, PC-98, Mac, PlayStation, RISC OS
- Release: MS-DOS; UK: March 3, 1995; NA: March 17, 1995; Macintosh; Late 1995; PlayStation; JP: January 26, 1996; NA: March 12, 1996; EU: March 1996; RISC OS; Late 1998
- Genres: First-person shooter, shoot 'em up
- Modes: Single-player, multiplayer

Descent is a first-person shooter (FPS) game developed by Parallax Software and released by Interplay Productions in 1995 for MS-DOS, and later for Macintosh, PlayStation, and RISC OS. It popularized a subgenre of FPS games employing six degrees of freedom and was the first FPS with entirely true-3D graphics. The player is cast as a mercenary hired to eliminate the threat of a mysterious extraterrestrial computer virus infecting off-world mining robots. In a series of mines throughout the Solar System, the protagonist pilots a spaceship and must locate and destroy the mine's power reactor and escape before being caught in the mine's self-destruction, defeating opposing robots along the way. Players can play online and compete in either deathmatches or cooperate to take on the robots.

Descent was a commercial success. Together with its sequel, it sold over 1.1 million units as of 1998 and was critically acclaimed. Commentators and reviewers compared it to Doom and praised its unrestrained range of motion and full 3D graphics. The combination of traditional first-person shooter mechanics with that of a space flight simulator was also well received. Complaints tended to focus on the frequency for the player to become disoriented and the potential to induce motion sickness. The game's success spawned expansion packs and the sequels Descent II (1996) and Descent 3 (1999).

== Gameplay ==
=== Single-player ===
Screenshot of the player engaging a robot from a cockpit perspective. The yellow number and adjacent bars in the HUD represent the amount of total energy. Also in the HUD, counterclockwise from top left: the available extra lives, an enemy missile lock indicator, a colored key inventory, the selected primary weapon, the player ship's shields, the selected secondary weapon, and the score count.

Descent is a first-person shooter and shoot 'em up game wherein the player pilots a spaceship through labyrinthine mines while fighting virus-infected robots, using the ship's armaments. They must find and blow up each mine's reactor core, triggering a countdown before the reactor meltdown that will destroy the mine and the player if they fail to reach the exit, which was supposedly inspired by the Millennium Falcon's attack on the Second Death Star in Return of the Jedi. The exit door is always open after the blowing up of the reactor and upon the mine meltdown countdown. However, for two levels, the reactor core is replaced with a boss robot. To obtain access to the reactor, the player must collect one or a combination of three colored access keys for each level. As a secondary objective, the player can also choose to rescue PTMC (Post Terran Mining Corporation) workers taken hostage by infected robots. Points are received for defeating robots, rescuing hostages, blowing up the reactor or defeating the boss robot, and escaping the mine before its self-destruction; accumulating enough points will reward the player with an extra life (see below). If the player is too late to escape the mine meltdown, the player loses a life and all accumulated powerups while any embarked hostages are killed, causing the player to begin the next level with only the laser level reset to level one and the default number of concussion missiles for the difficulty level, and therefore, the player receives no bonus scores at the end of the mine.

Items are available as collectible power-ups. They are either scattered throughout the mines or obtained by defeating robots. Weapons are split up into primary and secondary weapons. Primary weapons range from lasers to wide-range Spreadfire Cannons to the chargeable Fusion Cannons whose shots can punch through numerous enemies. They all consume energy as their ammunition, except for the Vulcan Cannon, which uses rounds of explosive shells. Secondary weapons include various missiles (both unguided and homing), such as the Smart Missile, which releases several smaller guided bomblets upon impact, as well as Proximity Bombs that are dropped behind the player's craft to slow pursuing enemies. The player's spacecraft uses shield power as health, and can carry a maximum of 200 units of shields and energy each. Energy is replenished from energy power-ups or recharged to 100 units at permanent energy centers. Shields can only be restored by collecting blue shield orbs. There are also power-ups that modify the status and weaponry of the ship; for example, Cloaking Devices temporarily render the ship invisible, while Invulnerability temporarily inhibits receiving damage, with Quad Lasers modifying the ship's laser system to fire four bolts of energy instead of the standard two. The ship is destroyed directly when its shield goes down to zero, which causes the player to lose all rescued hostages aboard, and all acquired weapons to be dropped as power-ups. The ship respawns at the start of the level at the cost of a life and the player can return to the area of the demise of their previous ship to recover these power-ups. Players can record and later view their experiences in the form of demos, both in single-player and multiplayer.

Descent features 30 levels, 27 (nine tenths or 90%) of which are regular levels and three (one tenth or 10%) of which are secret levels. Each level is based in a mine or military installation in various locations in the Solar System. The game demands that players keep their sense of orientation in a fully 3D environment with a flight model featuring six degrees of freedom in zero-gravity. It also provides a 3-dimensional wire-frame automap that displays any area of the current mine visited or seen by the player. Variously colored lines indicate locked doors and zones such as energy stations and reactor areas. These mines may contain hidden doors or robot generators that spawn enemy robots. Flares and lasers light up dark areas of the mine.

=== Difficulty modes ===
Descent is played in one of five difficulty modes: Trainee (easy), Rookie (normal), Hotshot (hard), Ace (very hard) and Insane (very very hard). As the difficulty increases, robots become smarter and fire more projectiles and more rapidly and face better evasion. With higher difficulties, the player has fewer concussion missiles at the beginning (seven in Trainee, six in Rookie, five in Hotshot, four in Ace and three in Insane). Energy and shield power-ups are worth fewer points with increasing difficulties (18 in Trainee, 15 in Rookie, 12 in Hotshot, nine in Ace and six in Insane). Meltdown countdowns become shorter with higher difficulties (50 seconds in Trainee, 45 seconds in Rookie, 40 seconds in Hotshot, 35 seconds in Ace and 30 seconds in Insane). Beginning with Hotshot, players get skill bonuses at the end of each mine.

==== Robot generators ====
Robot generators debut or first appear in Level 3. They generate robots in a number of waves depending on the difficulty level. Higher difficulties generate more robots, with the Insane difficulty generating an unlimited number of robots.

=== Multiplayer ===
Descent allows online competitive and cooperative multiplayer sessions. The competitive sector consists of "Anarchy", "Team Anarchy", and "Anarchy With Robots", three deathmatch modes whereby players attempt to destroy as many of each other's ships as possible. Team Anarchy assigns players to two opposing teams, and Anarchy With Robots adds hostile robots to the match. In Cooperative, players team up to destroy mines and compete for the highest score. Competitive modes allow a maximum of eight players, with cooperative modes allowing up to four. Players can press a single key to type a message referred to as a taunt, rather than pausing to type in the full message. They can also join same servers across different platforms, particularly MS-DOS and Macintosh.

== Plot ==
Descent is set in 2169. The story begins with a briefing between PTMC executive S. Dravis and the player's character, PTMC's best "Material Defender", who is hired on a mercenary basis to eliminate the threat of a mysterious alien computer virus infecting the machines and robots used for off-world mining operations.

The PTMC developed numerous mines in the Solar System's planets and moons for a variety of uses, including resource extraction, science research, and military installations. Prior to entering a mine, the player receives an intelligence briefing upon the robots used there, however the computer virus has resulted in some existing robots either modified considerably or even new robots being produced that PTMC is unaware about. The player starts with the mines on the Moon and later shift to Venus and to Mercury, where a boss robot has to be destroyed. Afterward, the mines progress further away from the Sun, as the player visits Mars, then the moons of Jupiter, Saturn, Uranus, Neptune, and eventually to Pluto and its moon Charon. The player accesses the three secret levels located in the asteroid belt using alternative exit doors hidden in specific levels.

After defeating the boss robot on Charon, the Material Defender is informed he cannot return to the PTMC's headquarters in Earth orbit, as there is a chance his ship may be infected with the same virus as the defeated robots. His employer also mentions that PTMC has lost contact with their deep-space installations outside the Solar System, setting the stage for the sequel.

== Development ==
Descent was co-created by programmers Mike Kulas and Matt Toschlog. It has origins as far back as 1986, when Toschlog first joined the gaming industry at Sublogic, where he also first met Kulas. There, the pair worked on various simulation titles from Flight Simulator 2 to Jet. Toschlog left the company in 1988 for Looking Glass, where he worked with Ned Lerner to develop Car and Driver. Kulas joined the company in 1990 to develop utilities for Car and Driver. The two had devised an idea of an indoor flight simulator that used shaded polygons. After working on Ultima Underworld however, they realized they could add textures to the polygons for a spectacular effect. By April 1993, they finished a two-page sketch for what would become Descent.

Our aim was to create an '80s-style arcade game with '90s technology. We wanted a full 3-D environment in which the player was surrounded by interesting structures and threats in all dimensions.

— Mike Kulas, Wired

Descent took about 21 months to finish. According to Kulas, the game cost around US$450,000 to make. The game's marketing budget was $1 million. Deciding that their idea was too good for anyone else to develop it, Kulas and Toschlog left Looking Glass in June 1993 to form Parallax Software. They hired Che-Yuan Wang and John Slagel as their programmers, with Wang also being their level designer. They also hired Adam Pletcher as their artist. They set out to contact publishers, including Scott Miller of Apogee Software, id Software's primary publisher, who was excited about their proposal and signed a contract with them. For the next seven months, Apogee invested in Parallax and shared with them experience they had gained from developing their own 3D shareware titles. Parallax would implement artistic and structural changes that Apogee requested. After those months, Apogee had numerous projects in the works, and Parallax's project became more expensive to create, so Apogee severed its involvement in the project.

Left without a publisher, Parallax spent the next three months to develop a mock-up prototype, continuing their coding. The project was originally titled Miner, but Parallax presented their prototype in written letters to 50 game companies as Inferno. Of those letters, three of them received a reply. One of them was from Interplay, who immediately signed the company up. Until the game's full release, Interplay's producer Rusty Buchert would oversee and guide the development of the project. Parallax hired three more people to finish the project: level designers Mark Dinse and Jasen Whiteside and story writer and 3D modeler Josh White.

During level design, the idea of simple connected tunnels as the sole component of level architecture expanded to also include rooms and exits. As levels became more complex and confusing, the developers added an automap to address this problem. To design the levels, Descent's graphics engine uses portal rendering, which uses collections of cubes to form rooms and tunnels. Within the game, sides of cubes can be attached to other cubes, or display up to two texture maps. Cubes can be deformed so long as they remain convex. To create effects like doors and see-through grating, walls could be placed at the connected sides of two cubes. Robots were drawn as polygonal models; sprites were only used to represent the hostages and power-ups. This system was very efficient, and made possible the first truly 3D textured environment in a video game.

Another obstacle to overcome was adding online multiplayer. Parallax found it difficult to implement and were initially reluctant to do so. At the same time during development, they had learned of Doom and the popularity of its multiplayer. Interplay sent Rob Huebner to help Parallax program multiplayer. Near their project's completion, Parallax faced yet another obstacle: they needed to make sure that their highly detailed and complex game could run smoothly on computers. Although ultimately the requirements to run the game fast were high, an added option to adjust detail complexity did help.

Release timeline
1995	Descent
1996	Descent: Levels of the World
1996	Descent II
1996	Descent II: Vertigo Series / The Infinite Abyss
1997
1998
1999	Descent 3
1999	Descent 3: Mercenary

=== Releases and ports ===
Parallax Software and Interplay followed the shareware model used by Apogee and id Software, and on December 24, 1994; uploaded a seven-level shareware demo as Descent both in retail and on the Internet.

The full game for MS-DOS was released in the United Kingdom on March 3, 1995, and in North America on March 17, 1995, followed by a Macintosh port published by MacPlay in December 1995. A modified version of Descent with stereoscopic graphics was released as a bundle with StereoGraphics's SimulEyes VR 3D glasses.

A PlayStation port was released in Japan on January 26, 1996, in the United States on March 12, 1996, and in Europe that same month, with SoftBank being the Japanese version's developer. The PlayStation version replaces the still screens and text with full-motion video pre-rendered cutscenes incorporating voice acting.

November 22, 1995 also saw the release of Descent: Levels of the World, an add-on containing over 100 winning level submissions from a design competition held by Interplay, plus one level designed by Parallax Software. Also in March 1996, Descent: Anniversary Edition was released, which bundled Descent, Levels of the World, as well as additional exclusive levels.

On October 29, 1997, Interplay published Descent I and II: The Definitive Collection, a compilation containing the full versions of Descent, the Levels of the World mission pack, Descent II, and Vertigo mission packs, and a mission editor by Brainware. Besides a choice of the original Descent II levels (subtitled Counterstrike), or the Vertigo Series levels, the first Descent levels (subtitled The First Strike) can be started in the Descent II game UI where robots adopt the Descent II sounds and improved AI. The original Descent program is included for players that prefer the unmodified The First Strike, as well as to run Levels of the World. There is also a preview for the upcoming Descent 3.

Descent was later ported to RISC OS by R-Comp Interactive in late 1998, which received a 32-bit update in 2003.

==== Cancelled ports ====
A Sega 32X version of Descent was planned as the first console version, but it was never released. A 3DO Interactive Multiplayer version was showcased at E3 1995 and slated to be published by Interplay, but never came to fruition for unknown reasons. Likewise, a Panasonic M2 version was also announced but never released due to the system's cancellation. A planned Sega Saturn version was cancelled because the programmers found that a straight port of the PlayStation version was not possible, and they did not think it would be worth their while to do a more elaborate port for the Saturn. Interplay had plans dating to mid-1996 to port Descent to Nintendo 64 under the name Ultra Descent. The port was delayed before it was eventually cancelled in 1998 in favor of Descent 3, with Parallax's Jim Boone explaining that it never reached the design phase in development. In April 2010, Interplay partnered with independent developer G1M2 to release a WiiWare version for Fall 2010. It would have featured enhanced textures and a variety of controls, including motion controls of a Wii Remote and Nunchuk with a MotionPlus accessory and possibly a Wii Balance Board. The deadline was missed, and the last time the developer publicly provided an update on its progress was in a response to a news inquiry in 2011, assuring that the project was still underway, before it was ultimately quietly abandoned.

=== Mods ===
Descent uses package files to store and load level data such as level structures, graphics, objects, and sound effects and music—similar to the WAD file format used for Doom. It also allows players to create their own such files containing the data, which can then be loaded and played. Later in 1997 on the end-of-life commercial cycle came the release of the game's source code, excluding the audio code. Parallax released the source code under the license that permits non-commercial uses only. All of this, combined with the game's popularity, has resulted in a number of distributed mods.

=== Re-releases ===
Descent was re-released on modern digital distribution services. It was one of the launch titles for the open beta version of Good Old Games on September 8, 2008, followed by a Steam release on February 13, 2014. However, the game was withdrawn from Good Old Games in December 2015 along with Descent II and Descent 3, and later from Steam. A representative of Parallax Software responded to speculation on the Good Old Games forums regarding the withdrawal of the titles. Interplay owned the Descent trademark and the publishing rights to those games, but their developers still retained the copyrights to them. The latter pulled their games off because Interplay purportedly had not paid them royalties since 2007. As a result, they had terminated the sales agreement, disallowing Interplay from further selling them.

However, in November 2017, Good Old Games announced that the Descent series would be available for sale again on their platform. The game has also since resurfaced on Steam.

== Reception ==
=== Pre-release ===
Customer reception of the shareware version of Descent was very positive, with players praising the fully 3D environment and commentators noting perceived "loyalty and goodwill" that both Parallax and Interplay fostered. However, it also garnered player complaints about a technical bug that would recharge each robot's shields whenever the player ship was destroyed (the problem was exacerbated on the last level of the shareware, where the power reactor is replaced with a boss and the gameplay thus becomes extremely difficult). It also received complaints for lacking the ability to save in-game, instead saving the player's progress between levels. Parallax recognized the bug and the popularity of the save feature, so they released patches to address the issues. Mark Burgess of PC Zone called it one of the best shoot 'em up games and wrote that it justified shareware, giving it a perfect five floppy disks out of five. Descent would later go on to become one of the games to inspire other retailers and software companies to look into and embrace the shareware model.

=== Sales ===
On Electronic Entertainment's charts in March 1995, the PC and CD-ROM editions of Descent appeared as Nos. 5 and 8 of the top-selling PC and CD-ROM titles before climbing to Nos. 4 and 3 the next month, respectively. The game first appeared on PC Zone's charts of the top-selling games in May 1995, landing on Nos. 4 and 2 on the top full price and CD-ROM titles, respectively. The shareware version appeared as No. 3 on the top budget games. In June 1995, the CD-ROM version dropped off, and the shareware version fell to No. 6 of the budget games and the full game to No. 9 of the full price games before dropping off next month. The full game rose back up in August 1995 to No. 19 of the top full price games, while the shareware version fell down to No. 7 of the top commercial titles. The game dropped off PC Zone's charts altogether the next month. The Macintosh port also landed on No. 10 of the top Macintosh games in December 1995.

Interplay estimated in March 1995 before Descent's full release that shareware copies of Descent were distributed 900,000 times via online services, on the Internet, or at retail. Official global sales of the game, together with its sequel, surpassed 1.1 million copies as of June 1998, while VentureBeat estimated in 2015 that the actual sales figure of the original was as high as 25 million copies.

=== Computer versions ===
Reception

Review scores
Publication	Score
Computer Gaming World	4/5
Edge	8/10
GameSpot	8/10
Next Generation	4/5
PC Gamer (US)	96%
PC Zone	94%
MacUser	4.5/5
Macworld	4/5
PC Magazine	4/4
PC Player	90%

The computer versions of Descent received near-universal acclaim, with reviewers widely comparing it to Doom and noting its unique use of free motion, as well as a fully three-dimensional environment. The multiplayer aspect received equal acclaim. Michael Ryan of PC Magazine enthusiastically attributed the attention the game received to its unique gameplay and found no similar alternatives. GameSpot remarked that "only one 3-D shooter adds a whole new dimension to the field: Descent.", particularly noting the labyrinthine environments. Charlie Brooker of PC Zone noted the game's intense environment and similarities to Doom and praised its multiplayer and ability to taunt opposing players, with only minor criticism directed toward its slight repetitiveness. Common complaints tended to focus on Descent's ability to disorient players, as well as potentially induce motion sickness.

Next Generation particularly praised the graphics and animation, intelligent enemies, and wide array of power-ups, all of which it said would "keep most gamers glued to the screen for hours". They were however disappointed by the game's delayed release, asserting it led to the game being overshadowed by id Software's then-newly released Heretic. Nevertheless, they rated it the fourth-best virtual reality game in September 1995 due to its 3D environment and graphics. In its third-highest-rated review, PC Player also praised the intelligent enemies, as well as the lighting effects, the use of various graphical textures, and "genuine" 3D graphics. Edge remarked the ability to record demos that capture the player's experiences, but also criticized the slightly repetitive gameplay and noted the robots' basic algorithm of being only a little more than "fire and evade", despite their intelligence.

The Macintosh port of Descent also received praise. Bob LeVitus of MacUser called it "one of the best Mac games ever released", attributing its popularity to its online multiplayer mode. His only criticism was the high system requirements (the port required a Power Macintosh to play) and a difficult learning curve. Macworld's Fred DeLisio also praised the enemy artificial intelligence, realism and sense of immersion, and multiplayer for allowing cross-platform sessions between MS-DOS and Macintosh users and allowing players to join and quit anytime without ending the sessions for everyone else, but also criticized the high system requirements.

Jeremy Parish of USgamer ran a retrospective feature on the game, saying Descent combined the genre of space flight simulator with a first-person shooter experience. He also attributed the game's popularity and modifiability to the continued development of fan mods. Engadget's David Lumb retrospectively likened the game's graphical innovations to the computer-generated imagery used in the 1995 film Toy Story. GamesTM rated it No. 4 on their retrospective "Top Five FPS" list for its truly 3D environment combined with the six degrees of freedom, and Rock, Paper, Shotgun ranked it No. 13 on its list of "The best space games on PC", citing the game's numerous innovations, speed, labyrinthine level structures, and the free range of motion.

==== Accolades ====
Year	Work	Category	Result
1995	PC Gamer	Best Action Game	Won
1995	PC Gamer	Best Multi-Player Game	Won
1995	PC Gamer	Special Achievement in Innovative Design	Won
1995	PC Magazine	Technical Excellence Award	Won
1995	PC Games	Game of the Month	Won
1995	PC Computing	Most Valuable Entertainment CD-ROM	Runner-up

=== PlayStation version ===
Reception

Review scores
Publication	Score
Electronic Gaming Monthly	7.375/10
GameFan	83%
Next Generation	4/5
Maximum	4/5

The PlayStation port of Descent also received praise, which was often directed to the port's use of impressive lighting effects. Like its computer versions, criticism commonly centered on the player's disorientation. The four reviewers of Electronic Gaming Monthly called it an outstanding conversion due to its extremely fast rendering speed and improved lighting effects. However, two of them felt that the gameplay lacked excitement. Major Mike of GamePro also judged it "an excellent conversion" due to its complex but generally easy to master controls, though he did complain of occasional severe slowdown. Maximum stated it "is one of the greatest games to grace the PlayStation, and rates alongside WipeOut as one of the best ambassadors for the machine." They particularly applauded the labyrinthine level design and intelligent enemy AI. Their subsequent feature on the game was more critical, saying that "the official PAL version of Descent features some of the most hideous letterbox PAL borders we've ever seen, with no sign of PAL optimization whatsoever." However, it also praised the game's use of the PlayStation Link Cable.

Next Generation too praised the developers for adding a new industrial soundtrack to the PlayStation version rather than doing a direct port. Like Major Mike, they found the controls complex but easy to master. While criticizing that the game can be dry and repetitive, they concluded that "Overall, you still can't go wrong, and if you've got the ability to fly against someone else, it doesn't get much better." K. Lee of GameFan praised the sound and music and noted the game's difficulty due to the ubiquitous doors on walls, ceilings, and floors. He thought the automap was useful, though still found it too easy to become disoriented.

== Legacy ==
Descent is credited with starting a subgenre of six-degrees-of-freedom first-person shooters, and remains an icon of the subgenre. It holds a Guinness World Record for being the first fully 3D first-person shooter, and its popularity spawned two sequels: Descent II in 1996 and Descent 3 in 1999. It also led to a 1999 trilogy of Peter Telep novels based on the series, comprising Descent, Descent: Stealing Thunder, and Descent: Equinox. It brought about a handful of similar "Descent clones", most notably Forsaken, which was released by Acclaim Entertainment in 1998 and had similar graphics and almost identical gameplay to Descent.

In 1997, Interplay released Descent to Undermountain, a role-playing video game that used a modified version of the Descent graphics engine.

Since Descent 3, there had been plans and considerations to work on another game in the series. Those were either cancelled or abandoned in favor of other projects. Volition, the developer of the FreeSpace series, began work on Descent 4. Again, development was cancelled, as most of the company was interested in developing a fantasy role-playing game instead. It would have been a prequel to Descent, and reportedly served as the basis for the 2001 first-person shooter Red Faction. Similarities would have included plot points such as an evil faceless corporation and the mysterious "Plague" they are attempting to harness. President of Volition Mike Kulas stated in an interview that the Red Faction and Descent universes are strictly separate, but also that the technology intended for Descent 4 had been used in Red Faction.

A series revival was planned in the late 2010s when development of another Descent title was confirmed. On Kickstarter in March 2015, Descendent Studios announced a prequel to the original game, partnering with Interplay and using their intellectual property rights to develop it. Titled simply Descent, it would have been the first game since Descent 3 to be released in the series. However, after a settlement in 2022, the game was renamed to Ships That Fight Underground, dropping the Descent title altogether. Another game, Overload, was announced on Kickstarter by Revival Productions and successfully crowdfunded in 2016. It included many of the former employees of Parallax Software, including co-founders Mike Kulas and Matt Toschlog. It is a six-degrees-of-freedom tunnel shooter and a spiritual successor to the Descent games that released in 2018.
