= Tera Patrick =

American pornographic film actress (born 1976)

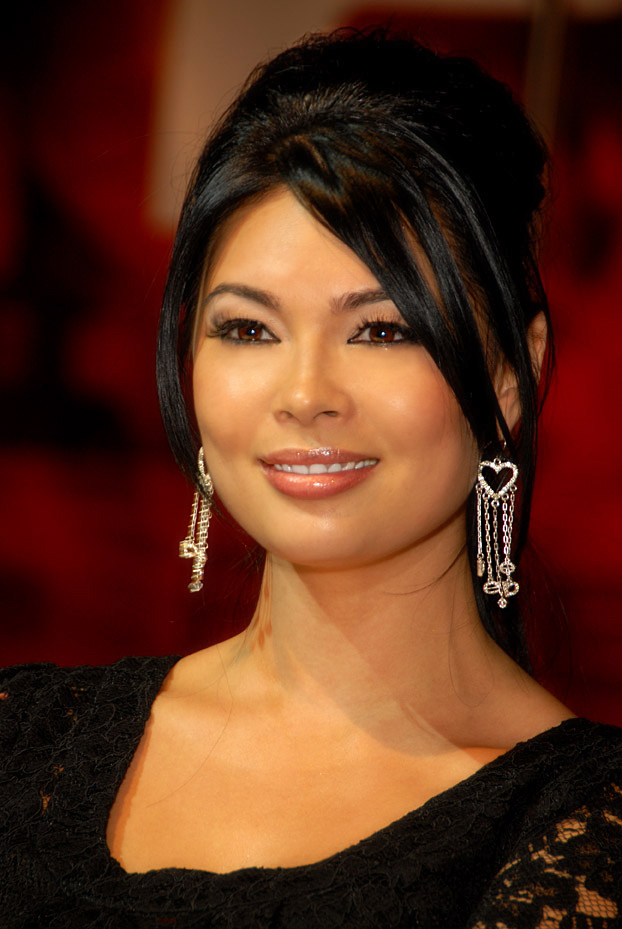
- Patrick in 2010
- Born: Linda Ann Hopkins; July 25, 1976 (age 50); Great Falls, Montana, U.S.
- Occupation: Pornographic film actress
- Years active: 1999–present
- Spouse: Evan Seinfeld (m. 2004; div. 2009)
- Partner: Tony Acosta (2010–2015)
- Children: 1
- Website: terapatrick.com

Tera Patrick (born Linda Ann Hopkins, July 25, 1976) is an American former pornographic film actress who was the Penthouse Pet of the Month for February 2000 and is an inductee of the NightMoves, AVN and XRCO Hall of Fame. She is a recipient of the Hot d'Or Award, NightMoves Award, AVN Award, XRCO Award, Venus Award, Adultcon Award, Adam Film World Guide Award, Eroticline Award, FOXE Award, FAME Award, Fanny Award, XBIZ Award, XFANZ Award, and ASACP Service Recognition Award.

== Early life ==
Patrick was born Linda Ann Hopkins (Note: Patrick says she legally changed her name to "Tera Patrick" in 2009.) on July 25, 1976 in Great Falls, Montana, and raised near San Francisco, California. When she was ten, her parents separated and she grew up with her father David Hopkins, a carefree hippie. Her mother is Thai and her father is of English, Irish and Dutch descent. She took weekend classes at the Barbizon Modeling and Acting School for two years. She has stated that she was sexually assaulted at one of her first photo shoots by the photographer. She said he "was feeding [her] champagne and Valium" until she "was getting wasted". Later, she spent two years in Tokyo, where "she became addicted to Valium and alcohol and spent her paychecks on shopping sprees". When her father learned she had become sexually active, he complained to her agency, pointing out she was underage. She was sent back to the United States, in her words, "sixteen years old and already a washed-up model". At age 18, she obtained a GED, briefly studied nursing at Boise State University, then received EMT certification from a local vocational school.

== Career ==
Patrick has appeared in Playboy and Penthouse, where she was the "Pet of the Month" for February 2000 and was selected as "Pet of the Year" runner-up. In 2003, Patrick became the masthead publisher of Genesis.

In November 2006, Patrick starred in a Vivid/Teravision production titled "Tera Patrick's Fashion Underground" where she performed with Jean Val Jean and Tommy Gunn. In the same film her husband, under the name Spyder Jonez, performed with Lanny Barby. In an interview, Tera Patrick says she's OK with him doing scenes with other girls.

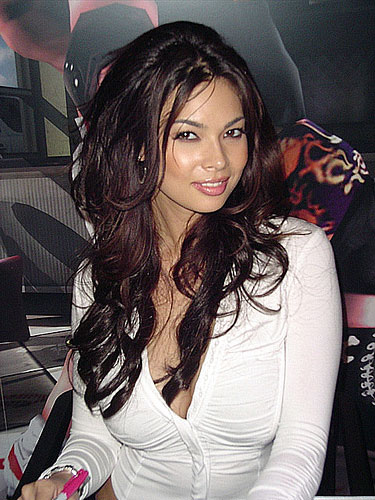
Patrick promoting her character in the video game Backyard Wrestling 2 in 2004

In 2008, Patrick began hosting the Playboy TV erotic instructional show, School of Sex. She was also the host for 25th AVN Awards ceremony.

Patrick retired from shooting scenes in the adult industry in 2008 but continues to operate her website, production company, and pursue other business ventures. She licenses her movie catalog worldwide.

In January 2013, Patrick hosted the annual XBIZ Awards.

=== Appearances ===
- Patrick appeared and voiced herself in episode 63 of Aqua Teen Hunger Force animated series, which first aired November 19, 2006.
- Her television appearances include Chelsea Lately, Last Call with Carson Daly, The Big Idea with Donny Deutsch, MSNBC, Fox News, and Telemundo.
- Patrick was on the cover of the July 2006 American edition of FHM.
- Patrick was made into a playable character in the video game Backyard Wrestling 2.
- Patrick was also in the music video for "I Can't Move" by Everlast.
- Patrick had a cameo role in the 2007 Will Ferrell comedy Blades of Glory.
- She appeared with her then-husband, Evan Seinfeld (a.k.a. Spyder Jonez), on the E! Channel's True Hollywood Story Rock Star Wives.
- Patrick hosted the 2007 Spike channel Guys Choice awards.
- In 2008, Patrick appeared as herself in four episodes of the WE network's reality series Secret Lives of Women.
- Patrick was involved in promotion for the 2008 video game Saints Row 2, and also gave her own voice in its first episodic expansion pack Ultor Exposed.
- In 2011, Complex magazine ranked her at #2 in their list of "The Top 50 Hottest Asian Porn Stars of All Time."
- In 2012, Patrick appeared in the tenth episode of season one of Showtime series Girls of Sunset Place.
- In 2014, Patrick appeared in two mainstream movie productions. In the Dave Foley and Andy Dick comedy Live Nude Girls, she was cast along with fellow adult industry performers Bree Olsen and Asa Akira. Patrick also appears in the horror movie Angel of Darkness: The Legend of Lilith
- In August 2014, Patrick announced hosting an hour-long weekly radio show on Vivid radio on the Sirius/XM network.
- In May 2018, she appeared in Time magazine as a model in artist Nika Nesgoda's 2002 photographic series, Virgin, portraying the Virgin Mary along with Stormy Daniels and other adult film actresses.

=== Overseas career ===
Tera Patrick starred in an Indonesian mainstream horror film Rintihan Kuntilanak Perawan (Moaning of Virgin Ghost), which was presented countrywide from October 14, 2010, through November 16, 2010.

=== Book ===
Patrick's memoir, Sinner Takes All, co-written by journalist and author Carrie Borzillo, was published by Penguin imprint Gotham Books in 2009.

== Personal life ==
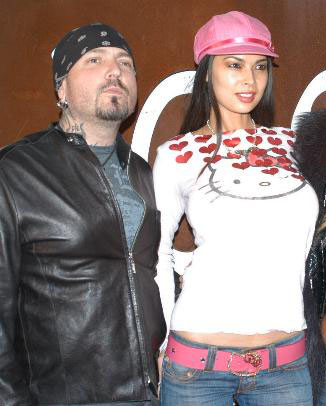
Patrick with then-husband Evan Seinfeld in 2006

After a three-year relationship, Patrick married musician and fellow porn actor Evan Seinfeld in a small ceremony in Las Vegas on January 9, 2004, where they were attending the 2004 AVN Awards show. On September 30, 2009, the couple announced that they were ending their marriage.

Patrick gave birth to a girl on February 25, 2012. The father is Hollywood special effects artist Tony Acosta, known for his work on 300, Dawn of the Dead and Man of Steel.

In an interview with Holly Randall on September 6, 2018, Patrick stated that she moved to Italy with her daughter, where she married an Italian defense attorney. She first visited the country in 2015 after getting an offer to do feature dance shows.

== Awards and honors ==
- 2000 Penthouse February Pet of the Month
- 2000 Hot d'Or Award – Best American New Starlet
- 2000 NightMoves Award – Best New Starlet (Editor's Choice)
- 2001 AVN Award – Best New Starlet
- 2001 XRCO Award – Best New Starlet
- 2001 NightMoves Award – Best Actress/Female Performer (Fan's Choice)
- 2001 Hot d'Or Award – American Best Actress
- 2001 FOXE Award – Vixen of the Year
- 2002 AVN Award – Best Tease Performance
- 2002 Venus Award – Best Actress (USA)
- 2002, 2004, 2005 FOXE Award – Female Fan Favourite
- 2006 FOXE "X" Award
- 2007 FAME Award – Favourite Female Starlet
- 2007 Adam Film World Guide Award – Crossover Female Performer Of The Year
- 2007 Eroticline Award – Successful Performing Businesswoman of the Year (USA)
- 2007 NightMoves Hall of Fame
- 2007 Adultcon Top 20 Adult Actresses
- 2008 FAME Award – Favourite Female Starlet
- 2009 AVN Hall of Fame
- 2009 FAME Award – Favourite Female Starlet
- 2009 FAME Award – Favourite Star Website
- 2009 XBIZ Award – Crossover Star of the Year
- 2009 XBIZ Award – ASACP Service Recognition Award
- 2010 XFANZ Award – Superstar Honors
- 2013 Fanny Award – Lifetime Achievement Award
- 2014 XRCO Hall of Fame
