= Under the Gun Theater =

Theater in Chicago, Illinois

- Under the Gun Theater
- Interactive map of Under the Gun Theater
- Address: 956 W. Newport Avenue; Chicago, Illinois; United States
- Coordinates: 41.9446°N 87.6540°W
- Owner: Angie McMahon (executive director)
- Current use: Stand-up comedy Improvisational comedy Sketch comedy Comedic plays

Construction
- Opened: 2014

Website
- www.underthegun.theater

Under the Gun Theater is a theater company located in Chicago, Illinois. Founded by Angie McMahon and Kevin Mullaney, Under the Gun is a sketch and improvisational comedy theater which opened in Chicago's Lake View community in 2014. The theater was known for its interactive show Comedy Against Humanity, which ended due to legal concerns, based on the game Cards Against Humanity. In September 2017 Under the Gun Theater announced it would partner with the Chicago stand-up comedy institution Lincoln Lodge to focus on producing stand-up comedy shows.

== History ==
Under the Gun Theater had its origins in 2013. Kevin Mullaney, former artistic director at the Upright Citizens Brigade Theatre in New York, and Angie McMahon, founding director of Chemically Imbalanced Comedy and a faculty member of The Second City, developed a partnership through a series Skype experiments they used to help set goals. As their friendship progressed, they decided to form a theater company. Initiating as an itinerant company, they created shows and produced them at various Chicago venues such as the Apollo Theater and The Second City.

Eventually McMahon and Mullaney settled on a building to create their own space. In an interview with DNAinfo Chicago, Mullaney shared that the goal of their theater was to create a comedy theater and not just an improv theater. He stated, "We're also going to do sketch and plays and musicals, storytelling, whatever we can think of. The common thread is comedy."

Mullaney left the company in May 2015.

Chicago Reader critic, Justin Hayford, commented: "Under the Gun's 27-show schedule is no big deal (Annoyance and iO top that handily, but then, they've got multiple stages). What's beginning to set this relatively new company apart is its crafty populism. These comics have a knack for identifying common yet resonant cultural experiences—family reunions, horror movies, drinking games, porn—ripe for improvisation." Cusp Magazine noted "[the theater] hosts an ensemble of actors with expressive, out of the ordinary ideas, bringing a unique improv style to Chicago called 'party prov.' "

In February 2016, Under the Gun Theater was named one of the best comedy theaters in Chicago by Time Out Chicago. Time Out ranked it in its top ten list amongst other notable Chicago theaters like The Second City, Annoyance Theater, and Laugh Factory.

The current location of the theater is on the second floor of Links Hall located in Wrigleyville.

== Ensemble ==
Under the Gun is an ensemble theater. Typically an ensemble-based company is formed by a group of artists (actors, directors, designers, playwrights, etc.) who work collaboratively to create each production. The theater holds annual auditions to discover new ensemble members. The directors and ensemble members had created several original written shows at the theater's inception: The Last Mall Santa, Halloween Hell House, and The Zombie Diaries.

When asked about the differences amongst theaters in Chicago and Under the Gun's ensemble, the theater's artistic director explained: "I think what makes us different is our ensemble. Our idea of the ensemble is we are going to bring in a large group of people that we like, and we try to empower them to do the best work they can do. And we give them plenty of chances to fail with the only consequence of failing being that the show closes and they get to try another show... That's a very different mindset than other theaters. I have to have the mindset of if a person is struggling in the show, is there anyway I can help them perform better? Because I am stuck with them. Unless I can trick them into punching me in the face, I can't cut them."

== Past productions ==
Comedy Against Humanity, which was an improvisational show inspired by the party game Cards Against Humanity, was one of Under the Gun Theater's more successful shows. According to Drew Wancket of the Chicago Stage Standard, he considered it, "enormously funny, and the audience ate it up." Wancket went on to write, "With iO moving south, Under The Gun is positioning itself to be the new force for comedy on the North Side." The show, however, eventually closed due to fear of litigation from Cards Against Humanity. In response to the closing of their show, the theater created a different interactive show inspired by the drinking game Never Have I Ever.

In April 2015, the Under the Gun Theater created Swarm of Spoilers, a parody show based on George R.R. Martin's Game of Thrones series. The comedic play recaps the previous four seasons of television show and premiered the Friday before HBO aired the first episode of its fifth season. Kevin Mullaney, who directed Swarm of Spoilers, stated: "I'm somebody who's very sensitive about spoilers, so I wanted to make sure it was very clear from the title." The final production included 45 of the series' characters, and was played by an 18-person ensemble.

The theater developed a Saturday night series called Porn Minus Porn, where the ensemble would lampoon the writing of pornographic films by cold reading transcribed scripts. A Newcity Stage critic wrote: "I admit that going into this show at Under The Gun Theater, I was less than optimistic about the possibilities of pornography without sex... the Under The Gun Ensemble has been following "Life on Top", an actual adult script, skipping over the sex to focus on the 'rich character and plot development in porn', as host Ben Bowman dryly puts it. The ensemble on stage capitalizes perfectly on the idiotic structures, non-sequiturs and gross clichés that infest porn like bedbugs infest New York City".

== See also ==
- Theater in Chicago
