= Exxxotica Expo =

Adult entertainment industry convention

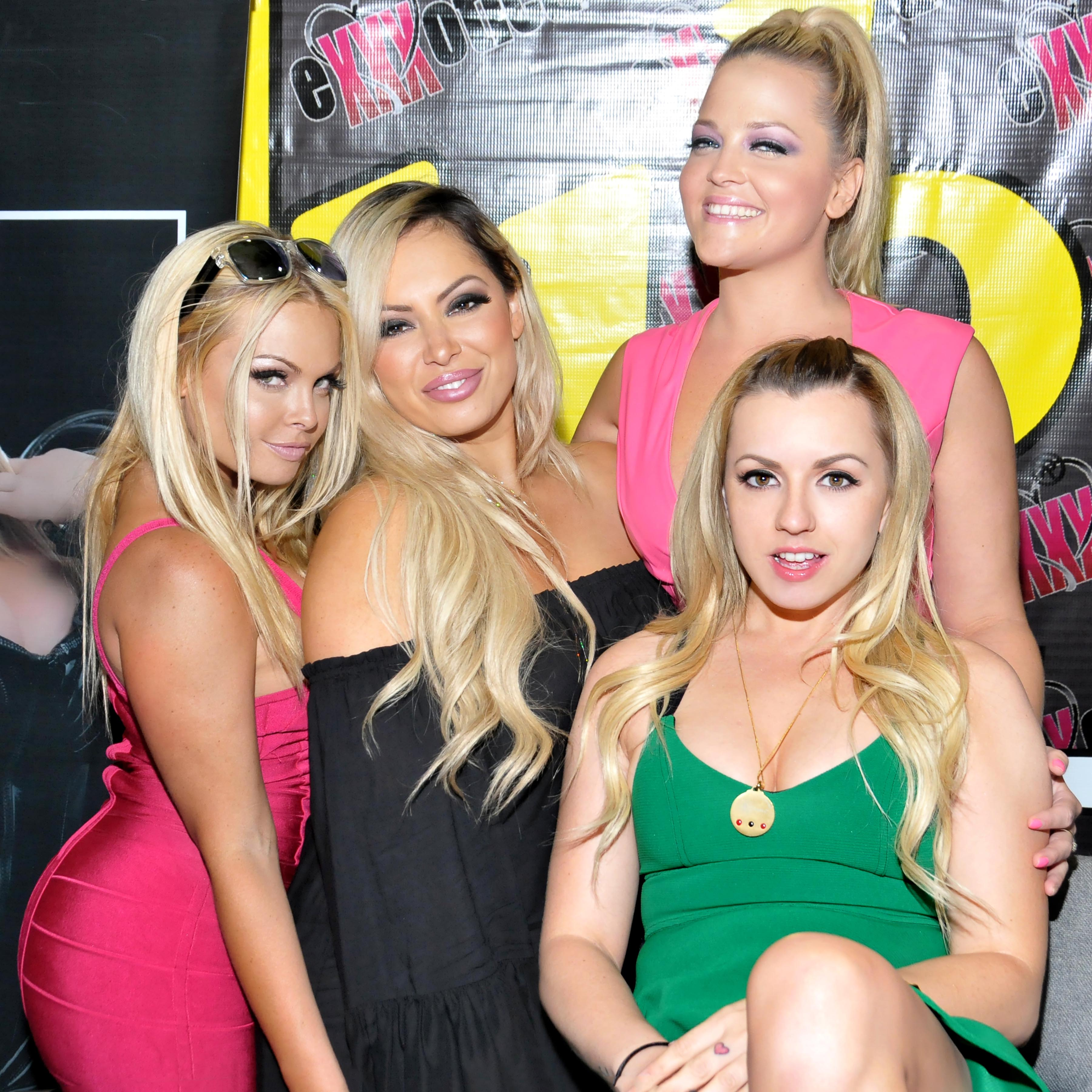
- Performers Jesse Jane, Jenn Marie, Alexis Texas and Lexi Belle at 2015 Exxxotica Dallas
- Status: Active
- Genre: Adult entertainment, erotica, pornography
- Venue: Donald E. Stephens Convention Center, Portland Expo Center, Miami Airport Convention Center, New Jersey Convention and Exposition Center
- Locations: Edison, NJ; Chicago; Washington; Miami (current); Former locations: Los Angeles (2010–2011); Dallas (2015); Columbus, Ohio (2016); Aurora, Colorado (2017–2018); Portland, Oregon (2019)
- Country: USA
- Inaugurated: May 2006; 20 years ago
- Organizer: 3XEvents
- Website: exxxoticaexpo.com

Exxxotica Expo is an American annual three-day adult-themed event produced by 3XEvents. First held in 2006, Exxxotica has featured some of the most recognized names in the adult industry, including Jenna Jameson, Tera Patrick and Katie Morgan.

== Miami Beach/Fort Lauderdale ==
The Exxxotica Expo had its first show in May 2006 at the Miami Beach Convention Center. The Exxxotica Expo would continue to be held each year at this venue through 2012. After the 2012 show, the event organizers announced that the expo would be moving to Fort Lauderdale in 2013. The event would go on to be held in Fort Lauderdale in 2013 and 2014, but did not return in 2015, thus ending a nine-year streak of Exxxotica shows in Florida. Exxxotica returned to Florida in July 2018, with a show at the Miami Airport Convention Center.

== New Jersey ==
In 2008, the event was expanded to the New York/New Jersey market. The 2008 and 2009 shows were billed as "Exxxotica NY", although both shows actually took place in New Jersey. The 2008 event was originally scheduled to be held in Secaucus, New Jersey. Days before the event, Secaucus officials filed a suit to stop the event from taking place, alleging that the convention would violate state law prohibiting liquor license owners from presenting pornographic material. Exxxotica convention organizers voluntarily moved the convention to the New Jersey Convention and Exposition Center in Edison, New Jersey. The Edison show would go on to attract over 18,000 attendees that year, and this event continues to be held yearly at the Edison venue. In September 2010, a lawsuit against a former Secaucus mayor surfaced due to the cancelling/moving of the convention to a different area. In addition to the yearly show in Edison, Exxxotica held its first show in Atlantic City at the Trump Taj Mahal Casino & Resort in April 2013. Another show would be held at the same venue in Atlantic City in 2014, but Exxxotica would not return to Atlantic City in 2015. In November 2017, Exxxotica celebrated their tenth anniversary in Edison, N.J., with a record attendance of about 30,000 attendees over the three days of the expo.

=== The Fannys ===
The inaugural Exxxotica Fan Choice Awards, also called "The Fannys", was held on April 20, 2013, in the Grand Ballroom of the Trump Taj Mahal and was hosted by pornographic actress Alexis Texas and comedians Jim Florentine and Don Jamieson. The award nominees and winners is both selected by the fans through voting. In February 2013, the show's "BBW Performer of the Year" category was renamed from "Hungry Hungry Hottie" to "Whole Lotta Love" after the category's at first title was deemed offensive by the genre's fans and performers. The second annual Fanny Awards show was held on April 12, 2014, at the Trump Taj Mahal's Xanadu Theatre and was hosted by pornographic actresses Allie Haze and Tori Black and comedian Bonnie McFarlane.

Fanny Award Winners

	2013	2014	2025
Best Branding	Cam4.com	Arrangement Finders	—
Best New Product	Vape World	XXX Vaporizers	—
Clout Queen (Influencer of the Year)	—	—	Phoenix Marie
Cocksman of the Year (Male Performer of the Year)	James Deen	Manuel Ferrara	Jason Luv
Cyber Hustla (Webcam Girl of the Year)	Taylor Stevens	Chroniclove	Taylor Love
Digitial Deviant (Content Creator of the Year)	—	—	Dare Taylor
Director of the Year (Best Director)	Stormy Daniels	Axel Braun	—
Lifetime Achievement Award	Ron Jeremy & Tera Patrick	Evan Stone & Nina Hartley	Alexis Texas, RubberDoll, & Lisa Ann
Most Heroic Ass (Best Anal)	Kelly Divine	Alexis Texas	Rebel Rhyder
Most Valuable Vagina (Female Performer of the Year)	Gianna Michaels	Lexi Belle	Violet Myers
Movie of the Year	Lisa Ann Can't Say No – Wicked Pictures	T&A – Rock Star/Adam & Eve	—
New Girl on the Block (Female Newcomer of the Year)	Karmen Karma	Belle Knox	Hailey Rose
Non-White Chick of the Year (Ethnic Performer of the Year)	Veronica Rodriguez		Miss B. Nasty
Studio of the Year	Vivid Entertainment	Adam & Eve	—
Super Freak (Kink Performer of the Year)	—	Bonnie Rotten	Vampiress
T.S., I Love U (Transsexual Performer of the Year)	Ts Madison	Eva Lin	Emma Rose
The Who? (Most Underrated Star)	Johnny Castle	Ash Hollywood	Katie Kush
Thirsty Girl (Best Oral)	Sara Jay	Riley Steele	Vicki Chase
Webcam Company of the Year	—	Chaturbate	
Webcam Site of the Year	Chaturbate.com	—	—
Website of the Year	HotMovies	—	—
Who's Your Mommy? (MILF Performer of the Year)	Lisa Ann	Tanya Tate	Cory Chase
Whola Lotta Love (BBW Performer of the Year)	Kelly Shibari		Venus Rising
"—" denotes the award was not presented that year

== Los Angeles ==
For 13 years until 2009, the biggest adult show in Los Angeles was Erotica LA, with attendances of up to 30,000. The Exxxotica Expo held its first show in Los Angeles at the Los Angeles Convention Center on July 9–11, 2010, bringing in about 15,000 attendees. The decision to hold a show in Los Angeles came in part because Erotica LA, a similar consumer adult entertainment event, decided not to hold a show in 2010. The Exxxotica LA shows drew in the lowest attendance of the three locations.

The Exxxotica Expo took place again at the Los Angeles Convention Center on August 26–28, 2011. 2011 was the final year that Exxxotica held a show in Los Angeles.

== Chicago ==
The Exxxotica Expo held its first show in the Chicago area in July 2011, taking place in July at the Donald E. Stephens Convention Center in Rosemont, Illinois. The show attracted the record 26,500 attendees, eclipsing the previous record of 24,000 set in 2008 in Miami Beach.

== Columbus, Ohio ==
The Exxxotica Expo held a show in Columbus, Ohio at the Greater Columbus Convention Center in August 2016.

== Dallas ==
The Exxxotica Expo held its first show in Dallas at the Kay Bailey Hutchison Convention Center in August 2015. The event drew more than 15,000 attendees, and organizers planned to hold another show at the same venue the following year. However, in February 2016, the Dallas City Council voted 8–7 to ban the event from the venue. The organizers filed for a temporary injunction, which was rejected by US District Judge Sidney A. Fitzwater. The legal battle between the city of Dallas and Exxxotica would continue for several years, ending in 2019 when the Dallas City Council signed off on paying Exxxotica's founder $650,000 to settle the suit.

== Aurora, Colorado ==
Exxxotica took place in Aurora, Colorado in 2017 at the Crowne Plaza Airport Convention Center. The show returned to the center in April 2018.

== Portland ==
The first show in Portland, Oregon was June 7–9, 2019, at the Portland Expo Center.
