= Life on Top =

2009 American TV series

- Based on: Life on Top by Clara Darling
- Starring: Heather Vandeven
- Country of origin: United States
- Original language: English
- No. of seasons: 2
- No. of episodes: 26

Production
- Running time: 30 minutes
- Production companies: Lott Productions; HBO Entertainment

Original release
- Network: Cinemax
- Release: October 3, 2009 – April 1, 2011

Life on Top is an American softcore drama television series based on the novel of the same name by Clara Darling. It aired on Cinemax from October 3, 2009, to April 1, 2011, with 26 episodes focusing on young corporate professionals with four women as the de facto main characters.

Although it is heavily implied to be Manhattan, principal photography occurred in Bucharest, Romania, over five weeks, with the help of production company Castel Film Romania. A map of Romania can be seen in season 1, episode 2 and the vast majority of the supporting cast shown in the end credits is Romanian.

In 2015, Life on Top was featured in Under the Gun Theater's performance of Porn Minus Porn, a comedy show where actors parody softcore porn by cold reading scripts.

== Cast and characters ==
- Heather Vandeven as Bella Marie: A successful erotic model for "life on top" and Sophie's older sister.
- Mary LeGault as Sophie Beale: A college graduate who has moved to New York City and is living with her older sister Bella. Sophie is a financial analyst for an online poker player.
- Krista Ayne as Maya: Moved to New York City following her best friend and college roommate Sophie. Maya later develops an interest in kickboxing and begins training for fights.
- Mia Presley as Cassia: The sous chef at Les Delices Restaurant, and Bella's best friend. She hopes to start her own restaurant one day.

== Appearances of notable adult entertainment performers ==
- Riley Steele
- Lexi Belle
- Heather Vandeven
- Krista Ayne
- Justine Joli
- Jayden Cole
- Erika Jordan
- Melissa Jacobs
- Mary LeGault
- Nikky Thorn/Thorne
- Valentina Vaughn
- Ryan Keely
- Brandin Rackley

== Episode list ==
=== Season 1 (2009) ===
| No. overall | No. in season | Title | Directed by | Written by | Original release date |
|---|---|---|---|---|---|
| 1 | 1 | "Sister Act" | Coco Ginsberg | Charles Kline | October 3, 2009 |
| 2 | 2 | "Working Girls" | Kenny Golde | Jess Roman | October 10, 2009 |
| 3 | 3 | "Shoegasm" | James Michaels | Zoey Savage | October 17, 2009 |
| 4 | 4 | "Ménage a Top" | Coco Ginsberg | Charles Kline | October 24, 2009 |
| 5 | 5 | "Tied Up, But Not Tied Down" | Kenny Golde | Zoey Savage | October 30, 2009 |
| 6 | 6 | "Girls Night Out" | Coco Ginsberg | Jess Roman | November 7, 2009 |
| 7 | 7 | "Down for the Count" | Kenny Golde | Charles Kline | November 14, 2009 |
| 8 | 8 | "First Date" | James Michaels | Jess Roman | November 21, 2009 |
| 9 | 9 | "Blame It on Brazil" | Coco Ginsberg | Zoey Savage | November 28, 2009 |
| 10 | 10 | "Birthday Suit" | Kenny Golde | Charles Kline | December 5, 2009 |
| 11 | 11 | "Growing Pains" | James Michaels | Zoey Savage | December 12, 2009 |
| 12 | 12 | "All In" | Kenny Golde | Jess Roman | December 19, 2009 |
| 13 | 13 | "Happy Endings" | Coco Ginsberg | Charles Kline | December 26, 2009 |

=== Season 2 (2011) ===
| No. overall | No. in season | Title | Directed by | Written by | Original release date |
|---|---|---|---|---|---|
| 14 | 1 | "Ready to Rock" | Jared West | Charles Kline | January 7, 2011 |
| 15 | 2 | "Inner Animal" | Jared West | Jess Roman | January 14, 2011 |
| 16 | 3 | "Vajazzled" | Jared West | Zoey Savage | January 21, 2011 |
| 17 | 4 | "Sextacular" | Jared West | Charles Kline | January 28, 2011 |
| 18 | 5 | "Ladies Night" | Jared West | Zoey Savage | February 4, 2011 |
| 19 | 6 | "Wedding Sex" | Jared West | Jess Roman | February 12, 2011 |
| 20 | 7 | "Farmer and the Bella" | Jared West | Charles Kline | February 18, 2011 |
| 21 | 8 | "The Phucket List" | Jared West | Zoey Savage | February 26, 2011 |
| 22 | 9 | "The Ex-Files" | Jared West | Jess Roman | March 5, 2011 |
| 23 | 10 | "Blackout" | Jared West | Charles Kline | March 12, 2011 |
| 24 | 11 | "Bad Luck Chuck" | Jared West | Zoey Savage | March 19, 2011 |
| 25 | 12 | "The Angelina Effect" | Jared West | Jess Roman | March 25, 2011 |
| 26 | 13 | "Exhibitionist" | Jared West | Charles Kline | April 1, 2011 |
