= Saints Row 2 =

2008 action-adventure game

- Developer: Volition (Note: The Windows port was developed by CD Projekt Localisation Centre and brought to Linux by Virtual Programming.)
- Publisher: THQ (Note: The Linux port was published by Deep Silver.)
- Director: Clint Ourso
- Producer: Greg Donovan
- Designers: Scott Philips; James Tsai
- Programmers: Nicholas Lee; Jeff Thompson
- Artist: Frank Marquart
- Writers: Steve Jaros; Drew Holmes
- Series: Saints Row
- Platforms: Microsoft Windows; PlayStation 3 Xbox 360; Linux
- Release: PlayStation 3, Xbox 360: NA: October 14, 2008; AU: October 16, 2008; EU: October 17, 2008; Windows: NA: January 5, 2009; EU: January 23, 2009; AU: February 5, 2009; Linux: WW: April 14, 2016
- Genre: Action-adventure
- Modes: Single-player, multiplayer

Saints Row 2 is a 2008 action-adventure game developed by Volition and published by THQ. It is the sequel to 2006's Saints Row and the second installment in the Saints Row series. The game was released in October 2008 for the PlayStation 3 and Xbox 360, January 2009 for Microsoft Windows, and April 2016 for Linux. A mobile tie-in game was developed by G5 Entertainment and also released in October 2008. Saints Row 2 directly follows from the events of the first game, as the player's custom character awakens from a coma after five years to find that their gang, the 3rd Street Saints, has been disbanded, and their former territories have been seized by three new criminal syndicates and a corrupt corporation. With the help of new and old allies, the player attempts to rebuild the Saints and take back Stilwater from their rivals.

Story missions are unlocked by trading in "Respect" points, currency earned by completing minigames and side-missions. Outside of the main story, players can freely roam Stilwater, which has been expanded with new locations and consists of two main islands. The game is played from a third-person perspective and its world is navigated on-foot or by vehicle. Players can fight enemies using a variety of firearms, and call in non-playable gang members to assist them. An online multiplayer mode allows two players to explore Stilwater together while completing missions and activities, or multiple players to engage in a variety of cooperative and competitive game modes.

Saints Row 2's developers opted for a more comedic tone to set the game apart from the Grand Theft Auto series, with which the original game was compared by most reviewers for their similar premise and gameplay elements. The game's promotional effort included various public showings, special editions and downloadable content including the Ultor Exposed and Corporate Warfare mission packages. Reviews were largely favorable, praising the action and straightforward gameplay, while criticizing technical issues and a lack of innovation. The Windows port in particular was heavily criticized for technical issues not present in any of the other versions. The game had sold around 400,000 units by November 2008, and 3.4 million units by September 2010. A sequel, Saints Row: The Third, was released in November 2011.

== Gameplay ==
Saints Row 2 is an action-adventure video game set in an open world environment, offering the player a large open environment in which to move around. The player's character is capable of maneuvering through the environment, utilizing weaponry and engaging in melee combat warfare. After successfully completing the first game mission, the player meets the Third Street Saints and begin their devious schemes with the gang. Missions are unlocked by earning 'Respect' points from minigames and side-missions and although completing missions is necessary for game progression, players can complete them at their own leisure. The player is granted the option of instantly retrying the missions should they fail an attempt. Numerous checkpoints save progress in each mission, and missions can be replayed from locations within the environment. Aside from attempting missions, the player can explore the environment, purchase items at shops and participate in the aforementioned mini-games and side-missions. The player can also wreak havoc on the city of Stilwater, incurring violent reprisals from the authorities. The player can recruit members from a friendly gang and use a mobile phone to contact friends and/or businesses, as well as to input cheat codes. Entering cheats will disable Xbox 360 achievements.

Players drive vehicles that are stolen, bought or unlocked. Aside from automobiles, players can use boats and water craft, helicopters, fixed-wing aircraft, and motorcycles. A cruise control system can be activated while using land or sea vehicles. Waypoints can be placed on the pause-screen map, leaving a GPS route between the player character's location and the set destination. Players can hail taxicab services and pay a fee to quickly navigate the city. By taking land vehicles to Mechanics, players can apply paint schemes, body mods, hydraulics and nitrous oxide.

Players create their own character through a system that allows them to modify gender, ethnicity, fitness, voice, face and hairstyle. Walk and fighting styles, and personality traits can be assigned. Players purchase clothes, tattoos and piercings, and set outfits can be bought or created and saved to the player character's wardrobe. "Cribs" (safe houses) allow players to withdraw earnings, change outfits, replay missions and save the game. Cribs can be customized by applying themes and purchasing objects like TVs and pool tables. Boats and fixed-wing aircraft can be stored at purchased docks and hangars. Players select the outfits, vehicles, gestures and graffiti styles used by street members of the Third Street Saints.

The combat systems from Saints Row have been updated but many of the basics remain unchanged. While engaging in melee-based combat, the player character will perform combos and charge up attacks, and can execute a finishing move if three consecutive hits are dealt. With a gun equipped, the player can perform a groin attack, and can zoom in for a finer aim reticle. The player can also employ the use of human shields, and can use makeshift weapons pulled from the environment e.g. fire hydrants, cement blocks. Should the player either commit illegal activities or incite rival gang members, they will provoke potentially fatal attention from authoritative figures or rival gangs. The notoriety bar is a visual representation of the proactivity of the opposing figures' response and continual inciting of these groups will bring about a more powerful response, such as SWAT teams from the police. The player will continue to be chased by these groups until captured or killed and must reduce the notoriety bar by either hiding from the police or gang and wait for it to "cool off", or by seeking out a drive-through confessional which will clear the notoriety bar for a small fee. Should the player character be apprehended or killed, a small percentage of the player's earnings will be removed and the player will respawn at law or healthcare institutions. The game contains over forty different weapons, many of which have been recycled from Saints Row. The game allows the player to utilise new weapon types, examples of which include satchel charges, laser-guided rocket launchers, chainsaws and more. The player has the ability to dual wield handguns and submachine guns. Weaponry can be purchased by the player from specific stores or unlocked throughout in-game progress.

=== Open world ===
Players navigate the open world, fictional city of Stilwater. The city consists of forty-five neighborhoods divided between twenty districts. It is expanded from Saints Row's version of Stilwater, roughly one-and-a-half times as big and featuring new districts such as the prison, nuclear power plant, and expanded airport among others. Game developers stated that the city has very much been redeveloped and each individual neighborhood has been touched up in one way or another. According to the storyline, the in-game corporation Ultor spent more than 300 million dollars redeveloping the city, funding the police force and, as it states, turning the "once crime-ridden third-tier city" into an "urban utopia". The Saint's Row district is a more notable change within the city, having been completely redesigned and serving as the location of Ultor's headquarters; a towering skyscraper referred to as the Phillips Building. Many old districts from the earlier revision of Stilwater have also seen changes. Examples include the expansion taken place on the Suburbs district, which is double the size of its depiction in Saints Row and the Museum district, which features the Eramenos Ancient Greek museum exhibit, complete with models of the Acropolis of Athens and Theatre of Dionysus. There are also several completely new districts, such as the Marina and the University.

From the beginning of the game, the map of Stilwater is fully visible. However, shops and activities will simply be displayed as a question mark until the player discovers them. By completing missions and wiping out enemy strongholds the player gains control of the various neighborhoods the city is split into. There are over 130 interiors within the city, and hidden events can be triggered by some, including over ninety shops which can be purchased when the player controls each shops' associated territory. The player gets a 10% discount at owned stores and buying an entire chain of departments will mean that the protagonist's face appears on in-game billboard advertisements. The game shares technology with that of Red Faction: Guerrilla, another Volition-developed game and so certain elements of the environment are fully destructible. A number of Easter eggs are placed within the sandbox, including the pop-out Easter Bunny which won "Top Easter Egg of 2008".

=== Respect system ===
The Respect system is a scoring system where the player earns Respect points to unlock missions and progress through the storyline. The player can partake in storyline and stronghold missions only after filling up at least one bar of Respect, and Respect points are removed when the player starts a mission. The 'style rank' is a modifier of how much Respect the player can earn; this is increased by purchasing items for the player character. Respect points can be earned in two ways; by progressing through side-missions called Activities and by completing mini-games and stunts called Diversions.

There are a broad range of Activities and Diversions available for the player to progress through. Many of the game's Activities made appearance in Saints Row and a variety of new Activities have also been introduced in the game. Examples include an underground fight club, a parody of the Cops television show known as FUZZ and numerous others. Each Activity can be initiated from various locations and plays out over six levels of increasing difficulty. The Activities have been designed to suit solo and co-operative play. Most Diversions do not have specific start points. There are numerous Diversions playable in the game, such as acts of indecent exposure, combat and driving stunts, car surfing and a survival horror minigame called Zombie Uprising.

=== Multiplayer ===
Saints Row 2 has various multiplayer components implemented throughout the game. Through an online network or through System Linking, the player can progress through the game with a cooperative partner. While in co-op mode, both players can explore the city and progress through the game's storyline missions and minigames. Both players are rewarded and credited for completion of such activities, and the players can furthermore play against each other in competitive metagames. The co-op mode is "drop-in/drop-out" and there is no limit as to how far the players can be away from each other.

The game contains competitive multiplayer modes, supporting between four and twelve players in a match. There are two standard deathmatch modes; the free-for-all "Gangsta Brawl" mode and its team-based variant, "Team Gangsta Brawl". Another mode, known as "Strong Arm", puts two teams against each other fighting for control over the neighborhood. In "Strong Arm", the first team to earn $100,000,000 wins and money is earned by competing head-to-head in activities, controlling "tag spots" which serve as bonus modifiers or by eliminating members of the opposing team. While in a party, players are free to roam around a lobby. The player can rank up in multiplayer and displays this by earning various "badges" which are displayed next to the player's name. By ranking up, the player can unlock more expensive clothing for their multiplayer character.

The multiplayer mode on PC and PlayStation 3 was discontinued in May 2014 when GameSpy's servers were shut down. However, the PC version's multiplayer can still be played via LAN tunneling software such as Evolve or Tunngle and the PS3 version's multiplayer can still be played using XLink Kai. The Xbox 360 versions of the game were unaffected as they use the Xbox network for matchmaking.

== Plot ==
Five years after the explosion on Richard Hughes' yacht, the player character (Charles Shaughnessy, Kenn Michael, Alex Mendoza, Katie Semine, G. K. Bowes, or Rebecca Sanabria), who was the sole survivor, awakens from a coma within the infirmary of Stilwater's maximum security prison after undergoing extensive plastic surgery. They escape to Stilwater with the help of Carlos Mendoza (Joe Camareno), the brother of a former 3rd Street Saints member. Carlos explains that the Saints have disbanded, with most members being arrested by Troy Bradshaw (Michael Rapaport), an undercover cop who had infiltrated the gang as a lieutenant and has since become chief of police, using his influence to protect the imprisoned Saints. In their absence, three new gangs have taken over the city: the Brotherhood, a metalhead gang who conduct gun-running operations; the Sons of Samedi, a Haitian Vodou gang who produce and sell drugs; and the Ronin, a Japanese bosozoku gang focusing on gambling and porn. Furthermore, the Saints' former base of operations, the Saint's Row district, has been redeveloped into a pristine commercial and residential area by the Ultor Corporation, which has further plans for Stilwater.

The player works to rebuild the Saints, rescuing former lieutenant Johnny Gat (Daniel Dae Kim) from his trial. The pair then recruit new members, including Carlos and Gat's acquaintances, Pierce Washington (Arif S. Kinchen) and Shaundi (Eliza Dushku), and set up a new headquarters in a hotel destroyed by an earthquake. The player steps up as the Saints' new leader, adopting the moniker of "The Boss", and declares war on the rival gangs, assigning their lieutenants – Gat, Carlos, Pierce and Shaundi – to discover more about each.

Carlos researches the Brotherhood, led by Maero (Michael Dorn). After the Boss rejects Maero's deal to join forces and split their profits (80% to the Brotherhood and 20% to the Saints), a series of rebound retaliations result in the deaths of Carlos, who is dragged by a speeding truck and mercy killed by the Boss, and Maero's girlfriend Jessica (Jaime Pressly), whom the Boss locks in her car to be inadvertently crushed by Maero with his monster truck. After assaulting the Brotherhood's headquarters and forcing Maero to flee, the Boss kills him during a demolition derby to end the Brotherhood.

Shaundi investigates the Sons of Samedi, led by "The General" (Greg Eagles) and his right-hand man, Mr. Sunshine (Phil LaMarr). After the Saints disrupt the Samedi's operations and steal most of their customers, Samedi lieutenant and one of Shaundi's exes, DJ Veteran Child (Neil Patrick Harris), is forced by the gang to kidnap Shaundi. The Boss kills Veteran Child to rescue Shaundi and continues their attacks against the Samedi, destroying their drug factories and killing Mr. Sunshine. After hacking into the city's camera system to track down the General's armored limousine, which doubles as his headquarters, the Saints set up an ambush and kill the General, ending the Sons of Samedi.

Pierce and Gat focus on the Ronin, led by Shogo Akuji (Yuri Lowenthal) and his second-in-command, Jyunichi (Brian Tee), on behalf of Shogo's father, Kazuo, who leads international operations. After the Saints rob their casino, the Ronin retaliate by infiltrating the home of Gat's girlfriend Aisha (Sy Smith), killing her and severely wounding Gat. After protecting Gat from an assassination attempt while hospitalized, the Boss finds and kills Jyunichi, who was betrayed by Shogo out of envy for Jyunichi's closer bond with Kazuo. Once Gat recovers, he and the Boss eliminate the Ronin's remaining members, burying Shogo alive when he disrupts Aisha's funeral, and eventually killing Kazuo himself.

After defeating the rival gangs, the Saints find themselves targeted by Ultor's power-hungry CEO, Dane Vogel (Jay Mohr), who was playing the gangs against each other to lower real estate prices throughout Stilwater and allow Ultor to purchase and redevelop the land. After fending off several attacks by Ultor's private security forces, the Saints retaliate by destroying one of the company's labs and killing its board of directors. Taking advantage of the situation to assume full control of Ultor, Vogel decides to personally deal with the Saints, but is ambushed by the Boss at a press conference. The Boss fights their way to Vogel's office and kills him, allowing the Saints to rule over Stilwater undisputed.

At any point during the game, the Boss can listen to wiretap conversations at the police station, which reveal that former Saints leader Julius Little (Keith David) had disbanded the gang at Troy's request and planted the bomb on Hughes' yacht to kill the player, knowing they would oppose his decision. Upon discovering the truth, the Boss calls former Saints lieutenant Dexter "Dex" Jackson, who left the gang to work for Ultor, and arranges a meeting at the Saints' old church to discuss their findings. Once there, however, the Boss is met by Julius instead, and the pair are attacked by Ultor security forces sent by Dex. After escaping the ambush, the Boss shoots Julius, who defends his actions and accuses the Boss of straying away from the Saints' ideals. Unmoved, the Boss finishes Julius off.

== Development ==
Volition began work on Saints Row 2 in 2005, about a year before Saints Row was released. The sequel was first announced by THQ's CEO Brian Farrell in a February 2007 conference call, alongside another six franchise continuations for the 2008 fiscal year. Game details began to surface in May 2008 after the first teaser trailer was released and sites like IGN and GameSpot reported on an early version of the game.

One of the development team's core goals was to develop an identity for the Saints Row franchise within the open world genre. The series was known as a "Grand Theft Auto clone" based on its first release's similarities to the open world sandbox game Grand Theft Auto III. Accordingly, Saints Row 2 was compared to the Grand Theft Auto series' own upcoming sequel, Grand Theft Auto IV. When questioned about the two sequels' close release dates, lead producer Greg Donovan responded that they thought their game could compete, that he saw the Grand Theft Auto sequel moving "in a more realistic direction", and that there was "room for more than just one game" in the open world genre as "a very different experience than what ... other games are looking to do". The team took an "over-the-top" design approach, with cartoonish pastiche and "wild and outrageous" gameplay. Many early game elements were considered too crass to be included in the final release.

Many of the original Saints Row developers continued onto the sequel's team. Thus, the team worked from their lessons learned rather than starting anew. The two games were consequently similar in design. They overhauled the game engine to enhance the sequel's graphics, and added contrast and higher-quality textures to make the city setting of Stilwater more realistic. Visual enhancements were also applied to people, cars, explosions, lighting, shadows, and the weather system. A central design goal was to "create a world that exists independent of the player" that featured more realistic non-player characters (NPCs) that would smoke cigarettes, use cellphones, drink coffee, open umbrellas when it rained, and physically interact. The original game's engine could not support proximity NPC interaction like sitting together or cuddling. As the city design finalized late in development, the team laboriously hand-placed 20,000 nodes throughout the game world that trigger NPC actions.

The Saints Row series narrative was conceived as a three-part story, with Saints Row 2 as the second of the three. While the developers continued the story of the original game, they sought to accommodate newcomers to the series. The final script had roughly 80,000 lines of dialogue, twice that of Saints Row's. The story drew strong cinematic influence from Quentin Tarantino films Pulp Fiction and Kill Bill. While the script was written to follow "a path of betrayal, revenge and redemption", the game retains Saints Row's light humor, with the "over-the-top, socially distorted" narrative juxtaposed with dark, gritty moments. Saints Row's silent protagonist speaks in Saints Row 2, granting the protagonist more personality and improving the storytelling, according to James Tsai, one of the lead designers. They sought to heavily stylize the game's characters and assign them unique personality traits. The basic character designs followed naturally from the story Volition wanted to tell, but the characters' personalities and mannerisms were mainly a product of the voice acting performances, where the actors had freedom to interpret and develop their characters. The game's voice actors include film and television stars such as Neil Patrick Harris, Michael Dorn, Mila Kunis, Jay Mohr, Keith David, and Eliza Dushku.

While the first game was released as an Xbox 360 exclusive, Volition expanded the sequel's initial development to the PlayStation 3 platform. The platform was successful in Europe, where Volition wished to expand. The port was developed in-house by a team that previously worked on Xbox 360 development. They struggled with the PlayStation 3's Cell architecture. The game was particularly unstable during development, and would crash after several hours of play. Lead producer Greg Donovan blamed their "failing to take systems and features to completion" as programmers fought last-minute bugs, artists lacked time to finalize designs, and consequently, playtest versions were not ready until late in the development cycle.

=== Soundtrack and audio ===
The game's soundtrack features about 170 licensed tracks accessible across twelve in-game radio stations while driving or at home. Station genres include pop, rock, hip-hop, R&B, funk, soul, alternative, indie, metal, easy listening, world, classical, reggae, and electronic with artists such as As I Lay Dying, Opeth, Duran Duran, Lamb of God, The Used, My Chemical Romance, Avenged Sevenfold, Paramore, Panic! at the Disco and Run-D.M.C. The player can create a custom playlist of the licensed tracks to play on a separate station. Lead audio designer Frank Petreikis's budget for licensed music was double that of the previous game so as to secure more prominent tracks.

Volition extended the game's over-the-top atmosphere and humor into the radio stations via commercials. For example, commercials that promoted Ultor Corporation products served to enhance the player's sense of the corporation's omnipresence in Stilwater. The radio commercials were recorded with voice actors in the same room, rather than apart, so as to maximize their group dynamism. Many of the in-game commercials went through several drafts and the developers found this writing process to be challenging.

== Marketing ==
Prior to its release, Saints Row 2 was heavily marketed and promoted through Internet and television trailers. Volition also ran several fan contests with series-related paraphernalia as prizes. The game's original release date was delayed for marketing considerations. The game's first trailer, in March 2008, was presented as a tourism promotion about the Ultor Corporation's role in rebuilding Stilwater. A full marketing campaign featuring American film actor Gary Busey began the next month. The Street Lessons with Uncle Gary video series demonstrated particular aspects of gameplay. Subsequent trailers over the next several months also highlighted gameplay elements, but one made light of Grand Theft Auto IV's lack of replay value, and another demonstrated the cooperative mode using characters modeled on the candidates from the 2008 United States presidential election. A redesigned official website and community network was launched in July 2008, and American pornographic actress Tera Patrick was featured in her own marketing campaign for the game.

Promotional contests throughout mid-2008 included "Pimp Your Crib" and "Summer of Bling". Another competition from THQ and WorthPlaying gave the winner a trip to a San Francisco Saints Row 2 multiplayer event and published their thoughts online. British fashion label Joystick Junkies ran a T-shirt design competition in September 2008, and the top entry was featured in the game's first downloadable content pack. Another round of "Summer of Bling" awarded the shirts as prizes. The "Trick Your Pack" tool launched in September let the player create their own game box art. There were also other promotions and give-aways. At conventions, Saints Row 2 appeared at the 2008 E3, THQ Gamer's Day, San Diego Comic-Con, PAX, GameStop Expo, and Leipzig Games Conventions. The game also promoted itself in the Myspace Music Tour and November 2008, an Australian fundraiser for men's health. In November, THQ signed a deal with Massive Incorporated to include in-game advertisements on their Xbox 360 and PlayStation 3 products. In-game and online, players can also find movie posters throughout the city that promote upcoming releases.

The game had a marketing budget of $9 million.

== Release ==
The game was originally scheduled for release in North America on August 26, 2008, but was delayed to October 14 both to add final touches and to launch in a more advantageous release window. The game released in three different "Collectors Editions", each with a copy of the game, a poster, a limited edition art book, and several extras. The Saints Row 2 "Initiation Pack", exclusive to Australia and New Zealand, included promotional items such as a pizza box and bullet-shaped USB memory stick. The Russia-exclusive "Gift - Buka Edition" also included the bullet-shaped USB stick, and the "Gun Pack" included a gun-shaped USB stick. A month before the game's release, Saints Row 2 producer Dan Sutton stated in an interview that they "definitely" planned to make downloadable content.

=== PC releases ===
In June 2008, THQ confirmed that a Microsoft Windows port of the game was in development. It was developed by the localization team at CD Projekt, the CD Projekt Localisation Centre. The studio later became known as Porting House, and has been referred to by Volition as "CD Projekt Black" (in parallel to CD Projekt Red). The port was released in North America on January 5, 2009, in Europe on January 23, and in Australia on February 5. In April 2016, Volition released a Linux port of the Windows version.

In the aftermath of the auctioning of THQ's assets following its bankruptcy in 2013, the source code for the PC port of Saints Row 2 was believed to be lost. In the interim, the game has become highly unplayable, with no multiplayer support following the shutdown of the GameSpy service. In October 2019, Volition announced it had found the source code and that it would begin work to rebuild the game for modern systems, including replacing GameSpy with Steam matchmaking support, along with allowing for user mods. Additionally, when the update would be released, it would contain the two DLCs, Ultor Exposed and Corporate Warfare which had not been previously released for personal computers. The community manager that had led the effort, Mike Watson (also known as IdolNinja), died from cancer on August 5, 2021, but he was aware his condition had been deteriorating in the prior year and ensured that the work was moved to a small team with Volition's and Deep Silver's support to continue on without his lead. Following the closure of Volition, as of 2026, the update remains unreleased.

=== Downloadable content ===
Saints Row 2 received several downloadable content (DLC) releases, including two episodic expansion packs: Ultor Exposed and Corporate Warfare.

Ultor Exposed adds character customization and vehicle options, including Red Faction: Guerrilla-themed content. The Saints attempt to destroy Ultor and they get help from an Ultor worker, Tera, to expose Ultor's darker side. It also adds multiplayer content, including four online multiplayer maps and a cooperative mode metagame wherein players compete for a cash bonus during story missions by accumulating points from special kill bonuses and property damage. The pack's missions feature American pornographic actress Tera Patrick, who plays a whistleblower and former microbiologist for the Ultor Corporation. Originally slated for release on April 16, 2009, the pack was delayed a week to April 23 so it could be released alongside the demo for Volition-developed game Red Faction: Guerrilla. It was released on April 23, 2009. IGN praised the game's new co-op metagame but criticized its relatively short missions. Eurogamer gave a negative review and criticized its value proposition.

Corporate Warfare focuses on the struggle between the 3rd Street Saints and the Ultor Corporation. The pack adds character costume, facial hair, and vehicle options. It also includes three multiplayer maps and another cooperative mode metagame wherein players compete in ranking by performing vehicle stunts. Corporate Warfare was released via digital download on May 28, 2009.

== Reception ==
Saints Row 2 reviews

Aggregate scores
| Aggregator | Score |
|---|---|
| GameRankings | (PS3) 83% (44 reviews) (X360) 83% (66 reviews) (PC) 71% (11 reviews) |
| Metacritic | PC: 72/100; PS3: 82/100; X360: 81/100 |

Review scores
| Publication | Score |
|---|---|
| 1Up.com | B |
| Edge | 5/10 |
| Eurogamer | 9/10 |
| Game Informer | 8.75/10 |
| GameSpot | 8/10 |
| GameSpy | 4.5/5 |
| IGN | (US) 8.2/10 (AU) 8/10 (UK) 7.5/10 |
| Official Xbox Magazine (US) | 9/10 |

The PlayStation 3 and Xbox 360 releases of the game received "generally favorable" reviews, according to video game review score aggregator website Metacritic, and the Windows release received "mixed or average" reviews.

Yahtzee Croshaw of The Escapist's Zero Punctuation named Saints Row 2 his 2008 game of the year. It was a runner-up for GameShark's overall and Xbox 360 games of the year. Game Developer named Volition in their top 50 developers of the year for their work on the game, and THQ in their top 20 publishers.

The console version of Saints Row 2 garnered generally positive reviews. The PC version was relatively less well received due to frame rate issues and visual pop-in. 1UP.com gave the game a B, stating that it "relishes the hedonistic aspects of the open-world genre", that it has "plenty of innovation" and that the "excellence in the presentation makes the world of Saints [Row] 2 a great introduction for newcomers to open world games".

Eurogamer gave the game a 9/10, stating that it "is one of the most ridiculous and enjoyable games of the year". Game Informer gave the game an 8.75/10, stating that "in its own silly, b-movie way, it's a damn fun game" and a "profanely good time". GameSpot gave the game an 8.0/10, stating that "from beginning to end, this is one of the most fun urban chaos games out there" and that it will "keep you happily creating havoc for a long time". GameSpy gave the game four and a half stars out of five, stating that it "offers up a shooting and driving experience that is plenty of fun" and that it is "self-consciously funny in its irreverence" and "will definitely appeal to much of its audience".

IGN U.S. gave the game an 8.2/10, stating that "the core gameplay experience is extremely enjoyable". IGN AU gave the game an 8/10, stating that it is "big, dumb fun". IGN UK gave the game a 7.5/10, stating that it "demonstrates that there is still plenty of mileage to be eked out of open-world games" and that "there's certainly enough here to keep any fans of sandbox violence entertained".

Among positive acclaim, some publishers gave the game generally negative reviews. UK magazine Edge gave the game a 5/10, stating that "few of the game's details will stick in your mind for long, and its pranky focus means it rarely gives you anything interesting to do with the toys on offer".

Entertainment Weekly flagged the game as "racist, misogynistic, crude, cynical, humorless and stupid" and labelled it the worst game of 2008, despite previously giving the game a B and calling it "a larcenous good time".

The game did not gain a favourable response from New York City officials and police. City spokespersons requested that the game be pulled from shelves upon its release; NYPD union boss Patrick Lynch criticized the game, stating that "these horrible and violent video games desensitize young people to violence while encouraging depravity, immorality while glorifying criminal behavior".

Jack Thompson, a former lawyer and longtime critic of violent video games, called Saints Row 2 a "Grand Theft Auto ripoff", and said that "as is true with pornography, as is true with violence, the subsequent products tend to push the envelope even more". On Tuesday, October 14, 2008, the game's US release date, candidate Leslie Crocker Snyder and others spoke out against the game, surrounded by police union members who support her bid.

Governor David Paterson signed a bill in July 2008 requiring prominent display of age ratings on video games and mandating parental control on game consoles by 2010.

In 2021, PC Gamer listed Saints Row 2 as one of the worst PC ports.

=== Sales ===
Saints Row 2 sold approximately 365,000 copies in its first month, outselling Dead Space, which was released the same day. The Xbox 360 version comprised the majority of these sales. The game shipped over two million units by the end of 2008. Still, analyst Doug Creutz reported that the game's sales to this point were well below expectations. Following Saints Row 2's January 2009 Windows release, the game had shipped over 2.6 million copies by the next month. In May 2009, THQ reported a $431 million loss in revenue, but Saints Row 2 sales totaled 2.8 million. Combined with the original release, the series had worldwide sales in excess of six million, making it one of the best-selling video game franchises.

As of September 2010, Saints Row 2 has sold over 3.4 million units worldwide. The game's success led THQ to shift its focus to large franchises.
