= Manswers =

- Genre: Documentary; Comedy
- Country of origin: United States
- Original language: English
- No. of seasons: 4
- No. of episodes: 39 (list of episodes)

Production
- Executive producers: Adam Cohen; Cara Tapper; Joanna Vernetti; Akifumi Takuma; Michael Schelp
- Running time: approx. 20 minutes
- Production companies: Fujisankei Communications International; Super Delicious

Original release
- Network: Spike
- Release: September 19, 2007 – February 3, 2011

Manswers (spelt onscreen as MANswers: Faster & Harder in season three, and MANswers: Shock & Awe in season four) is an American late night comedy series that aired on Spike from September 19, 2007 to February 3, 2011.

The series is produced by reality television production company, SuperDelicious, and aired on Spike. The executive producers are Adam Cohen, Cara Tapper, Joanna Vernetti, Akifumi Takuma, and Michael Schelp. It garnered an average of 1.1 million viewers during its first year among a specific target audience.

The first season consisted of 9 half-hour episodes. The second season showed 13 episodes of similar material.

MANswers, a portmanteau of man + answers, is a satire aimed at predominantly male audiences, primarily aged 18–40. Questions of a comical nature are asked and answered which usually relate to women and dating tips, sex-related questions and trivia, defense mechanisms in harmful situations, and firearms. Specialists with Masters and PhD degrees are brought in and give information.

== Overview ==
MANswers has a magazine style format which discusses hypothetical questions believed to be the type men discuss. It has a narrator who talks about the topics, usually over a reenactment, with footage of women dancing, beer being poured, or nun-chucks. The narrator shouts MANSWERS and an explosion happens.

== Cast ==
- Bobbi Billard (Hot Teacher / Lingerie Model / Poker Girl in Opening Credits) (31 episodes, 2007–2010)
- Matt Short (Narrator / Voice) (29 episodes, 2007–2010)
- Elizabeth Deo (Various Roles) (20 episodes, 2009-2011)
- Ward Roberts (20 episodes, 2008–2010)
- Heidi Shepherd (Various roles) (20 episodes, 2008–2010)
- Eric Martic (Nightclub patron) (19 episodes, 2007–2008)
- Destiny Monique (Model) (13 episodes, 2008–2010)
- Luke Barnett (Stoner Joe) (3 episodes, 2007)
- Miki Black (Cop / Various Characters) (7 episodes, 2007)
- Nadia Dawn (Lisa Loveland) (13 episodes, 2007)
- Bobby DiPasquale (Boyfriend) (1 episode, 2007)
- Kimberly Evan (Swedish Woman) (1 episode, 2007)
- Garrett Forbes (Hero Guy #2) (1 episode, 2007)
- Stacey Hayes (Nagging Girl / Massage Therapist / Watermelon's / Beach Babe / Hot Blonde Girl / Pretty Woman / Hottie on Treadmill) (7 episodes, 2007-2008)
- Jacqueline Hickel (Girlfriend) (1 episode, 2007)
- Britten Kelley (Hot Beach Bunny) (1 episode, 2007)
- Lamont King (Himself) (1 episode, 2007)
- Lance Kramer (Poker King & Beer Chugger) (3 episodes, 2007)
- Jay Laisne (Organ Doctor / South African) (1 episode, 2007)
- Eric Martic (Nightclub Patron) (19 episodes, 2007-2008)
- Mike Nielsen (Kung Fu Nerd) (9 episodes, 2007)
- Carl Peterson (Car Highjacker / Patient) (2 episodes, 2007)
- Rob Polonsky (Himself) (3 episodes, 2007)
- Flood Reed (Organ Donor / Redneck / Carjacker) (3 episodes, 2007)
- Bobby Rice (Couch Friend) (1 episode, 2007)
- Zander Schaus (Kidney Donor / Date Guy / Car Jacked / Bar Buddy) (4 episodes, 2007)
- Michael Strynkowski (Roommate) (1 episode, 2007)
- Monier West (Moneer Yaqubi) (9 episodes, 2007)
- Riley Steele (1 episode, 2010)
- Kaye Marie Talise

== Season 2 episodes ==
Episode	Title	Questions
202	Life-saving Farts	How can a guy make a weapon for under five bucks?; What animal can give you an erection for hours?; How can you escape from a straitjacket?; In what country are you most likely to have oral sex?; Can your farts save your buddy from drowning?; Who's the richest bitch in America?
201	Space Boobs	How could your poop save someone else's life?; What is the number one sex injury in the world?; What's the biggest handgun you can buy?; How can you survive being hit by a car?; What's the deadliest fishing in the United States?; How would big boobs bounce on the moon?
203	Military Grade Boobs	Can you freeze your farts and smell them later?; What natural disaster is most likely to kill you?; Where is the drunkest place in the universe?; What's the guaranteed way to make your penis bigger?; What is the latest sport to start testing for H.G.H. and steroids?; How have drug offenders tried to hide weed from drug-sniffing dogs?; What country's armed forces pays for fake boobs?
204	Whipping Addictions	How can you harness the power of your piss?; How can your beer gut save your life?; In which country will the chicks spend the most time banging you?; What's more nutritious: cat or dog?; Once a grenade is thrown, how long until it explodes?; How do you survive a killer bee attack?; How can what's in your toilet end up in your mouth?; What's the best way to whip an addiction?
205	Hottest Nude Beaches	What's the deadliest weapon a prisoner can hide up his ass?; Where do guys look first when they see a hot chick?; Which method of smoking weed can get a dude the highest?; How can you go without washing your underwear for a year?; How much blood can you lose before you die?; How many clothespins can you put on your face at one time?; What are the five best topless beaches in the world?
206	Beer: Boob Fertilizer	How can poop become a destructive missile?; What is the biggest bush in America?; What are the five cutest animals that can kill you?; How can beer make your girlfriend's boobs bigger?; Where can you find babes who are best in the sack?; How can a convicted criminal get sent to a cushy white-collar prison?; Do midget hookers charge half-price?
207	Big Pimpin'	What's the deadliest martial arts move in the world?; What's the one scent that's guaranteed to turn a woman on?; Who's the ultimate wing-man?; What kills Americans at the beach every year?; What's the freshest meat you can eat for free?; How much money can a pimp make?; Who's easiest: straight chicks, bi chicks or lesbians?
208	Saggy Boob Radar	Who's faster: man or sperm?; What is the horniest animal in the jungle?; How can a burger joint cure your hemorrhoids?; How can you tell if she's really a he?; What's the most bad-ass way to make two grand a week?; How can you tell if she has saggy boobs before you rip off her clothes?
209	Death By Rock	How can you untrap your pud from a zipper?; Can music be loud enough to kill you?; What do dudes like better: boobs or butts?; Where is becoming a man most likely to kill you?; How fast do you have to go to rip your muscles off the bone?; How can you survive a tiger attack?; Where have dudes made some secret sex tapes without breaking the law?
210	Working Off	What factory encouraged its workers to whack off?; Who should you pray to for a cure to your hangover?; What is being genetically altered to kick your ass?; What kind of music is most likely to make someone depressed or even suicidal?; What kills you faster: a cobra or a python?; How cold do you have to be to freeze your balls off?; Does spanking lead to horniness?
211	Animal Prostitutes	What's the secret to improving your urinal aim by 80%?; What's healthier for you: red wine or beer?; What's the most dangerous explosive known to man?; Besides humans, what's the only animal that engages in prostitution?; How can you exercise without exercising?; How long do you have to reattach a severed limb?; What animal is America's secret weapon against terror?; How much bigger have boobs gotten in the last 15 years?
212	Scuba Sex	What's in your ball sack?; What male will screw anything?; How much wood would a woodchuck chuck if a woodchuck would chuck wood? Answer: 72; What are three ways people have made money off a dead body?; How much electricity would it take to kill you?; How many patients a day wake up during surgery?; How can you literally get drunk on Grandpa?; What's the best way to have sex while scuba diving?
213	Extreme Sex Fetishes	Which animal can drink you under the table?; What are your chances of getting laid today?; How do you neutralize an astronaut who goes berserk in space?; How do blondes make you dumber?; What's the most powerful bug spray in the world?; What's the secret that experts rely on to defuse a bomb?; How much beef jerky can you get from one cow?; What are the most extreme sex fetishes in the world?

== Reception ==
Comedian Eric Andre said about the show "If Maxim Magazine and crystal meth had a baby, it would give anal birth to the show Manswers". He also says that the show is just about boobs and farts.

== Episodes ==
Episode Number	Show Rundowns	Original Airdate
101	IS THERE A MARTIAL ARTS MOVE THAT KILLS 3 DAYS LATER? HOW BIG ARE THE BIGGEST BOOBS IN THE WORLD? HOW DO YOU SHOW CARJACKERS WHO’S BOSS? HOW DO YOU DEFEND YOURSELF IN A BAR FIGHT? WHAT’S THE BEST HANGOVER CURE? WE ALL KNOW A BIG DUMP CAN HURT, BUT CAN IT KILL? THE DUMP OF DEATH. IS IT REAL OR MADE UP? YOU’VE GOT QUESTIONS? WE’VE GOT MANSWERS!	September 19th, 2007
102	HOW BIG DO BOOBS HAVE TO BE TO CRUSH BEER CANS? HOW MANY FLOORS CAN YOU FALL AND STILL SURVIVE IN AN ELEVATOR PLUNGE? WHAT IS THE MOST DANGEROUS ANIMAL IN AMERICA? HOW DO YOU TELL-- IS SHE A HOOKER OR IS SHE A COP? WHERE SHOULD YOU TAKE A PUNCH TO THE HEAD TO REDUCE THE RISK OF BRAIN DAMAGE? IS THERE A WAY TO GET DRUNK FASTER? YOU’VE GOT QUESTIONS? WE’VE GOT MANSWERS!	September 26th, 2007
103	HOW TOUGH ARE FAKE BOOBS? CAN A VENDING MACHINE KILL? WHICH IS STRONGER, SAMURAI SWORD OR SPEEDING BULLET? WHAT PERCENTAGE OF GIRLS ARE BISEXUAL? WHAT ARE THE TOP FIVE THINGS YOU CAN DO WITH YOUR OWN PEE! HOW DO YOU BREAK OUT OF HANDCUFFS? WHICH ANIMAL FARTS THE MOST? YOU’VE GOT QUESTIONS? WE’VE GOT MANSWERS!	October 3rd, 2007
104	IS THERE ANY WAY TO BEAT THE BREATHALYZER? DO BIG BOOBS FLOAT? WHERE’S THE BEST PLACE TO TAKE THE BULLET? WHAT ELSE CAN THEY DROP THESE MONSTER ENGINES INTO? WHERE’S THE WORST PLACE TO PLAY POKER? WHAT RODEO EVENT IS MORE DANGEROUS THAN BULL RIDING? WHAT’S A DOMINATRIX CRUSHING VIDEO? WHO DO YOU PRAY TO SO YOU NEVER RUN OUT OF BEER? YOU’VE GOT QUESTIONS? WE’VE GOT MANSWERS!	October 10th, 2007
105	HOW TEENIE CAN A BIKINI GET BEFORE IT’S ILLEGAL? HOW LONG CAN A MAN SURVIVE ON AN ALL-BEER DIET? WHAT’S GEORGE BUSH’S DIRTIEST LITTLE SECRET ABOUT HIS POOP? WHAT’S THE MOST DANGEROUS SPORT THAT CAN KILL YOU? HOW CAN YOU TURN A PICK UP TRUCK IN TO A HOT TUB? DOES THE SHAPE OF HER BOOBS TELL IF SHE’S HORNY? YOU’VE GOT QUESTIONS? WE’VE GOT MANSWERS!	October 17th, 2007
106	HOW LONG CAN YOU STAY ALIVE IN SPACE WITHOUT A SUIT? IS THERE A WAY TO BEAT THE DRUG TEST IN LESS THAN 24 HOURS? SHOULD ATHLETES ABSTAIN FROM SEX BEFORE A GAME? HOW CAN YOU STAY ALIVE AFTER AN ATOMIC ATTACK? HOW DO YOU DIG OUT A BULLET FROM YOURSELF? HOW DO GUYS GET A HAPPY ENDING AT A LEGITIMATE MASSAGE PARLOR? YOU’VE GOT QUESTIONS? WE’VE GOT MANSWERS!	October 24th, 2007
107	WHICH HUMAN ORGAN IS BEST TO EAT FIRST? YOU KNOW THEY CAN HACK INTO YOUR BANK HOW CAN SOMEONE FAKE YOUR FINGERPRINTS? REAL BOOBS! FAKE BOOBS! WHICH CHICKS ARE HORNIER? WHY IS WHALE VOMIT WORTH MORE THAN GOLD? HOW MUCH IS YOUR SEMEN WORTH? WHERE ARE AMERICA’S BEST WHOREHOUSES? HOW MUCH MONEY CAN YOU MAKE BEGGING? YOU’VE GOT QUESTIONS? WE’VE GOT MANSWERS!	October 31st, 2007
108	HOW MANY BEERS CAN A DUDE CHUG BEFORE HE’S DEAD? HOW CAN A GUY FIND OUT IF HE’S REALLY A NARC? WHAT KIND OF ANIMAL IS MOST LIKE A WOMAN? HOW FAR CAN YOU TOSS A DWARF? WHICH CHICKS ARE BEST IN BED? HOW CAN YOU MAKE YOUR GIRLFRIEND LESS BITCHY? YOU’VE GOT QUESTIONS? WE’VE GOT MANSWERS!	November 7th, 2007
109	HOW CAN YOU KILL HIM WITH YOUR HANDS? WHICH CHICKS ARE MOST LIKELY TO PUT OUT ON A FIRST DATE? HOW MUCH DOES A GUY FART IN ONE DAY? WHAT SMELL TURNS WOMEN ON THE MOST? CAN YOU REALLY GET HIGH FROM LEGAL STUFF YOU BUY AT A HEALTH FOOD STORE? HOW CAN YA GET SOMEBODY TO PAY YOU TO GET A TATTOO? WHO DRIVES BETTER, GUYS OR CHICKS? HOW CAN YOU TO TAKE A STRIPPER HOME? YOU’VE GOT QUESTIONS? WE’VE GOT MANSWERS!	November 14th. 2007
