= Full Disclosure (book) =

2018 memoir by Stormy Daniels

- Author: Stormy Daniels
- Genre: Memoir
- Published: October 2, 2018
- Publisher: St. Martin's Press
- Publication place: United States
- Pages: 288
- ISBN: 978-1250205568 (Hardcover)

Full Disclosure is a memoir written by Stormy Daniels with Kevin Carr O'Leary. It was published on October 2, 2018, by St. Martin's Press.

Daniels had been writing her memoir for "about 10 years." She announced the book on The View on September 12, 2018. She said that parts of her interview on 60 Minutes had been cut due to time constraints, and she believes that important details were cut from the broadcast. The book includes details of her alleged affair with Donald Trump.

Though the book opens with a foreword from Daniels' then attorney Michael Avenatti and Daniels writes warmly of him in subsequent chapters their relationship would later sour. On May 22, 2019, Avenatti was charged with fraud as a result of allegations that he stole money from Daniels while helping her negotiate the book deal for Full Disclosure.

== Summary ==
Daniels is born Stephanie Gregory to Sheila and Bill Gregory. She and her mother eventually settle in Baton Rouge, Louisiana, while her father travels for work. After the death of her maternal grandmother her father returns to announce that he is leaving the family to remarry another woman. Daniels does not see her father for three years and in the meantime her mother struggles with depression and becomes a hoarder.

At the age of nine Daniels is repeatedly raped by her friend's neighbor. Daniels believes she is protecting her friend by allowing herself to be raped in her place. A few years later when Daniels tries to reveal the abuse to her mother and a guidance counselor both dismiss her.

To stay away from her neglectful mother and her increasingly drug filled neighborhood, Daniels takes up horse riding and works several small jobs to support her hobby. In high school her father divorces his second wife and moves to California, leaving Daniels with a car and abandoning her permanently. Her mother divorces her second husband as well and Daniels moves out of the family home at seventeen. Shortly after she has a chance encounter with a stripper and goes to see her where she works. Daniels is offered a job at the strip club and she takes it.

Daniels eventually works her way into a more lucrative strip club and becomes interested in being a featured dancer, i.e. a stripper who is famous in her own right and who travels with her own tour. Mentored by Devon Michaels she creates her own act and goes on tour, eventually meeting and befriending the band Pantera. After two years, having become as successful as she can by doing only magazine work, Michaels suggests that she and Daniels go to California to work in the adult entertainment industry. While there Daniels immediately meets and begins a relationship with director Brad Armstrong who helps to build her career.

Daniels quickly becomes a contract star at Wicked Pictures. After a dispute with Armstrong on one of their films she begins writing scripts and after further arguments with directors she begins to direct as well. Armstrong later cheats on her with fellow Wicked star Jessica Drake. Shortly after, Daniels drunkenly marries Pat Myne in Las Vegas. The two try to make their marriage work but divorce after a year.

In 2006 while attending the American Century Championship, Daniels meets Donald Trump and is invited up to his suite. Stormy reluctantly has sex with him and keeps in contact with him for several months as he promises he will be able to feature her on The Apprentice. After he is unable to cast her for the upcoming season she cuts ties with him.

Daniels marries her publicist, Mike Moz, but the marriage quickly collapses. Shortly after, while trying to transition to directing music videos, Daniels meets Glendon Crain the drummer for the band Hollywood Undead. Crain and Daniels embark on a whirlwind romance and eventually decide to marry and have a child, though Daniels tells Crain that he must do porn before she will agree to a pregnancy in order to ensure that her career in adult entertainment will never be used against her in a custody battle.

Shortly after giving birth to her daughter, Daniels learns that news about her night with Trump has leaked. Still recovering from a traumatic birth and with her husband suffering from postpartum depression, Daniels denies everything. In 2011 she is once again approached by In Touch Weekly and decides to give an interview relating her sexual experiences with Trump. Daniels agrees but the story is killed. Sometime later she is approached and threatened by a stranger telling her to leave Trump alone. In 2015 Trump announces he is running for president. Daniels repeatedly struggles with whether to come forward or not and is instead offered money to sign an NDA which she accepts.

In 2018 the Wall Street Journal publishes a story about Daniels and the hush payments she received. After Trump's lawyer, Michael Cohen, begins shopping around a memoir using her name, Daniels decides to hire a lawyer, Michael Avenatti, in order to release herself from her NDA. As she prepares to come forward she is repeatedly threatened with death and hounded by the paparazzi. To protect her daughter, Daniels pulls her from school and hires private tutors. Her marriage also suffers as a result as her husband is angered that Daniels never told him about the encounter with Trump.

On May 22, 2019, lawyer Michael Avenatti was charged with wire fraud and aggravated identity theft as a result of allegations that he stole $300,000 from Daniels while helping negotiate her 2018 book deal. On February 4, 2022, Avenatti was convicted in New York federal court of identity theft and wire fraud for stealing from Daniels. He was ordered to surrender to U.S. Marshals by February 7 and is scheduled to be sentenced in May.

Daniels comes forward and speaks about her experiences with Trump in interviews with 60 Minutes and Rolling Stone. She is invited to appear on Saturday Night Live as herself.

In an epilogue she reveals that she is still struggling with her newfound fame and that, while her husband filed for divorce acrimoniously, they are now co-parenting in a mutually supportive way.

== Reception ==
The memoir drew positive reviews. Slate praised Daniels as "a witty, scrappy underdog" Kirkus Reviews called it "lively, candid".

During her May 2024 court testimony, Daniels acknowledged that at least one of the books claims was inaccurate.
