= Saints Row 2 (mobile) =

2008 video game

- Developer: G5 Entertainment
- Publisher: THQ Wireless
- Series: Saints Row
- Platform: Mobile
- Release: October 2008
- Genre: Action
- Mode: Single-player

Saints Row 2 is a mobile tie-in action game developed by Swedish studio G5 Entertainment and published by THQ Wireless to accompany the Saints Row 2 console game. It was released in October 2008. The game follows the story of the series, where the player returns from jail and fights to protect and expand their gang's territory. The player can steal, carjack, mug, shoot, stab, and kill non-player characters. There are special minigames for robbing, stealing, and carjacking. Completing missions earns money to be spent towards replenishing supplies and player upgrades. Reviewers contended that the game was too large for the small screen, which exacerbated difficult driving controls.

== Gameplay ==
Screenshot of gameplay, with a minimap in the lower left corner and corpses in the street

The game's story mimics that of the console game: the player character returns to the city of Stilwater following a bid in prison and must restore the atrophied influence of their gang, the Saints. The player can kill, threaten, rob, carjack, and otherwise force other gangs out of Saints territory. For example, player objectives in the tutorial mission include hijacking a car, killing a policeman, driving to a "Forgive & Forget" location to lose the police pursuit, and mugging a pedestrian. Locations throughout the city help the player, such as fast food restaurants that restore health, gun stores for firepower, and spray paint shops to decoy the player when pursued by the police. An on-screen minimap displays nearby locations, and there is a larger citywide map on the pause screen that does not show detailed locations. The city is split into zones, and the game's mission objectives largely consist of driving to locations and shooting things. Mission examples include assassinations, bomb-planting, and robbery.

The player can fight with a knife received early in the game (Note: The knife, called the "pig sticker", is received in a level where the player stabs a policeman near a police station.) and later with firearms that feature auto-aim. There are also sequences where the player can snipe enemies with a sniper rifle. Enemies do not hide due to a lack of a cover system. The player can earn money by finishing missions and robbing pedestrians, which can then be used to buy food, weaponry, spray paint, and accessories for the character's home. The mobile game features minigames for robbing pedestrians, stealing, and hijacking vehicles. While robbing, the player taps happy and angry face icons to terrorize the victim into giving more money. When stealing, a Tetris clone lets the player fit more items into the truck, and the carjacking minigame lets the player earn more money for scaring the captive passenger by driving at high speeds.

When driving, control options include "directional steering" where "left" and "right" controls the vehicle in that direction (like a steering wheel) and "up" accelerates, and another option where the player presses a button corresponding to the desired direction. The player targets enemies by pressing the pound key and then pressing "5" repeatedly, which also leaves the character vulnerable. Players can run faster than the cars can drive.

== Development ==
Saints Row 2 is a mobile tie-in action game modeled after the Saints Row 2 console game. It was developed by G5 Entertainment, where it was known as "Project Sienna" during development, and published by THQ Wireless on the Java 2 Micro Edition (J2ME) platform. The game was built on their proprietary Talisman engine, which G5 Senior Producer Mike Zakharov said in 2008 enabled the game to have a big environment with many things to do as "one of the most complex modern mobile games". As compared with its preceding mobile tie-in game (associated with the original Saints Row), the Saints Row 2 mobile game fixed issues of small sprites and too much traffic. Additionally, the developers changed the camera perspective from directly overhead to a slight angle. Saints Row 2 for mobile devices was first announced in June 2008 and released in October. It is compatible with the Nokia N95 and Nokia N81.

== Reception ==
Reception

Review scores
Publication	Score
1Up.com	B
IGN	6/10
Pocket Gamer	6/10

IGN's Levi Buchanan described the game as somewhere between a traditional tie-in game and a cash grab, and "ambitious" but limited by the confines of the mobile platform. He added the game appeared forced onto the platform despite its inability to support open world gameplay. Keith Andrew of Pocket Gamer felt similarly, and Rob Hearn of the same outlet also complained of how the large sprites restricted screen space and made driving slower. IGN's Buchanan felt that the screen was too small to fit so much action, especially due to the size of the minimap, and though the city "looks alive", it became "a painful obstacle course". He found driving difficult between its controls and his inability to plan for the offscreen unknown. Pocket Gamer's Andrew also found both driving controls complicated and found himself accidentally killing pedestrians and thus getting into police chases. On the other hand, Andrew Podolsky of 1UP.com enjoyed driving through the destructible environments.

IGN's Buchanan found the enemy artificial intelligence weak. Since no one takes cover, "they just stand there to be shot." He added that the game was sufficiently long past the player's interest to continue, and that the game's sound was "unimpressive". 1UP.com's Podolsky called the game a "worthwhile download" and while noting that violent mobile games were rare, said the game looked "nearly identical" to the 2007 mobile tie-in game for American Gangster, though Saints Row was more violent. He added that the game's story was not interesting.

Keith Andrew of Pocket Gamer wrote that the mobile game was "like ... no other" since the player could "watch life flow by" without providing input. He added that the game's primary task was staying alive since almost everyone other than the pedestrians and teammates are against the Saints. Andrew acknowledged the limitations of the top-down view on mobile and thought that the developers did the best job possible considering their platform's limitations, but asked, "Is a game like Saints Row really made for your mobile?"

== Notes and references ==
Notes
