= Riley Steele =

American pornographic film actress (born 1987/1988)

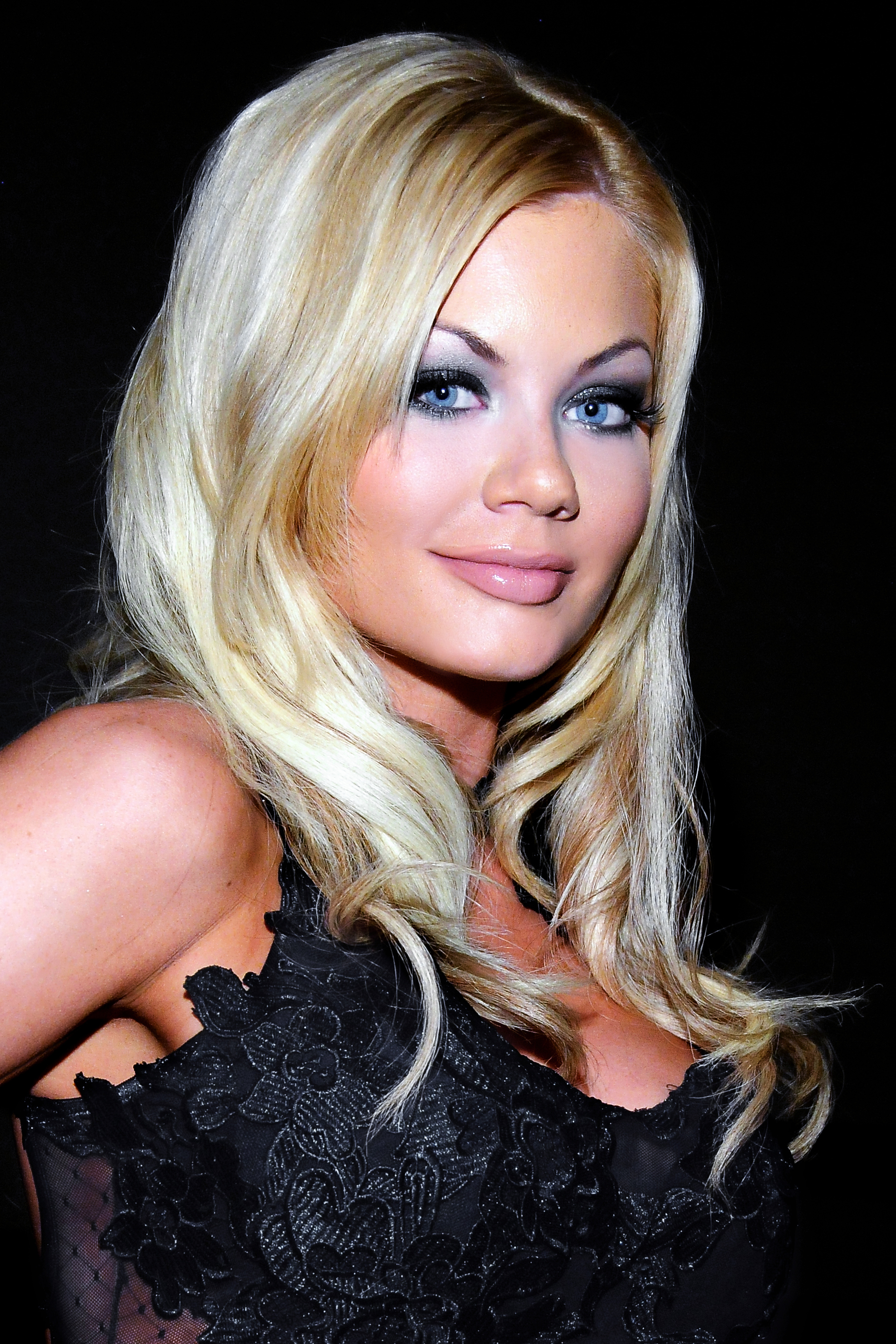
- Steele in 2015
- Born: 1987 or 1988 (age 38–39); San Diego, California, U.S.
- Occupation: Pornographic film actress
- Years active: 2008–present

Riley Steele (born 1987 or 1988) is an American pornographic film actress. A former barista, she started her pornography career in 2008. She has won several industry awards, including NightMoves Award and XBIZ Award. Throughout her career, she posed for various publications, including High Society, Hustler, and Penthouse, and also appeared in several mainstream films, such as Piranha 3D, Manswers, Life on Top, NTSF:SD:SUV::, and The Girl's Guide to Depravity.

== Early life ==
Steele was born in San Diego, California, and grew up in Escondido, California. Before starting her adult film career, she worked at Starbucks and at a golf course snack bar.

== Career ==
In 2005, Steele traveled to Hollywood, Los Angeles, for the signing of Pirates. There, she met Jesse Jane, who advised her to get into the adult industry. Steele did not contact Digital Playground until a couple of years later on February 29, 2008. Joone, the founder of Digital Playground, signed her to an exclusive contract that same day; she was 19. In 2009, Steele starred in an adult film with former UFC fighter War Machine. In January 2011, Steele co-hosted the AVN Awards.

During her career, Steele appeared in the covers or issues of several publications, such as Club, Cheri, High Society, Hustler, Penthouse, and Video World, among others. She also acted in several mainstream films and television series, including Piranha 3D (2010), Manswers (2010), Life on Top (2011), NTSF:SD:SUV:: (2011), and The Girl's Guide to Depravity (2012).

On September 20, 2013, Steele signed a two-year contract with director Axel Braun. In 2014, about how she would prepare for retirement from pornography, Steele stated: "I have my real estate license, so [I'm] selling properties and owning and also renting them out. That's something I've been working on. I've also been thinking of opening my own hair salon one day."

== Mainstream filmography ==
Film
Year	Title	Role	Notes
2010	Piranha 3D	Crystal	Supporting role

Television
Year	Title	Role	Notes
2010	Manswers	Herself	Season 4, episode 3
2011	Life on Top	Tippi	10 episodes
2011	NTSF:SD:SUV::	Erica	Season 1, episode 7
2012	The Girl's Guide to Depravity	Kaylie	9 episodes

== Awards ==
List of accolades
Awards & nominations
Award	Won	Nominated
AVN Awards	12	14
Doppio Senso Night Awards	1	–
Exxxotica Fanny Awards	1	2
NightMoves Awards	9	5
RogReviews Awards	1	1
Sex Awards	2	4
XBIZ Awards	5	10
XRCO Awards	1	3
- Total number of wins and nominations
Totals	32	39

Year	Ceremony	Category	Work
2011	AVN Award	Best All-Girl Group Sex Scene	Body Heat (with Kayden Kross, Jesse Jane, Katsuni, and Raven Alexis)
2011	AVN Award	Wildest Sex Scene (Fan Award)	Body Heat (with Kayden Kross, Jesse Jane, Katsuni, and Raven Alexis)
2011	AVN Award	Crossover Star of the Year	—N/a
2011	XBIZ Award	Crossover Star of the Year	—N/a
2011	XRCO Award	Mainstream Adult Media Favourite	—N/a
2012	AVN Award	Best Body (Fan Award)	—N/a
2012	AVN Award	Favourite Porn Star (Fan Award)	—N/a
2012	AVN Award	Hottest Sex Scene (Fan Award)	Babysitters 2 (with Jesse Jane, Kayden Kross, Stoya, BiBi Jones, and Manuel Ferrara)
2012	AVN Award	Twitter Queen (Fan Award)	—N/a
2012	NightMoves Award	Best Overall Body (Fan's Choice)	—N/a
2013	AVN Award	Favourite Body (Fan Award)	—N/a
2013	AVN Award	Favourite Porn Star (Fan Award)	—N/a
2013	RogReviews Award	Favorite Female Performer	—N/a
2013	XBIZ Award	Best Scene – Vignette Release	In Riley's Panties (with Erik Everhard)
2013	XBIZ Award	Best Scene – All-Girl	Mothers & Daughters (with Jesse Jane, Kayden Kross, Selena Rose, and Vicki Chase)
2013	NightMoves Award	Best Overall Body (Fan's Choice)	—N/a
2013	Sex Award	Porn's Perfect Boy/Girl Screen Couple	(with Erik Everhard)
2013	Sex Award	Porn's Best Body	—N/a
2014	AVN Award	Favourite Female Porn Star (Fan Award)	—N/a
2014	XBIZ Award	Best Scene – Feature Movie	Code of Honor (with Jesse Jane, Stoya, Kayden Kross, Selena Rose, and Manuel Ferrara)
2014	NightMoves Award	Best Body (Fan's Choice)	—N/a
2014	NightMoves Award	Best All Sex Release (Fan's Choice)	Riley Goes Gonzo
2014	NightMoves Award	Best Parody Drama (Fan's Choice)	Snow White XXX: An Axel Braun Parody
2014	Fanny Award	Best Oral	—N/a
2015	AVN Award	Favourite Female Pornstar (Fan Award)	—N/a
2015	NightMoves Award	Best Body (Fan's Choice)	—N/a
2016	XBIZ Award	Best Actress – Parody Release	Barbarella XXX: An Axel Braun Parody
2016	Doppio Senso Night Award	Best International Actress	Barbarella XXX: An Axel Braun Parody
2016	NightMoves Award	Best Body (Fan's Choice)	—N/a
2017	NightMoves Award	Best Body (Fan's Choice)	—N/a
2019	NightMoves Award	Best Body (Fan's Choice)	—N/a
2025	AVN Award	Hall of Fame	—N/a

== See also ==
- List of pornographic film actors who appeared in mainstream films
