= Stormy Daniels =

American pornographic actress (born 1979)

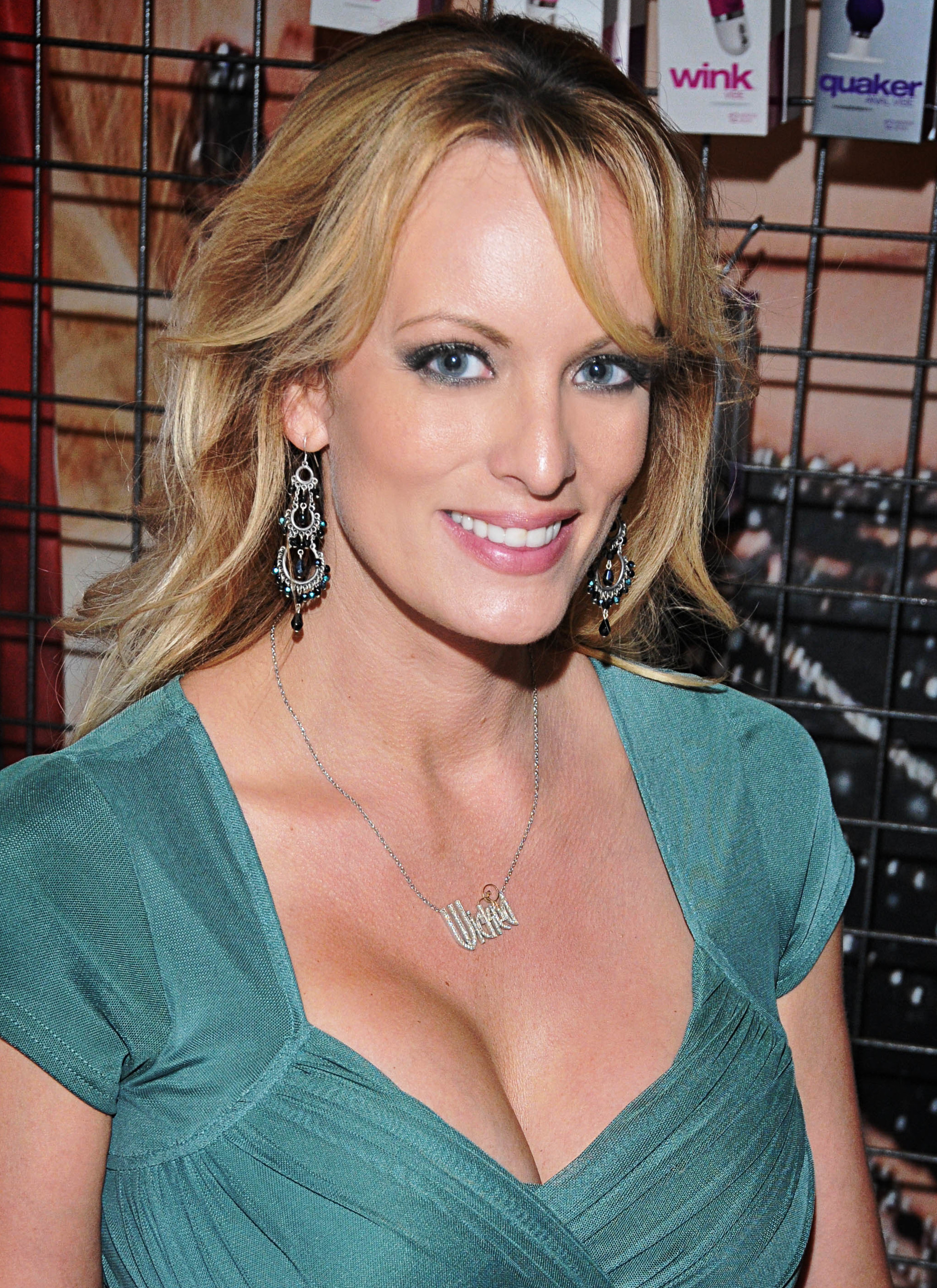
- Daniels in 2015
- Born: Stephanie A. Gregory; March 17, 1979 (age 47); Baton Rouge, Louisiana, U.S.
- Occupations: Pornographic film actress; stripper; film director
- Known for: Stormy Daniels–Donald Trump scandal, pornographic career
- Political party: Republican (2010–present); Democratic (before 2010)
- Spouses: Pat Myne (m. 2003; div. 2005) Mike Moz (m. 2007; div. 2009) Brendon Miller (m. 2015; div. 2018) Barrett Blade (m. 2022)
- Children: 1
- Website: stormydaniels.com

Signature
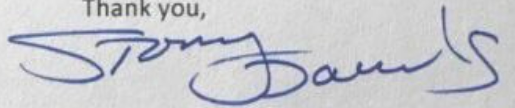

Stephanie A. Gregory Clifford (born Stephanie A. Gregory; March 17, 1979), known professionally as Stormy Daniels, is an American pornographic film actress, director, and former stripper. She has won many industry awards and is a member of the NightMoves Hall of Fame, AVN Hall of Fame, XRCO Hall of Fame, and Vanity Fair Hall of Fame.

Daniels became involved in a legal dispute with U.S. president Donald Trump in 2018. Trump's attorney Michael Cohen paid $130,000 in hush money to silence her about an affair she says she had with Trump in 2006. Trump denied the affair and accused her of lying. He was charged with 34 felony counts of falsifying business records to conceal payments made to Daniels, and was convicted on May 30, 2024.

== Early life ==
Daniels's parents, Sheila and Bill Gregory, divorced about three or four years after she was born. She was then raised by her mother.

She graduated from Scotlandville Magnet High School in Baton Rouge, Louisiana, in 1997 and considered becoming a journalist.

Daniels said she "came from an average, lower-income household… there [were] days without electricity", and she has described herself as coming from a "really bad neighborhood." During high school, Daniels had a job answering phones at a riding stable.

== Career ==
Daniels's first experience as a stripper occurred when she was 17 and visiting a friend at a strip club; she was convinced to perform a "guest set". She began stripping for money at the Gold Club in Baton Rouge and became a featured entertainer with Continental Theatrical Agency in September 2000. She chose her stage name Stormy Daniels to reflect her love of American rock band Mötley Crüe, whose bassist, Nikki Sixx, named his daughter Storm, and that her father considered naming her Stormy before her mother's choice of Stephanie.

According to Daniels, her career as a pornographic actress started in 2002 with scenes for Sin City and Wicked Pictures. In 2004, Daniels won the Best New Starlet Award from Adult Video News, which was a surprise to Daniels herself, who had made a $500 bet with another actress that Jesse Jane would win. She has directed for Wicked since 2004. Daniels has appeared with performers such as Randy Spears, Julian and Brendon Miller, to whom she was married and who edited about half of her movies. Daniels was inducted into the AVN Hall of Fame on January 18, 2014, and was inducted into the XRCO Hall of Fame on April 16, 2014. Her directorial work that year earned 14 AVN Award nominations including a nomination for Best Safe Sex Scene for her performance with Brendon Miller in François Clousot's First Crush.

Daniels toured strip clubs as part of a 2018 "Make America Horny Again" tour. She was given the key to the city of West Hollywood, California, on "Stormy Daniels Day", May 23, 2018. Daniels was named to host the 2019 XBIZ Awards.

=== Mainstream appearances ===
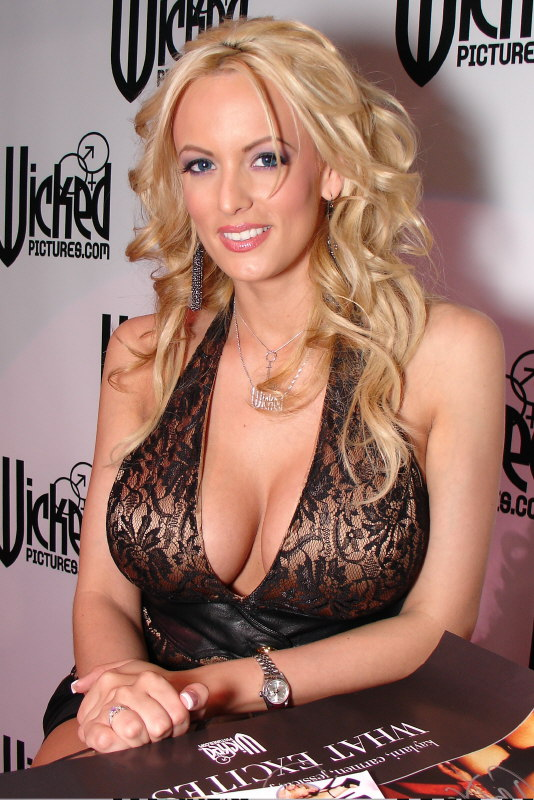
Daniels in 2007

==== United States ====
Daniels also appeared in erotic films, such as The Witches of Breastwick (2005), and other non-pornographic productions.

Daniels appeared in an episode of Real Sex where she is seen participating in 2001 Miss Nude Great Plains Contest. She appeared in Pornucopia in 2004. In early 2007, she appeared in Dirt on the FX Network, where she played a stripper who helps to set up a basketball player played by Rick Fox. Later in 2007, Daniels appeared in Maroon 5's music video for their song "Wake Up Call" as a pole dancer. In 2009, she appeared in one episode of Party Down, where she played a pornographic actress.

The actress appears in the film The 40-Year-Old Virgin (2005), when the main character (played by Steve Carell) watches her in the video Space Nuts: Episode 69—Unholy Union and then tries dreaming about her. She appears in the film Knocked Up (2007) as a lap dancer.

Daniels appeared on Saturday Night Live in the cold open as herself on May 5, 2018. She appeared as a model in artist Nika Nesgoda's 2002 photographic series Virgin, portraying the Virgin Mary. In 2020, she appeared as a guest on The Eric Andre Show.

==== Celebrity Big Brother ====
In 2018, there was wide speculation that Daniels would be a housemate on Celebrity Big Brother 22 in the United Kingdom. Despite the reports, Daniels did not enter the house on launch night.

Speculation about her absence included demands for more money, a legal affair involving her husband, and a desire to spend time with her daughter. Her attorney Michael Avenatti told the Press Association that Daniels was in fact set to enter the house, but producers attempted to manipulate her into acting a certain way.

A Big Brother statement read: "Stormy Daniels was booked to appear on the show several months ago and hours before the show was due to go live, informed the production team that she no longer wished to enter the house as previously agreed. Producers discussed a variety of options with her but were unable to agree any acceptable conditions for her entering the house. Our focus is now on making a brilliant series with our fantastic celebrities."

Daniels said that she offered to appear on the show during the live launch to explain her absence, but was turned down by producers.

On the August 17 edition of spin-off show Big Brother's Bit on the Side, host Rylan Clark explained that just five hours before the first live show, Daniels said she only wanted to appear on launch night and then leave. Big Brother tried to negotiate a compromise, but nothing came of it. Clark also insisted that money was not a factor and there was no attempt from producers to try to manipulate her to achieve a specific outcome.

== Politics ==
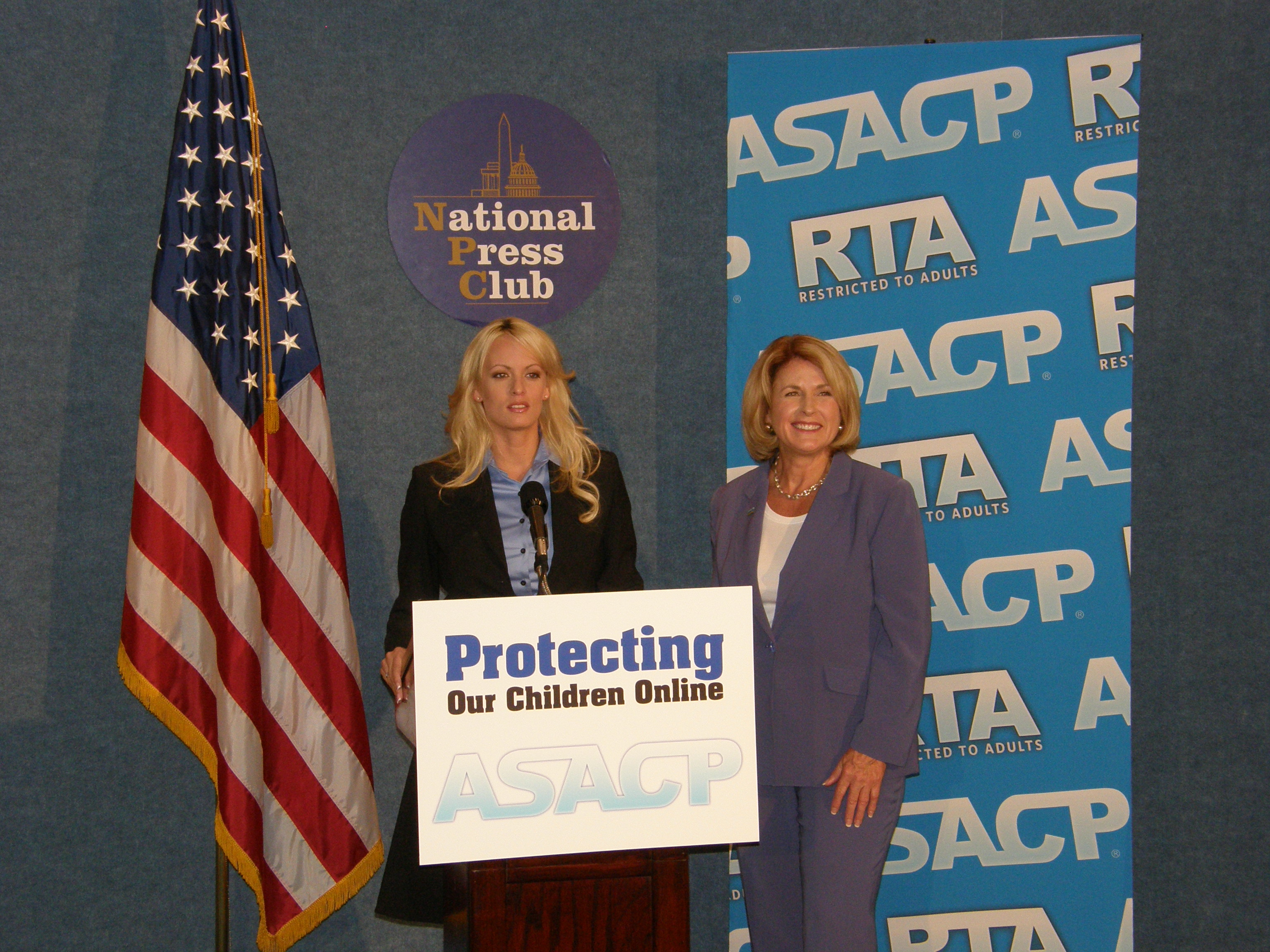
Daniels speaking at the National Press Club in 2008

A group of fans attempted to recruit Daniels to run against Republican senator David Vitter in Louisiana in 2010. The recruitment process was centered around the website DraftStormy.com. On May 21, 2009, she formed an exploratory committee, initially inspired by revelations about "Vitter's connections to a prostitution ring". In August 2009, her campaign manager's car was blown up, although no one was in the car at that time.

Daniels finally declared herself a Republican candidate on April 6, 2010. Her decision was inspired by disclosures that the Republican National Committee (RNC) had paid expenses for fundraisers at a "lesbian bondage themed nightclub" in Los Angeles, stating that the revelations "finally tipped the scales". She explained that the RNC's use of party funds for sex convinced her that Republicans represented her libertarian values best: Daniels said she has been a registered Democrat throughout her life, "But now I cannot help but recognize that over time my libertarian values regarding both money and sex and the legal use of one for the other is now best espoused by the Republican Party."

She made several listening tours around Louisiana to focus on the economy, as well as women in business and child protection and stated that if elected, she would likely retire from the adult industry. On April 15, 2010, she announced that she would not run, due to the unaffordable cost and media not taking her candidacy seriously.

== Personal life ==
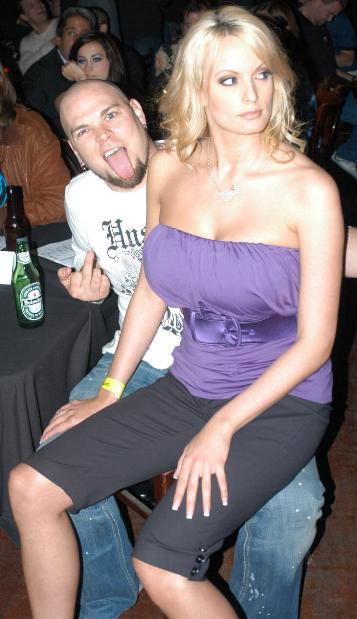
Daniels attending the 2007 XRCO Awards with her then husband Mike Moz

Daniels lives in Forney, Texas.

Daniels was married to Pat Myne. She was married to Michael "Mike Moz" Mosny from 2007 to 2009. She was arrested in July 2009 pertaining to a domestic violence charge by Mosny. In 2015 she married Brendon Miller, with whom she has a daughter. Miller filed for divorce in July 2018. In 2022, she married porn star Barrett Blade.

Daniels has been fond of horses her entire life; she owns several and has won multiple blue ribbons at equestrian events. Daniels came out as bisexual in 2019.

== Legal affairs ==
=== Trump affair allegations ===
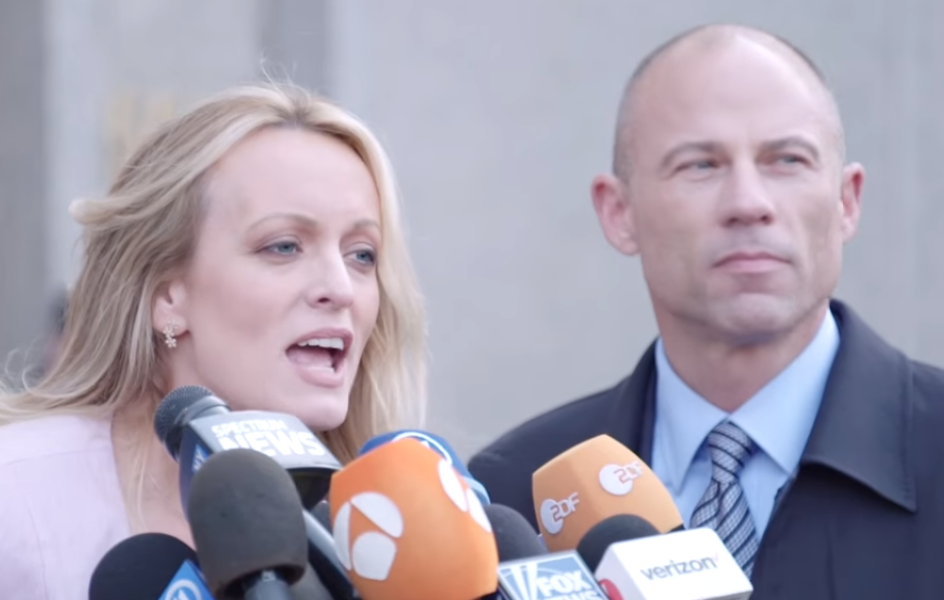
Daniels holding a press conference with her lawyer Michael Avenatti in 2018

In October 2016, shortly before the presidential election, Donald Trump's personal lawyer Michael Cohen paid Daniels $130,000 to deny that she had an affair with Trump a decade earlier in 2006. Trump's spokespeople have denied the affair and accused Daniels of lying.

In January 2018, the affair and payoff were reported by the Wall Street Journal. Subsequently in January:

- On behalf of his client, Cohen denied the existence of an affair between Trump and Daniels. Later he stated: "In a private transaction in 2016, I used my own personal funds to facilitate a payment of $130,000 to Ms. Stephanie Clifford."
- Daniels issued a statement saying the affair "never happened".
- In Touch Weekly magazine published a transcript of an interview in which Daniels described her year-long relationship with Trump, including a sexual encounter. In Touch had interviewed Daniels in 2011 but did not publish the interview until January 2018.

On March 6, 2018, Daniels filed a lawsuit against Trump. She said that the non-disclosure agreement that she had signed in reference to the alleged affair was invalid because Trump had never personally signed it. The suit also alleges that Trump's attorney had been trying to intimidate Daniels and "scare her into not talking". A day later, Cohen initiated an arbitration process which resulted in an order that barred Daniels from disclosing "confidential information" related to the non-disclosure agreement. The order itself, which Daniels's lawyers called bogus, was supposed to remain confidential.

In a March 25, 2018, interview with 60 Minutes, Daniels said that she and Trump had sex once, and that later she had been threatened in front of her infant daughter and felt pressured to sign a non-disclosure agreement. On April 9, 2018, FBI agents raided Cohen's office and seized emails, tax documents and business records relating to several matters, including payments to Daniels.

On April 30, 2018, Daniels filed a lawsuit against Trump on libel charges because he called her statements "fraud". It related to Trump's statements on Twitter saying that Daniels had invented the story of the man who threatened her after she decided to tell journalists about their affair. In October 2018, the suit was dismissed on First Amendment grounds, and Daniels lost her appeal in August 2020. Daniels was ordered to pay $293,000 of Trump's legal fees after her libel case against Trump was dismissed, then was ordered to pay an additional $245,000 after appeals. In 2023, Daniels lost her appeal to reduce the payment for Trump's fees, and was ordered to further pay $120,000. Collectively, Daniels was ordered to pay over $600,000 to Trump's law firm due to the defamation suit, but as of 2022 she vowed not to pay.

In August 2018, Cohen reached a plea deal with prosecutors, saying he paid off Daniels "at the direction of the ... candidate" and "for the principal purpose of influencing the election". In September 2018, Cohen offered to invalidate the non-disclosure agreement with Daniels if she would refund the $130,000 Cohen's company paid to her. Lawyers for Trump declared on September 8 that Trump would neither enforce the non-disclosure agreement nor contest Daniels's claim that it is invalid.

On April 15, 2024, a trial began in New York City, in which Trump faced 34 felony charges of falsifying business records with the intent to commit or conceal other crimes with respect to the hush money payments made to Daniels. Testimony during the trial revealed that the $130,000 hush money agreement was drafted by Daniels's former lawyer Keith Davidson. In the agreement, Daniels was given the pseudonym "Peggy Peterson," while Trump was given the pseudonym "David Dennison." Daniels testified on May 7, 2024, describing, among other things, her reported sexual encounter with Trump and their year-long relationship. Daniels also stated that a waiver statement she signed denying the affair was false and that the non-disclosure agreement made it she would lose $1,000,000 for every occasion she told her story. On May 13, 2024, during trial testimony, Cohen confirmed details about the non-disclosure agreement including how it was his idea to include a clause which made it so Daniels would be penalized $1,000,000 for every occasion she told her story, which would violate the agreement. On May 14, Cohen also testified that the statement Daniels signed was false, noting how he pressed Davidson to get Daniels to sign the waiver. Cohen also stated that he agreed to let Daniels appear on Fox News's Hannity: she did not go through with it.

=== Arrest in Columbus, Ohio ===
Daniels was arrested in Columbus, Ohio, in a sting operation by undercover vice squad detectives on July 12, 2018. Authorities accused her of "fondling" patrons and police officers in violation of Ohio strip club law. While Daniels was booked into the county jail, two other female adult entertainers who were arrested at the club for the same alleged violations were given summonses to appear in court and (unlike Daniels) did not have their mugshots taken. Daniels retained Columbus defense lawyer Chase Mallory, who worked with prosecutors to dismiss the charges less than 12 hours later, saying that the law did not apply to out-of-town performers.

Daniels's personal attorney, Michael Avenatti, vowed to sue the local police on the grounds that the arrest was politically motivated. It was later revealed that the lead detective on the vice squad in charge of the arrest was a supporter of Donald Trump. Emails belonging to another vice squad detective who made the arrest reportedly showed that days before Daniels arrived in Columbus, the detective had already obtained pictures/videos of Daniels and the location of her planned performance.

A day after the arrest, the Columbus police chief declared that "a mistake was made" during the arrest, as "one element of the law was missed in error." In January 2019, Daniels filed suit in federal court against the City of Columbus, alleging police were politically motivated when they arrested her and seeking $2 million in damages. In March 2019, an internal police investigation found that Daniels's arrest by the four undercover officers was improper, but not premeditated or political in nature. In August 2019, Columbus Division of Police interim chief Tom Quinlan announced that five Columbus police officers faced departmental punishment for their roles in the arrest for violating rules of conduct. In September 2019, the parties agreed to settle the federal lawsuit, with Daniels receiving $450,000 in compensation.

== Awards ==
List of accolades received by Stormy Daniels
| Award | Won |
|---|---|
| AVN Awards | 9 |
| XRCO Awards | 4 |
| XBIZ Awards | 4 |
| F.A.M.E. Awards | 4 |
| Fanny Awards | 1 |
| NightMoves Awards | 10 |
| Adam Film World Guide Awards | 3 |
| Pornhub Awards | 1 |
| Venus Awards | 1 |
| Other Awards | 7 |
| Total number of wins | 44 |

=== As a performer ===
| Year | Ceremony | Award | Work |
|---|---|---|---|
| 2004 | AVN Award | Best New Starlet | —N/a |
| 2004 | Adam Film World Guide Award | Contract Babe of the Year | Wicked Pictures |
| 2004 | NightMoves Award | Best Actress (Editor's Choice) | —N/a |
| 2005 | High Society | Centerfold of the Year | —N/a |
| 2006 | AVN Award | Best Supporting Actress – Video | Camp Cuddly Pines Powertool Massacre |
| 2006 | Adam Film World Guide Award | Crossover Female Performer of the Year | —N/a |
| 2006 | XRCO Award | Mainstream Adult Media Favorite | —N/a |
| 2006 | F.A.M.E. Award | Favorite Breasts | —N/a |
| 2006 | Exotic Dancer Award | Adult Movie Feature Entertainer of the Year | —N/a |
| 2006 | NightMoves Award | Best Actress (Fan's Choice) | —N/a |
| 2006 | NightMoves Award | Triple Play Award (Dancing/Performing/Directing) | —N/a |
| 2007 | AVN Award | Contract Star of the Year | Wicked Pictures |
| 2007 | Penthouse | February Pet of the Month | —N/a |
| 2007 | Penthouse | Golden G-String Award | —N/a |
| 2007 | AEBN VOD Award | Performer of the Year | —N/a |
| 2007 | F.A.M.E. Award | Favorite Breasts | —N/a |
| 2007 | NightMoves Award | Best Feature Dancer (Fan's Choice) | —N/a |
| 2008 | AVN Award | Crossover Star of the Year | —N/a |
| 2008 | XBIZ Award | Crossover Star of the Year | —N/a |
| 2008 | XRCO Award | Mainstream Adult Media Favorite | —N/a |
| 2008 | Adam Film World Guide Award | Actress of the Year | —N/a |
| 2009 | XBIZ Award | ASACP Service Recognition Award | —N/a |
| 2009 | F.A.M.E. Award | Favorite Breasts | —N/a |
| 2009 | Free Speech Coalition | Positive Image Award | —N/a |
| 2013 | AVN | Game Changer | —N/a |
| 2018 | Venus Award | Lifetime Achievement Award | —N/a |
| 2019 | AVN Award | Mainstream Star of the Year | —N/a |
| 2019 | XBIZ Award | Crossover Star of the Year | —N/a |
| 2020 | AVN Award | Mainstream Venture of the Year | Full Disclosure |
| 2023 | Pornhub Award | Lifetime Achievement Award | —N/a |

=== As a director ===
| Year | Ceremony | Award |
|---|---|---|
| 2005 | NightMoves Award | Best New Director (Editor's Choice) |
| 2006 | AVN Award | Best Screenplay – Video |
| 2008 | XRCO Award | Best Director – Features (tied with Brad Armstrong) |
| 2008 | F.A.M.E. Award | Favorite Director |
| 2008 | NightMoves Award | Best Director (Fan's Choice) |
| 2009 | NightMoves Award | Best Director (Editor's Choice) |
| 2012 | NightMoves Award | Best Director – Non-Parody (Editor's Choice) |
| 2013 | Fanny Award | Director of the Year |
| 2016 | XBIZ Award | Director of the Year – Feature Release |
| 2016 | NightMoves Award | Best Director – Feature (Fan's Choice) |

Hall of Fame

| Year | Ceremony | Award |
|---|---|---|
| 2007 | NightMoves Award | Hall of Fame |
| 2014 | AVN Award | Hall of Fame |
| 2014 | XRCO Award | Hall of Fame |
| 2018 | Vanity Fair | Hall of Fame |

== See also ==
- List of pornographic film actors who appeared in mainstream films
