= Association of Sites Advocating Child Protection =

US nonprofit organization

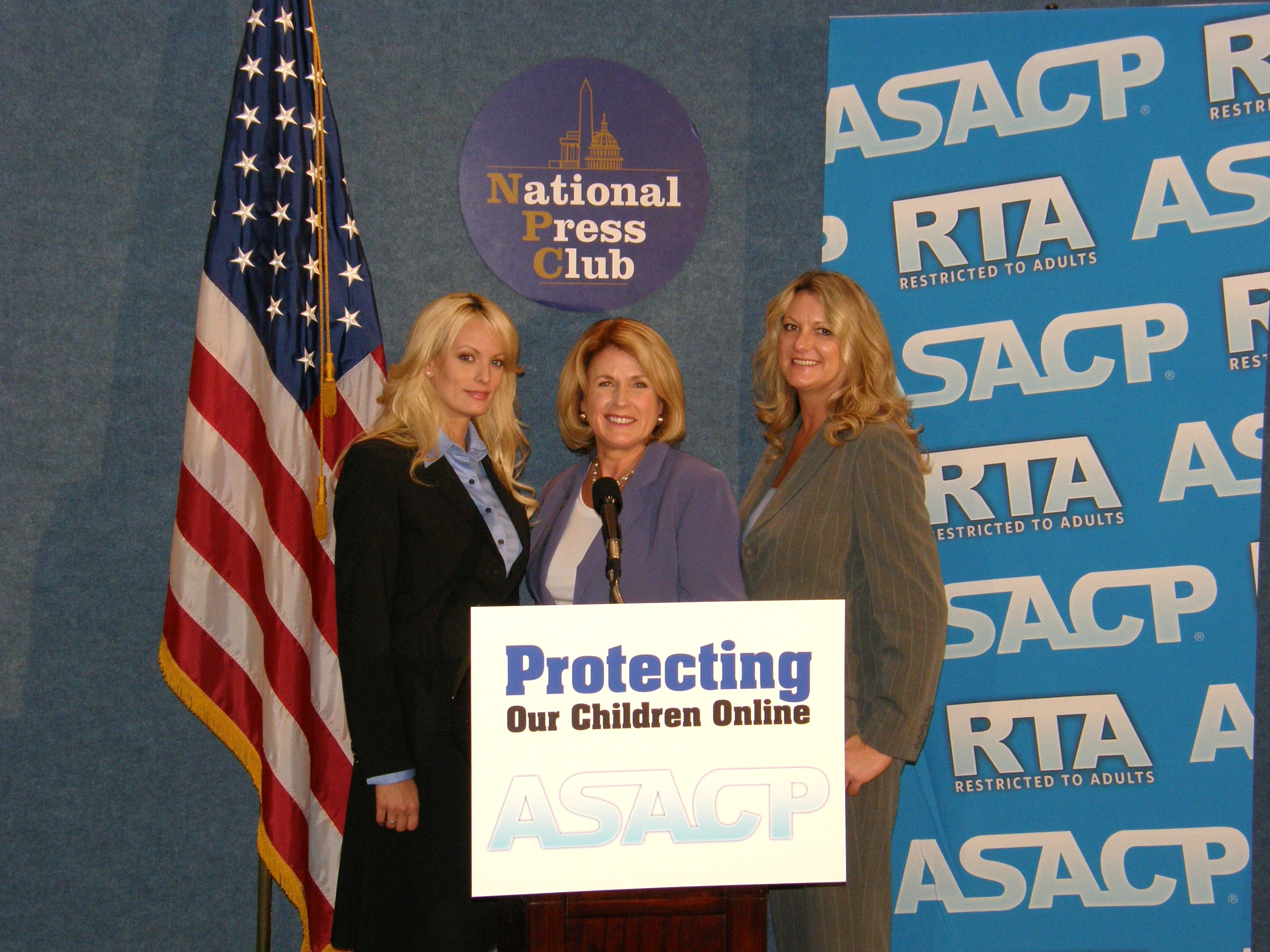
- Stormy Daniels, Joan Irvine, and Joy King at a press conference in Washington, D.C., in May 2008
- Formation: 1996; 30 years ago
- Founder: Alec Helmy
- Website: asacp.org

The Association of Sites Advocating Child Protection (ASACP) is an American nonprofit organization that fights Internet child pornography and works to help parents prevent children from viewing age-inappropriate material online.

Most of ASACP's funding comes from sponsoring companies in the online adult entertainment industry. There are hundreds of ASACP member companies, comprising thousands of websites. All ASACP member sites are required to agree with the group's code of ethics.

== Overview ==
ASACP was founded in 1996 by Alec Helmy, founder and president of XBIZ as a hotline where website operators and users could report child pornography on the internet. ASACP's online child pornography reporting hotline receives thousands of reports per month. ASACP investigates to determine the hosting, billing, IP address, ownership, and linkage of suspected child pornography sites. ASACP then forwards information to law enforcement, the National Center for Missing & Exploited Children (NCMEC), and hotlines in other countries. Sites can also be shut down by reporting them to their web hosts and domain name registrars. In April 2007, the organization announced that their online reporting system had registered its 200,000th report from internet users.

In late 2006, ASACP launched the RTA ("Restricted to Adults") website label. RTA is a meta tag that webmasters place in the page headers of adult websites to better enable parental filtering. On June 22, 2007, ASACP held a press conference to officially announce the RTA website label.

Numerous major pornographic sites use the RTA label, including, Pornhub, xHamster, XVideos and Kink.com.

== See also ==
- Internet Watch Foundation
- International Centre for Missing & Exploited Children; combats child sexual exploitation, child pornography, and child abduction.
