= Arrangement Finders =

- Type: Private
- Industry: Prostitution
- Key people: Kayden Kross (President)
- Services: Match making
- Parent: Ruby Inc (formerly Avid Life Media)
- Website: arrangementfinders.com

Arrangement Finders (also known as ArrangementFinders.com) is a North America-based sugar baby and sugar daddy dating Matchmaking service, with its headquarters in Toronto, Ontario. The parent company is Ruby Inc (formerly Avid Life Media).

== History ==
The website intends to introduce younger women in need of financial support to successful men. Arrangement Finders has 3.6 million active members and is adding 3,000 members daily. The website is branded as a dating website that allows people to converse and form mutually beneficial arrangements as opposed to one-time meetups.

In 2015, the company's president and award-winning porn star, Kayden Kross, signed a former Wall Street intern, Veronica Vain, for a porn movie. She reportedly left her day job as an investor researcher for a XXX-rated movie career to debut in Screwing Wall Street. The movie was used to promote Arrangement Finders.

== Controversy ==
=== Bree Olson billboards ===
The brand received controversial coverage when pornstar Bree Olson was depicted on one of its billboards in Chicago—a region the company is mainly targeting for having most of its members.

An additional billboard labeled "Hey Students, Need a Summer Job? Date a Sugar Daddy" was taken down by the city of Birmingham and Jefferson County.

A billboard labeled "Thou Shalt Commit Adultery" in Philadelphia brought pastors to protest the sugar daddy billboard. The protest caused the billboard to not be renewed.

=== Sydney Leathers billboards ===
Adult film star Sydney Leathers, linked to ex-Congressman Anthony Weiner's sexting scandal, appeared in a billboard in New York City "Get a Mistress for Christmas".

== AVN Awards ==
- Arrangement Finders was nominated for 3 AVN awards for Screwing Wall Street - The Arrangement Finders IPO
- Best Parody
- Best Supporting Actress
- Best Girl/Girl Sex Scene
- The Fannys – Arrangement Finders wins for best branding
