= Nika Nesgoda =

American artist

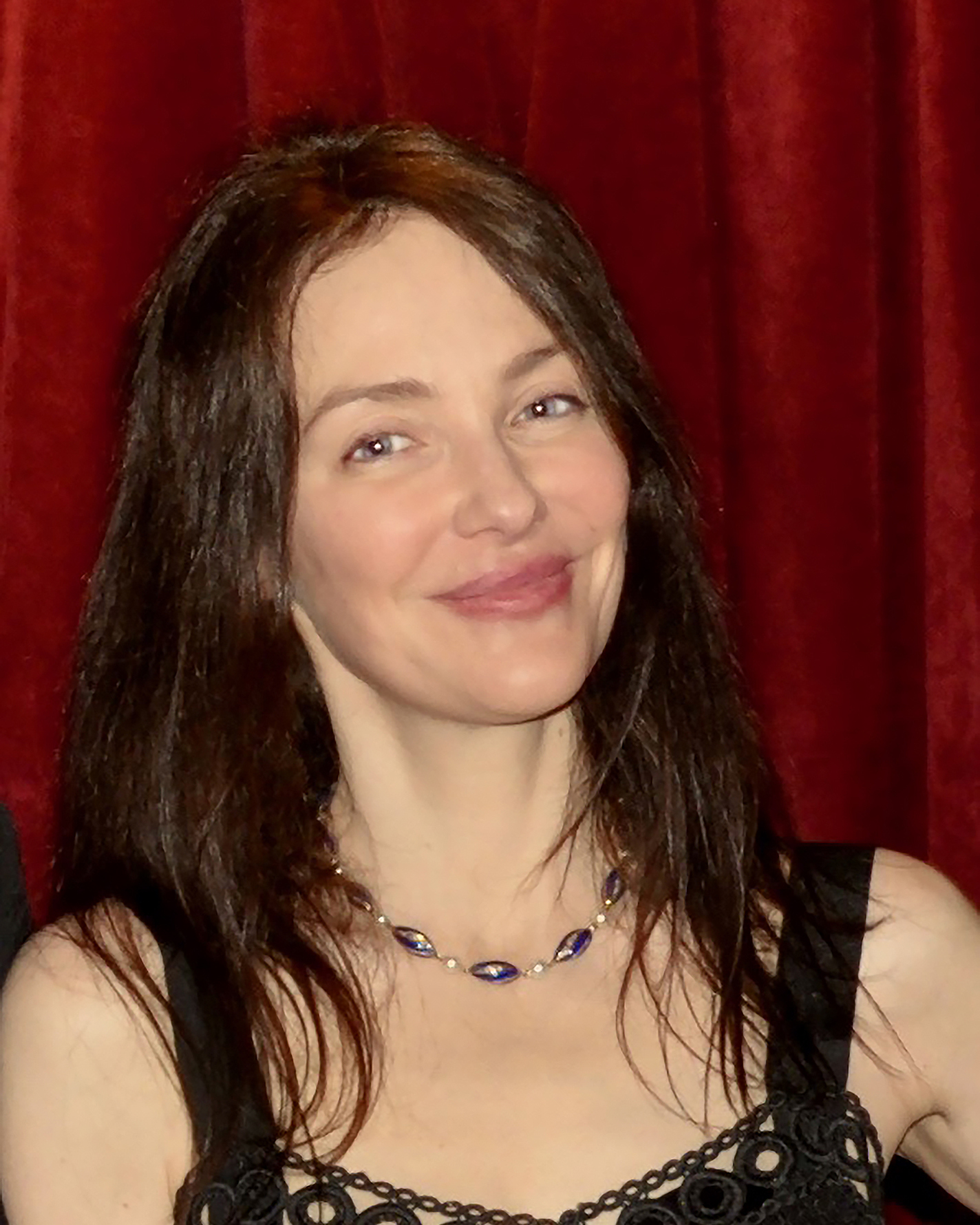
- Nika Nesgoda in Southampton, NY at Virgin reception
- Born: Duluth, MN, U.S.
- Education: Columbia University
- Known for: Photography
- Notable work: "Virgin" series 2002, "Land Scrapes" series 2018
- Spouse: William Muchnic (m. 2003)

Nika Nesgoda is an American artist and conceptual photographer.

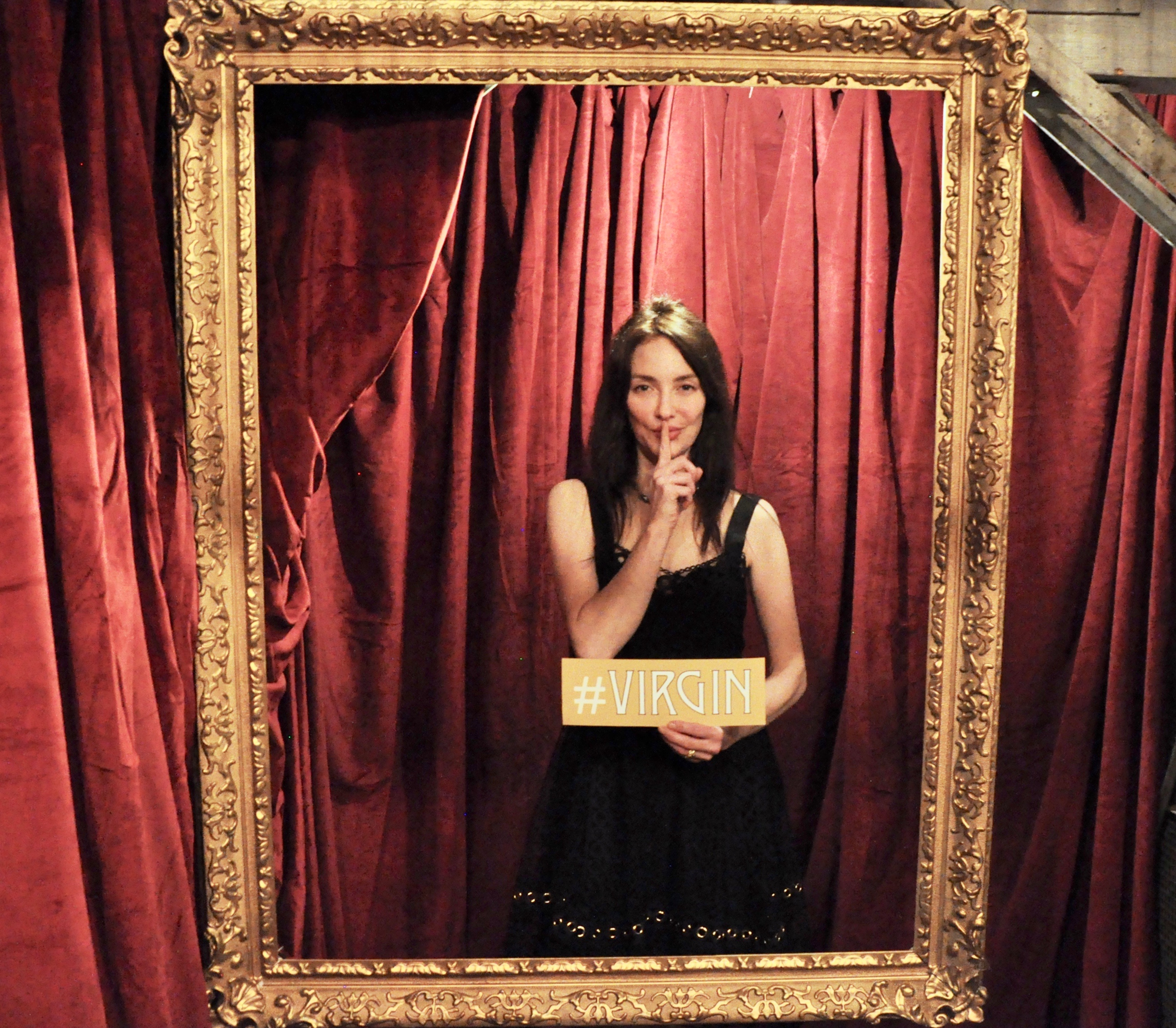
Nika Nesgoda at the art opening of Virgin in Southampton

== Virgin Series ==
In 2002, Nesgoda shot her hagiographic photographic series, VIRGIN to emulate the paintings of the Old Masters and the dichotomous use of prostitutes as artists' models, in particular Michelangelo Merisi da Caravaggio, whose painting Death of the Virgin portrayed a model who was also a sex worker. Nesgoda's series, VIRGIN, features adult film actresses to portray the Virgin Mary and references the historical use of marginalized women in religious art. In 2018, Time magazine published the series and revealed that the model in her photograph, Annuntiatio which pays homage to the 1333 Simone Martini and Lippo Memmi's Annunciation portrays the pornographic film actress Stormy Daniels as the Virgin Mary.

According to Artnet News, Nesgoda "sought to combine Christian iconography with contemporary pornography to draw attention to the fact that, from a certain perspective, both represented reductive, misogynistic views of women".

In a 2019 interview with Musée Magazine, the artist stated that "[t]he moment the idea came to me of placing adult film stars into the role of the Virgin Mary, was when I asked myself, 'who is actually worthy of being worshiped?'...Why should my choice of model bother anyone, if our highest calling as human beings is to have compassion and be inclusive?" Nesgoda said that she initially "...had Catholic guilt, so I went to speak with a Jesuit priest and a nun I knew. I asked if it was okay for me to do this. They said we are all human and everyone strays from the path, no one is without sin, and these women are worthy."

Bill Donohue of the Catholic League has publicly criticized Nesgoda's work as an affront on Catholicism. Nesgoda told Vice News that her work is meant to be a study of the role of women in church-commissioned art. "I think [critics like Donohue are] missing the point... some of the famous artists the church sought after to paint cathedrals and whatnot would bring their models – and a lot of these models were prostitutes and 'sinful women' – and the church condoned it, under the auspices of trying to convert them into good Christians".

== Other work ==
Nesgoda spent much of her earlier artistic life focused on portraiture, her current work is devoted to "landscapes in tiny objects, change, and texture. Her Landscrapes are large-format photographic images that explore the texture and nature of tiny objects through close-up photography.

== Personal life ==
Nesgoda is a graduate of Columbia University. In 2004 she took a ten-year break from art to raise her three children. She has played cello for the 1980s tribute band The Cherry Bombs. Sculpture dealer and thoroughbred breeder, Cyril Humphries, named a racehorse after the artist.
