= Cold reading (theatrical) =

Reading aloud from a script with little or no preparation

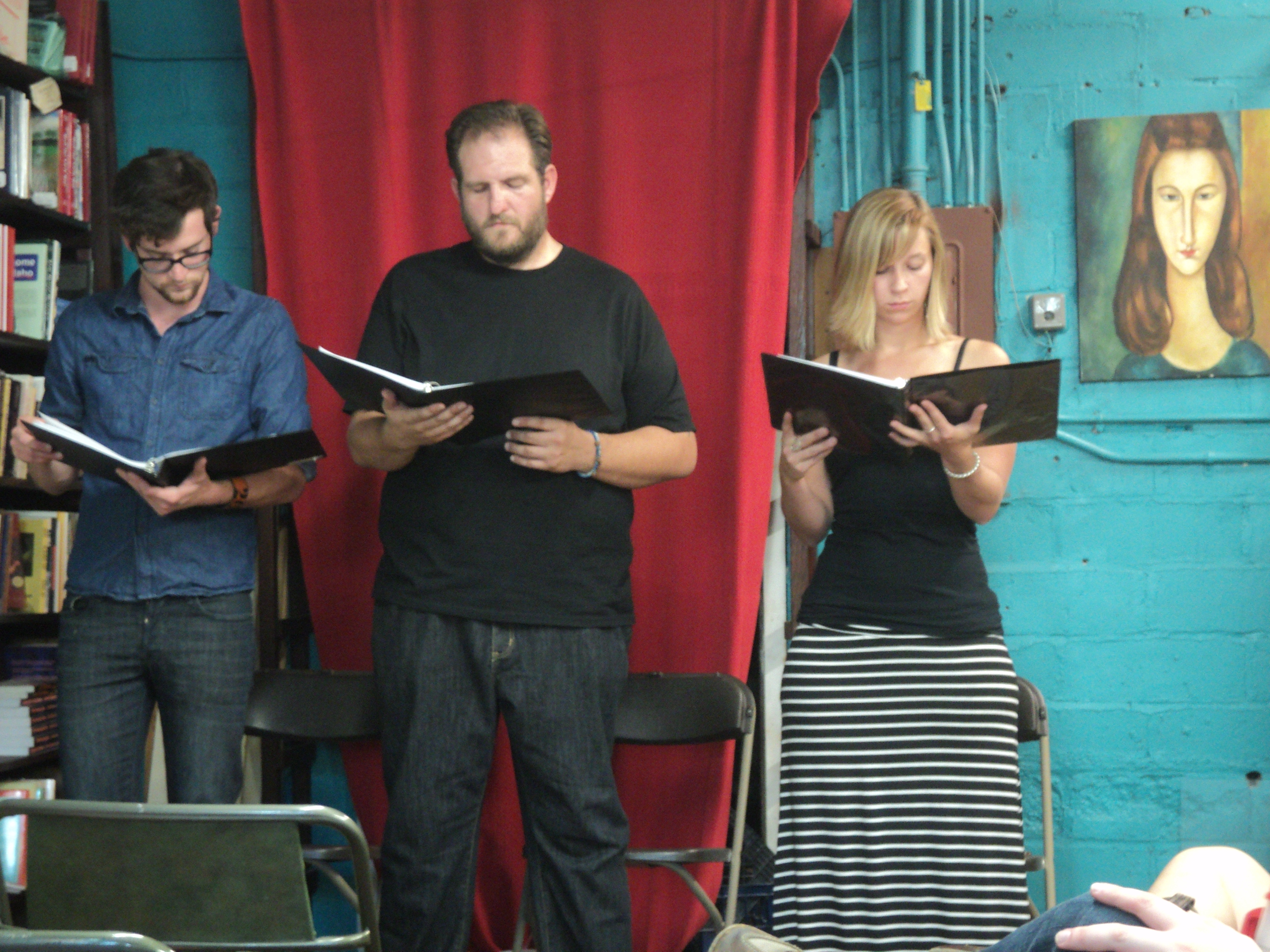
A cold reading of a play

Theatrical cold reading is reading aloud from a script or other text with little or no rehearsal, practice or study in advance. Sometimes also referred to as sight reading, it is a technique used by actors and other performers in theatre, television, and film performance fields.

Cold readings are common in performance classes, and are employed frequently in actor auditions to allow the producer or playwright to get a general idea of the actors' performing capabilities. They are also employed by playwrights who need to hear their play read aloud for the first time by actors, and as such they form an initial integral component of the collaborative creative theatrical process, which may or may not include the eventual production of the play itself. (Public performances of cold readings also serve as entertainment in their own right, particularly in the context of community theater, and less public readings can serve as creative incubators for more established playwright and theatrical talent during the course of play development.) Many actors and other performers and public speakers take classes and practice at length to improve the quality of their cold readings.

Cold reading can also be used in conjunction with improvisations to gauge a performer's ability to perform new works. A good dramatic cold reader is able to communicate with fluency and clarity and to project speech rhythms and rhymes well. The reader should also be able to bring out the intent, mood and characterization of a piece through appropriate articulation and body language.
