= List of space flight simulation games =

List of spaceflight games

This is a sourced index of commercial space flight simulation games. The list is categorized into four sections: space flight simulators, space flight simulators with an added element of combat, space combat simulators with an added element of trading, and unreleased space flight simulators.

A space flight simulator game is software that allows the operator to experience space flight with the added elements of gameplay. There are many different types of simulators. These simulators range in purpose from pure simulation to sheer entertainment. Space flight occurs beyond the Earth's atmosphere, and space flight simulators feature the ability to roll, pitch, and yaw. Space flight simulators use flight dynamics in a free environment; this free environment lets the spacecraft move within the three-dimensional coordinate system or the x, y, and z (applicate) axis.

See Lists of video games for related lists.

== Space flight simulation games ==
| Title | Release year | Developer | Publisher | Platform | Notes | Ref. |
|---|---|---|---|---|---|---|
| Artemis: Spaceship Bridge Simulator | 2010 | Thom Robertson | Thom Robertson | Windows, Android, iOS, WINE | Multiplayer co-operative spaceship bridge simulator. | |
| Astroneer | 2016 | System Era Softworks | System Era Softworks | Windows, Xbox One, PlayStation 4, Nintendo Switch (January 2022) | Outer space mining resources on planets. | |
| Dreadnought | 2016 | Yager Development | Grey Box | Windows | | |
| Eagle Lander 3D | 2010 | Ron Monsen | Ron Monsen | Windows | There are another two versions, in 2D and for VR. | |
| Hellion | 2017 | ZeroGravity Games | | Windows | Survival with PvP and PvE elements. | |
| Iron Sky: Invasion | 2012 | Reality Pump | TopWare Interactive | Windows, Xbox 360, PlayStation 3, iOS, Android, Mac OS | Official video game expansion of the 2012 sci-fi film "Iron Sky". Combines space combat simulation with strategy and RPG elements. | |
| Kerbal Space Program | 2011 (Early Access, 1.0 released in 2015) | Squad | Private Division | Windows, Mac OS X, Linux, Xbox One | Features Newtonian physics and patched conic approximation for orbits. It has received critical acclaim and many mods. | |
| Kinetic Void | 2014 | Badland Studio | Valve | Microsoft Windows, Mac OS and Linux | | |
| Microsoft Space Simulator | 1994 | Bruce Artwick Organization Ltd. | Microsoft | DOS | | |
| Spaceflight Simulator (SFS) | 2017 | Team Curiosity. | Private (iOS and Android), Steam (Windows Version) | Windows, MacOS, Android, iOS | 2D sandbox spaceflight simulator. Available on both PC and mobile. | https://teamcuriosity.com/ |
| Noctis | 2000 | Alessandro Ghignola | Alessandro Ghignola | Windows, DOS | Occurs in an imaginary universe with futuristic/fictional aspects such as planetary landings and sentient aliens; no weapons or combat. | |
| Orbiter | 2000 | Martin Schweiger | Martin Schweiger | Windows | Accurately simulates the physics and it is moddable. Released as freeware. Current release August 2016 | |
| Project Space Station | 1985 | HESware | HESware | Commodore 64, Apple II, DOS | Four-part gameplay: administration of a space station program; shuttle launches, using a highly abstracted navigation system; assembling space station parts using an EVA pod; and shuttle landings using a 2D representation. | |
| Reentry - An Orbital Simulator | 2018 | Wilhelmsen Studios | Wilhelmsen Studios | Microsoft Windows | Simulates launch, flight, and reentry for the Project Mercury, Project Gemini, and Apollo program spacecraft | |
| Rendezvous: A Space Shuttle Simulation | 1982 | Wes Huntress | Edu-Ware Services | Apple II | Simulates shuttle launch, rendezvous with space station, and docking. | |
| Rise: The Vieneo Province | 2006 | Jason Reskin | Unistellar Industries, LLC | Microsoft Windows | Simulates futuristic VTOL vehicles, space stations, reentry. | |
| Shuttle: the Space Flight Simulator | 1992 | Vektor Grafix | Virgin Interactive | DOS, Amiga, Atari ST | | |
| Space Shuttle: A Journey into Space | 1983 | Jessica Stevens (Note: Then credited as Steve Kitchen.) | Activision | Amstrad CPC, Atari 2600, Atari 5200, Atari 8-bit, Commodore 64, MSX, ZX Spectrum | | |
| Space Shuttle Mission 2007 | 2008 | Exciting Simulations | Simsquared Ltd. | Windows | | |
| Juno: New Origins | 2023 | Jundroo | Jundroo | Windows, MacOS, Android, iOS | 3D aerospace sandbox where players can use customizable parts to construct and test rockets, planes, cars, or anything they can imagine in an environment with realistic physics across land, sea, air, and space. It entered early access on Steam with the name Simplerockets 2 in 2018. | |
| Astra Protocol 2 | 2022 | Slice Bar | Slice Bar | Windows | Retrofuturism inspired survival game with text-based commands | |
| Flight of Nova | 2022 | Aerovery Lab | Aerovery Lab | Windows, Linux | Based on Newtonian physics and real life orbital dynamics | |
| Kerbal Space Program 2 | 2023 | Private Division, Intercept Games | Intercept Games | Windows, Xbox, PlayStation | Sequel to the critically acclaimed game Kerbal Space Program. Development ceased while still in Early-Access. | |
| Historic Landings | 2024 | Burak Alparslan Kaya | Burak Alparslan Kaya | Android | Arcade style moon landing game where players aim for the highest possible score with different landers. | |
| Approximately Up | 2026 | Approximately Games | Approximately Games | Steam | A low-level sandbox spaceship builder and simulator with blocky graphics and interplanetary travel. | https://approximatelyup.com/ |

=== Space flight simulation games under development ===
| Title | Release year | Developer | Publisher | Platform | Notes | Ref. |
|---|---|---|---|---|---|---|
| Star Citizen | TBA | Cloud Imperium Games | Cloud Imperium Games | Windows | MMO Space trading and combat, first-person shooter, Immersive sim | Star Citizen |
| Age of Ascent 2 | TBA | Illyriad Games | Illyriad Games | Multiplatform, Windows, Macintosh | Space MMO with real-time dog fighting. | |

| Title | Release year | Developer | Publisher | Platform | Notes | Ref. |
|---|---|---|---|---|---|---|
| Spaceflight Simulator 2 (SFS 2) | TBA | Team Curiosity | Team Curiosity | Steam, IOS, Android | 3D sequel to the Spaceflight Simulator game. A reveal trailer has been released by the developers, and the release was expected in Early 2025, current release date unknown. | https://teamcuriosity.com/ |
| Kitten Space Agency | 2025 (Alpha) | RocketWerkz | RocketWerkz | Download / Torrent on PC | Spiritual successor to Kerbal Space Program, using a custom framework. Will not be released on steam, instead using a "torrent client" and downloads. The first public release was on November 14th 2025. | |

=== Cancelled space flight simulation and space combat games ===
| Title | Release year | Developer | Publisher | Platform | Notes | Ref. |
|---|---|---|---|---|---|---|
| Babylon 5: Into the Fire | N/A | Yosemite Entertainment | Sierra | Windows | Combat Simulator | |
| Jumpgate Evolution | N/A | NetDevil | Codemasters | Windows | MMORPG | |

== Space combat games ==
| Title | Release year | Developer | Publisher | Platform | Notes | Ref. |
|---|---|---|---|---|---|---|
| 3D Star Racer | 1994 | BlazeDev | ClickGamer | Windows Mobile | FMV-style simulator | |
| Absolute Zero | 1995 | Domark | Domark | MS-DOS, Mac | | |
| Acamar Rising | 2005 | Beteo Software and Games | Beteo Software and Games | Windows | | |
| Ace of Angels | 2002 | Flying Rock Enterprises | Flying Rock Enterprises | Windows | | |
| Aces of the Galaxy | 2008 | Artech Digital Entertainment | Sierra Entertainment | Windows, Xbox 360 Live | | |
| Allegiance | 2000 | Microsoft | Microsoft | Windows | Official servers shut down in 2002; as of 2012, developed and maintained by volunteers and free to download from their official site. | |
| Ambush | 1983 | Nippon Amuse Co. Ltd | Nippon Amuse Co. Ltd. | Arcade | | |
| Anthelion: The Galactic Alliance | 2003 | PDAmill | PDAmill | Windows Mobile | | |
| Anthelion 2: Celestial Vigilance | 2006 | PDAmill | PDAmill | Windows Mobile | | |
| AquaNox | 2001 | Massive Development | Fishtank Interactive | Windows | Sequel to Archimedean Dynasty but abandons much of the trading and privateering for which its predecessor was famous; reviews state the feel is that of a space combat sim | |
| AquaNox 2: Revelation | 2003 | Massive Development | Encore Software, Inc., JoWooD Productions | Windows | As noted many places, the addition of lasers in an underwater submarine battle makes the look and feel of the game that of a space combat sim | |
| Ares Rising | 1998 | Imagine Studios | Imagine Studios | Windows | | |
| Argon 3D | 2006 | Mediaplazza | Clickgamer | Java ME | | |
| Arvoch Alliance | 2011 | StarWraith 3D Games | StarWraith 3D Games | Windows | | |
| Astron Belt | 1983 | Sega | Sega | Arcade | Considered the first laserdisc video game | |
| A/X-101 | 1994 | Absolute Entertainment, Micronet | Sega | Sega CD | FMV-style simulator | |
| Backlash: A Turret Gunner Simulation | 1995 | Sanctuary Software Studio | Sanctuary Software Studio | DOS | Also known as Backlash: Assault on Omicron Station | |
| Babylon 5: I've Found Her | 2004 | Space Dream Factory | Space Dream Factory | Windows, Mac OS X, Linux | Freeware; uses its own game engine; set in the universe of Babylon 5 | |
| The Babylon Project | 2004 | The Babylon Project | The Babylon Project | Windows | Freeware mod to Volition's FreeSpace 2 | |
| Bang! Gunship Elite | 2000 | RayLand | Red Storm Entertainment | Dreamcast, Windows | | |
| BattleSphere | 2000 | 4Play/ScatoLogic | 4Play/ScatoLogic | Jaguar | First video game with a 32-player network ability; one of the most rare and expensive games to find | |
| Battlestar Galactica | 2003 | Warthog | Vivendi Universal Games | Xbox, PlayStation 2 | | |
| Battlestar Galactica: Beyond the Red Line | 2007 | Beyond the Red Line team | Beyond the Red Line team | Windows, Linux, Mac OS X | Freeware mod to FreeSpace Open; in February 2008, it won Mod DB's Mod of the Year Award for Best Indie Game | |
| Battlestar Galactica Online | 2011 | Bigpoint, Artplant | Bigpoint | Windows, Mac OS X | Browser based MMO | |
| Battlezone | 1998 | Activision | Activision | Windows, Nintendo 64 | First-person RTS/Tank Commander. Expansion "The Red Odyssey" – requires original game. | |
| Black Prophecy | 2011 | Reakktor Media GMBH | Reakktor Media GMBH | Windows | MMORPG with a maximum number of players on each server limited to 300 | |
| Blast Radius | 1999 | Pitbull Syndicate | Psygnosis | PlayStation | | |
| Cellblock Squadrons | 2005 | Super Furious Software | Super Furious Software | Windows | | |
| Chorus | 2021 | Fishlabs | Deep Silver | Microsoft Windows, Xbox Series X/S, Xbox One, PlayStation 5, PlayStation 4, Stadia, Luna | | |
| Codename MAT | 1984 | Derek Brewster | Micromega | ZX Spectrum, Amstrad CPC | sub-system damage and repair simulation. | |
| Colony Wars | 1997 | Psygnosis | Psygnosis | PlayStation | | |
| Colony Wars: Vengeance | 1998 | Psygnosis | Psygnosis | PlayStation | | |
| Colony Wars: Red Sun | 2000 | Psygnosis | Psygnosis | PlayStation | | |
| Cosmic Conflict | 1978 | Magnavox | Magnavox | Magnavox Odyssey | | |
| Creature Shock | 1994 | Argonaut Games | Virgin Interactive | PC, 3DO, PlayStation, Sega Saturn, CD-i | Parts of this FMV game include space combat; these parts are omitted from the PlayStation, Saturn, and CD-i versions | |
| Darklight Conflict | 1997 | Rage Software | Electronic Arts | Windows | | |
| DarkSpace | 2000–2014 | Palestar | Palestar Inc | Windows | | |
| DarkStar One | 2006 | Ascaron | cdv Software Entertainment AG | Windows, Xbox 360 | | |
| Darxide EMP | 2003 | Frontier Developments | Frontier Developments | Windows Mobile, Symbian, Sega 32X, Windows | | |
| Death Star | 1970s | Gene Ball | University of Rochester | Xerox Alto | Described in 1982 as "you pilot your Alto down a trench in the Death Star and fire a torpedo in its only vulnerable spot to save the Federation ... No still photograph can describe the fine graphic detail". | |
| Deep Space Attack | 2003 | Pimap | ClickGamer | Java ME | | |
| Descent: FreeSpace – The Great War | 1998 | Volition | Interplay | Windows, Amiga | | |
| Destination Earthstar | 1990 | Imagineering | Acclaim | Nintendo Entertainment System | | |
| Destiny | 2006 | Black Bull Studios | ClickGamer | Symbian | | |
| Diaspora: Shattered Armistice | 2012 | Diaspora Development team | Diaspora Development team | Windows, Linux, Mac OS X | Freeware game based on FreeSpace Open set in the reimagined Battlestar Galactica universe | |
| Drift: When Worlds Collide | 2002 | Redward Studios | Cosmi Corporation | Windows | | |
| Endless Space 2 | 2017 | AMPLITUDE Studios | Sega | Windows, Mac OS X | Endless Space 2 is a strategic space opera set in a mysterious universe. Your story unfolds in a galaxy that was first colonized by God-like beings known as the "Endless", who rose and fell eons ago. All that remains of them are mystical ruins, powerful artifacts, and a strange, near-magical substance known as Dust. | |
| Epic | 1992 | Digital Image Design | Ocean Software | Amiga, Atari ST, MS-DOS, NEC PC-9801 | | |
| Everspace | 2017 | Rockfish Games | Rockfish Games | Microsoft Windows, macOS, Linux, PlayStation 4, Xbox One, Nintendo Switch | Single-player 3D space shooter with rogue-like elements and non-linear storytelling. | |
| Eve: Valkyrie | 2016 | CCP Games | CCP Games | Windows, PlayStation 4 | Uses virtual reality headsets | |
| FreeSpace 2 | 1999 | Volition | Interplay | Windows, FS2 SCP was also ported to Linux and Mac OS X | In 2002, Volition released the source code for the game engine which is under development as FreeSpace 2 Source Code Project; FS2 SCP is the base to many user created mods | |
| FreeSpace Port | 2003 | GalacticEmperor | Hard Light Productions | Windows, Linux, Mac OS X | Allows users to play full campaign of original FreeSpace and Silent Threat using updated graphics engine from FreeSpace 2 Source Code Project | |
| Forced Alliance | 1997 | Ripcord Games | Orbital Studios | Windows | | |
| FurtherTime | 2004 | Maxim Vorsobine | Maxim Vorsobine | Windows | | |
| Galactic Command- Echo Squad: Rise Of The Insurgents | 2008 | 3000AD | GameTap | Windows | Also, Echo Squad SE | |
| Galactic Federation | 2004 | Radivoj Radivojevic | AM-Games | Windows | | |
| Galactic Gunner | 2009 | Ezone.com | iTunes Store | iOS | Rail shooter style combat | |
| Galactic Realms | 2004 | Crimson Fire Entertainment | Crimson Fire Entertainment | Windows | | |
| Hellhog XP | 2003 | StateVector Games | StateVector Games | Windows | | |
| HomePlanet | 2003 | Revolt Games | 3Map Games | Windows | | |
| Homeplanet: Play with Fire | 2004 | Revolt Games | 3Map Games | Windows | Expansion to original game, installing the expansion adds multiplayer support to the game | |
| House of the Dying Sun | 2016 | Marauder Interactive | Marauder Interactive | Windows | | |
| Inca | 1993 | Coktel Vision | Sierra Entertainment | Windows | Contains a Myst-like FMV graphic adventure game | |
| Inca II: Nations of Immortality | 1993 | Coktel Vision | Sierra Entertainment | Windows | Also called Inca II: Wiracocha; contains a Myst-like FMV graphic adventure game | |
| Inca I & II (Collector's Edition) | 1995 | Coktel Vision | Sierra Entertainment | Windows | | |
| Incoming: The Final Conflict | 1998 | Rage Software | InterplayUS, ImagineerJP | Dreamcast, Windows | | |
| Incoming Forces | 2003 | Rage Software | Interplay | Windows | | |
| Inferno | 1994 | Digital Image Design | Ocean Software | MS-DOS | Sequel to Epic | |
| Interstellar Flames | 2002 | Xen Games, Eon Games | Xen Games | Windows Mobile, Linux, Palm OS, Symbian | | |
| Independence War | 1997 | Particle Systems | Infogrames | Windows | Released in Europe as I-War | |
| Independence War – Deluxe Edition | 1998 | Particle Systems | Infogrames | Windows | Released in Europe as I-War Special Edition this installment has the Defiance Expansion Pack; the expansion pack was never released alone | |
| Independence War 2: Edge of Chaos | 2001 | Particle Systems | Infogrames Entertainment SA | Windows | | |
| Lander | 1999 | Psygnosis | Psygnosis | Windows | Included single and multi-player gameplay; released as a "Special Edition Pack" which included both CD-ROM and DVD-ROM versions; DVD version included added video cut scenes between missions | |
| Leo's Space Combat Simulator | 2007 | Leopoldo Bueno Castillo | Leopoldo Bueno Castillo | Windows Mobile | This game is freeware | |
| The Last Dynasty | 1995 | Coktel Vision | Sierra Entertainment | Windows | Contains a Myst-like FMV graphic adventure game that occurs aboard a giant space station | |
| Lunar Rescue | 1979 | Taito | Taito | Arcade | | |
| Mace Griffin: Bounty Hunter | 2004 | Warthog | Vivendi Universal Games | Xbox, PlayStation 2, Windows | Mixed genre game: 80% is first-person shooter, 20% is space combat | |
| Mercenary series | 1985 | Novagen Software | Novagen Software | Atari 8-bit, Commodore 64, ZX Spectrum, Amstrad CPC, Atari ST, Amiga, Commodore 16/116/Plus/4 | 3D open world action-adventure. The second and third parts of the series involved interplanetary travel within a solar system. | |
| Metalion | 2002 | ZIO Interactive | ZIO Interactive | Windows Mobile | | |
| Metalion 2: Mutant Uprising | 2003 | ZIO Interactive | ZIO Interactive | Windows Mobile | | |
| Mobile Suit Gundam: Last Shooting | 1984 | | Bandai | MSX | | |
| Mobile Suit Z-Gundam: Hot Scramble | 1986 | Game Studio | Bandai | NES | | |
| N-Space | 2005 | Monkey Business | Nokia SNAP Mobile | Java ME | One of the few MMOG space combat sim games for mobile phones | |
| Nexus: The Jupiter Incident | 2004 | Mithis Entertainment | Vivendi Universal / HD Interactive | Windows | Focuses on tactics and ship management instead of resource collection and base construction. Previously "Imperium Galactica 3". | |
| Nihilist | 1996 | Bits Corporation | Philips | Windows | | |
| Phoenix | 1999 | Team17 | Titus Interactive | Windows | Has a dynamic campaign structure | |
| Phoenix 3 | 1995 | Gray Matter Inc. | Studio 3DO | 3DO | Combination of Flashback/Another World platforming with Wing Commander-esque flight sequences | |
| No Gravity | 1998 | realtech VR | Titus Interactive | Windows, Linux, Mac OS, Amiga OS, BeOS, PSP | Is also named Space Girl; released as freeware | |
| No Gravity: The Plague of Mind | 2008 | realtech VR | PlayStation Store, iTunes App Store | PSP, iOS | Sequel to No Gravity produced 10 years after original title | |
| Open Galaxy | 2023 | MichaelEGA | indieDB | Windows | Freeware made with the Unity Engine | |
| Project Sylpheed | 2006 | Game Arts, SETA Corporation | Microsoft, Square Enix | Xbox 360 | | |
| Psi-5 Trading Company | 1985 | Distinctive Software | Accolade | Amstrad CPC, MS-DOS, Commodore 64, Apple II, ZX Spectrum | | |
| Romanians in Space | 2007 | 2 Bad Design | 2 Bad Design | Windows | Incited controversy in Hungary as it depicts the Romanians having conquered the Earth now beginning to conquer the galaxy; full version released as freeware | |
| Shattered Horizon | 2009 | Futuremark Games Studio | Futuremark Corporation, Steam | Windows | First-person shooter set in zero gravity | |
| Shattered Worlds – Space Combat | 2003 | Skwork Studios | Astraware | Windows Mobile, Palm OS | | |
| Shattered Worlds – Planet Assault | 2004 | Skwork Studio | Astraware | Windows Mobile, Palm OS | | |
| Shadow Squadron | 1995 | Sega | Sega | Sega 32X | | |
| Shockwave Assault | 1994 | Dice | Electronic Arts | 3DO, Saturn, PlayStation, Mac OS, Windows | FMV style simulator, released on the 3DO as simply Shockwave | |
| Shockwave: Operation Jumpgate | 1995 | Dice | Electronic Arts | 3DO, PlayStation | FMV style simulator expansion pack, included as a bonus in most versions of Shockwave Assault | |
| Shockwave 2: Beyond The Gate | 1997 | Dice | Electronic Arts | Saturn, PlayStation, Mac OS, Windows, 3DO | FMV style simulator | |
| Silent Threat: Reborn | 2008 | GalacticEmperor & Goober5000 | Hard Light Productions | Windows, Linux, Mac OS X | 18 missions based on the original Silent Threat, 8 of the missions are original; all are made possible using the updated graphics engine from FreeSpace 2 Source Code Project | |
| Skyfox II: The Cygnus Conflict | 1987 | Dynamix, Inc. | Electronic Arts | MS-DOS, Amiga, Atari ST, Commodore 64 | Set in space, may be viewed as a mix of space sim and first-person shooter | |
| Solar Eclipse | 1995 | Crystal Dynamics | Crystal Dynamics | Saturn, 3DO | FMV style simulator | |
| Solar Winds: The Escape | 1993 | Stone Interactive Media | Epic MegaGames | DOS | Chapter 1 shareware version | |
| Solar Winds: Galaxy | 1993 | Stone Interactive Media | Epic MegaGames | DOS | Chapter 2 | |
| SOL: Exodus | 2012 | Seamless Entertainment | Seamless Entertainment | Windows | | |
| Space Encounters | 1980 | Namco | Namco | Arcade | | |
| Space Seeker | 1981 | Taito | Taito | Arcade | | |
| Space Tactics | 1980 | Sega | Sega | Arcade | | |
| Star Assault | 2007 | Kalypso | GamesArk | Windows | | |
| StarBlade | 1991 | Namco | Namco | Arcade, Sega CD, 3DO, PlayStation | Early full 3D polygonal game | |
| Star Conflict | 2012 | StarGem Inc | Gaijin Entertainment | Windows, Macintosh, Linux | Free to play 3D arcade space-shooter, MMO elements. | |
| Star Cruiser | 1988 | Arsys Software | Arsys Software | NEC PC-8801, X68000, Mega Drive | Early full 3D polygonal game | |
| Star Crusader | 1994 | Take-Two Interactive | Take-Two Publishing | Amiga, CD32, MS-DOS | | |
| Star Fighter | 1994 | Fednet Krisalis | Acclaim Entertainment | Acorn Archimedes, 3DO, Saturn, Windows, PlayStation | Released in 1996 for the 3DO and the Sega Saturn under the slightly changed name Star Fighter 3000 | |
| Star Luster | 1985 | Namco | Namco | Nintendo Famicom, Nintendo Vs. Arcade | | |
| StarMade | 2013 | Schema | Schema | Windows, Macintosh, Linux | Freeware. Currently in Alpha. Voxel based, spaceship building game. | |
| Star Quest I: In the 27th Century | 1995 | Paul Lauzon | Virtual Adventures Inc. | MS-DOS | 3D space combat, exploration and race Simulator | |
| Star Raiders | 1979 | Atari, Inc. | Atari | Atari 8-bit | | |
| Star Rangers | 1995 | Interactive Magic | Interactive Magic | Windows | | |
| Star Trek | 1982 | Sega | Sega | Arcade | One of the most elaborate vector graphics games ever released | |
| Star Trek: Invasion | 2000 | Warthog | Activision | PlayStation | | |
| Star Trek: Klingon Academy | 2000 | 14 Degrees East | Interplay | Windows | | |
| Star Trek: Shattered Universe | 2004 | Starsphere Interactive | TDK Mediactive | Xbox, PlayStation 2 | | |
| Star Trek: Starfleet Academy | 1994 | High Voltage Software | Interplay | Windows, Super NES, Mega Drive, Mac OS | | |
| Star Trek: Tactical Assault | 2006 | Quicksilver Software | Bethesda Softworks | Nintendo DS, PSP | | |
| Star Trek: The Next Generation: Advanced Holodeck Tutorial | 1994 | Imagineering | Absolute Entertainment | Nintendo Entertainment System, Game Boy, Game Gear | | |
| Star Voyager | 1986 | ASCII Entertainment | Acclaim | Nintendo Entertainment System | Released in Japan as Cosmo Genesis | |
| Star Wars | 1983 | Atari, Inc. | Atari, Inc. | Arcade, Acorn Electron, Amiga, Atari 2600, Atari 5200, Atari 8-bit, Atari ST, Apple II, Mac, BBC Micro, Commodore 64, ColecoVision, DOS, ZX Spectrum | | |
| Star Wars: Arcade | 1993 | Sega | LucasArts | Arcade, Sega 32X | | |
| Star Wars: The Empire Strikes Back | 1985 | Atari Games | Atari Games | Arcade | | |
| Star Wars: Trilogy Arcade | 1998 | AM3 | LucasArts | Arcade | | |
| Star Wars: Battle for Naboo | 2001 | Factor 5 | LucasArts | Nintendo 64, Windows | | |
| Star Wars: Battlefront | 2004 | Pandemic Studios | LucasArts | Windows, PlayStation 2, Xbox, Mac OS X, mobile phone, PSP | | |
| Star Wars: Battlefront II | 2005 | Pandemic Studios | LucasArts | Windows, PlayStation 2, Xbox, PSP | | |
| Star Wars Battlefront: Elite Squadron | 2009 | Rebellion Developments (PSP), N-Space (DS) | LucasArts | Nintendo DS, PSP | | |
| Star Wars: Rebel Assault | 1993 | LucasArts | LucasArts | DOS (Windows re-release), Sega CD, Macintosh, 3DO | FMV style simulator | |
| Star Wars: Rebel Assault II: The Hidden Empire | 1995 | LucasArts | LucasArts | DOS, Windows, Sega CD, Macintosh, PlayStation | FMV style simulator | |
| Star Wars: Rogue Squadron | 1998 | Factor 5 | LucasArts | Windows, Nintendo 64 | | |
| Star Wars: Rogue Squadron II: Rogue Leader | 2001 | Factor 5 | LucasArts | GameCube | | |
| Star Wars: Rogue Squadron III: Rebel Strike | 2003 | Factor 5 | LucasArts | GameCube | | |
| Star Wars: Starfighter | 2001 | LucasArts | LucasArts | PlayStation 2, Xbox, Windows | | |
| Star Wars: Jedi Starfighter | 2002 | LucasArts | LucasArts | PlayStation 2, Xbox | Sequel to 2001 Starfighter | |
| Star Wars: TIE Fighter | 1994 | Totally Games | LucasArts | DOS, Windows, Mac OS | | |
| Star Wars: TIE Fighter – Defender of the Empire | 1995 | Totally Games | LucasArts | DOS, Mac OS | Expansion pack for the original TIE Fighter | |
| Star Wars: TIE Fighter (Collector's CD-ROM Edition) | 1995 | Totally Games | LucasArts | DOS, Windows, Mac OS | TIE Fighter plus the expansion pack and improved features | |
| Star Wars: X-Wing | 1993 | Totally Games | LucasArts | DOS, Macintosh | | |
| Star Wars: X-Wing – Imperial Pursuit | 1993 | Totally Games | LucasArts | DOS, Macintosh | Expansion pack for the original X-Wing | |
| Star Wars: X-Wing – B-Wing | 1993 | Totally Games | LucasArts | DOS, Mac OS | Expansion pack for the original X-Wing | |
| Star Wars: X-Wing (Collector's CD-ROM Edition) | 1994 | Totally Games | LucasArts | DOS, Windows, Mac OS | Includes both expansion packs and improved features | |
| Star Wars: X-Wing Collector Series Edition | 1998 | Totally Games | LucasArts | Windows | Includes both X-Wing, and TIE Fighter games with all expansion packs from both games, plus a flight training school add-on; integrated in this game is the X-Wing vs. TIE Fighter 3d accelerated engine | |
| Star Wars: X-Wing Trilogy | 2000 | Totally Games | LucasArts | Windows | | |
| Star Wars: X-Wing Trilogy Arcade | 1998 | AM3 | LucasArts | Arcade | Rail shooter style combat | |
| Star Wars: X-Wing Alliance | 1999 | Totally Games | LucasArts | Windows | | |
| Star Wars: X-Wing vs. TIE Fighter | 1997 | Totally Games | LucasArts | Windows | | |
| Star Wars: Squadrons | 2020 | Motive Studios | Electronic Arts | Windows, PlayStation 4, Xbox One | | |
| SpaceCombat | 2008 | Cilcoder | Xbox Live | Xbox 360 | Very basic cartoon styled space combat game | |
| Space Combat | 2008 | MyRealGames.com | MyRealGames.com | Windows | Freeware | |
| Space Interceptor: Project Freedom | 2004 | Merscom | City Interactive | Windows | | |
| Space Rebellion | 2004 | Phoenix Games | Phoenix Games | PlayStation 2 | Released for PlayStation 2 only; a Windows game with the same name was published by Grabituk.com, but it is not a space flight simulator | |
| Starglider | 1986 | Argonaut Games | Rainbird Software | Amiga, Amstrad CPC, Apple II, Atari ST, Commodore 64, ZX Spectrum | | |
| Starship 1 | 1977 | Atari | Atari | Arcade | | |
| Starship Command | 1983 | Peter Irvin | Acornsoft | Acorn Electron, BBC Micro | | |
| Starlancer | 2000 | Digital Anvil | Microsoft | Windows, Dreamcast | | |
| Starlink: Battle for Atlas | 2018 | Ubisoft Toronto | Ubisoft | Nintendo Switch, PlayStation 4, Windows, Xbox One | | |
| Starmaster | 1982 | Activision | Activision | Atari 2600 | | |
| Starshatter | 2004 | Destroyer Studios | Matrix Games | Windows | | |
| Starshatter: The Gathering Storm | 2006 | Destroyer Studios | Matrix Games | Windows | | |
| Starship Conquer | 2004 | Michael Molkenthin | Enjoy Soft | Windows | | |
| Star Wraith | 1999 | StarWraith 3D Games | StarWraith 3D Games | Windows | Released as freeware | |
| Star Wraith II | 2000 | StarWraith 3D Games | StarWraith 3D Games | Windows | Released as freeware | |
| Star Wraith III: Shadows of Orion | 2000 | StarWraith 3D Games | StarWraith 3D Games | Windows | Released as freeware | |
| Star Wraith IV: Reviction | 2002 | StarWraith 3D Games | StarWraith 3D Games | Windows | Released as freeware | |
| Strike Suit Zero | 2013 | Born Ready Games | Born Ready Games | Windows, Mac OS, Linux, Nintendo Switch | | |
| Sublevel Zero | 2015 | Sigtrap Games | Sigtrap Games | Windows, Mac OS, SteamOS | Features 6-DOF gameplay across procedurally-generated levels | |
| SubSpace | 1997 | Burst Studios | Virgin Interactive | Windows | | |
| Tac/Scan | 1982 | Sega | Sega | Arcade | | |
| Tarr Chronicles | 2007 | Quazar Studio | Akella, cdv Software Entertainment, Paradox Interactive | Windows | Russian name was Tarr Chronicles: Ghosts of Stars, English release removed words from name | |
| Dark Horizon | 2008 | Quazar Studio | Akella, Paradox Interactive | Windows | Prequel to Akella's Tarr Chronicles: Ghosts of Stars and set 100 years prior, introduces a new race, new control modes, more advanced ship modification; Russian release is named Tarr Chronicles: Guards of the Frontier, English release is named Dark Horizon | |
| The Earth Dies Screaming | 1983 | Sirius Software | 20th Century Fox | Atari 2600 | Also was released for VIC-20 and Atari 8-bit under the name Final Orbit | |
| The Tomorrow War | 2009 | CrioLand | 1C, 505 Games | Windows | Space sim based on a trilogy of novels written by a famous Russian author, Alexander Zorich; game was originally released in Russia in 2006, however the new release suffered from a poor English translation | |
| Virtual Impact | 2003 | Erik Koenig | VirtualImpactGames | Windows | Described as space combat sim plus sports match | |
| Void Destroyer | 2015 | Paul Zakrzewski | Paul Zakrzewski | Windows | RTS/sim hybrid. Pilot a single ship in first-person combat, or control the entire fleet using the mouse. | |
| WarpSpeed | 1993 | Accolade | Accolade | Sega Mega Drive | | |
| Wing Commander | 1990 | Origin Systems | Origin Systems | DOS, Amiga, Sega CD, Super NES, 3DO | | |
| Wing Commander: The Secret Missions | 1990 | Origin Systems | Origin Systems | DOS, Amiga, Super NES | Expansion pack for the original Wing Commander | |
| Wing Commander: The Secret Missions 2: Crusade | 1991 | Origin Systems | Origin Systems | DOS, Amiga | Expansion pack for the original Wing Commander | |
| Super Wing Commander | 1994 | Origin Systems | Origin Systems | 3DO, Macintosh | Contained Secret Missions, and special third campaign was also created between the two expansions | |
| Wing Commander II: Vengeance of the Kilrathi | 1991 | Origin Systems | Origin Systems | DOS | | |
| Wing Commander III: Heart of the Tiger | 1994 | Origin Systems | Origin Systems | DOS, 3DO, PlayStation, Macintosh | | |
| Wing Commander: The Kilrathi Saga | 1996 | Origin Systems | Origin Systems | Windows | Recompilation of the first three Wing Commander games; expansion packs must be downloaded separately as they were not shipped on the CD but were made available online for free | |
| Wing Commander IV: The Price of Freedom | 1996 | Origin Systems | Electronic Arts | DOS, Windows, PlayStation, Macintosh | | |
| Wing Commander: Prophecy | 1997 | Origin Systems | Electronic Arts | Windows, GBA | | |
| Wing Commander: Secret Ops | 1998 | Origin Systems | Electronic Arts | Windows | Expansion pack for the original Wing Commander: Prophecy | |
| Wing Commander: Prophecy Gold | 1999 | Origin Systems | Electronic Arts | Windows | Contains the original Wing Commander: Prophecy and the expansion pack Wing Commander: Secret Ops | |
| Wing Commander Arena | 2007 | Gaia Industries | Electronic Arts | Xbox 360 (XBLA) | | |
| X-Plane: Space Combat Sim | 2004 | Laminar Research | Laminar Research | Windows, Linux, Mac OS X | Released as freeware | |
| X-COM: Interceptor | 1998 | Microprose | Microprose | Windows | | |
| X – Ekkusu | 1992 | Nintendo | Nintendo | Game Boy | Released in Japan only; to be followed by a DSiWare exclusive sequel, X-Scape | |
| Xenocracy | 1998 | Simis | Grolier Interactive | Windows, PlayStation | | |
| XF5700 Mantis Experimental Fighter | 1992 | Microprose | Microprose | DOS | | |
| Jupiter Strike | 1995 | Taito | Interplay | Windows, PlayStation | | |
| Renegade: The Battle for Jacob's Star | 1995 | Midnight Software | Strategic Simulations Inc | Windows | | |
| Warhead | 1989 | Motion Picture House | Activision | Amiga, Atari ST | Mission based. Newtonian flight model. Designed by Glyn Williams. | |
| Heat Signature | 2017 | Suspicious Developments | Suspicious Developments | PC | Top-down shooter which lets players fly through space to board ships and take down factions through killing and strategy. | |
| Void Crew | 2023 | Hutlihut Games | Focus Entertainment | PC | | |

=== Space trading and space combat games ===
| Title | Release year | Developer | Publisher | Platform | Notes | Ref. |
|---|---|---|---|---|---|---|
| 3030 Deathwar | 2007 | Bird in Sky | Crunchy Leaf Games | Windows | | |
| Archimedean Dynasty | 1996 | Massive Development | Blue Byte | MS-DOS | Play occurs in a submarine and under the ocean; many reviews have stated the look and feel of this game as that of a space sim. | |
| Battlecruiser 3000AD | 1996 | 3000AD | Take Two Interactive Software, GameTek | Windows | All Battlecruiser and Universal Combat games feature trade. | |
| Starpoint Gemini 2 | 2014 | LGM Games | Iceberg Interactive | Microsoft Windows, Xbox One | Space trading and combat sim / RPG. | |
| DarkStar One | 2006 | Ascaron Entertainment | cdv Software Entertainment | Windows | | |
| DarkStar One: Broken Alliance | 2010 | Gaming Minds Studios | Kalypso Media | Xbox 360 | Enhanced and extended from its predecessor, on Xbox 360 only. | |
| Earth & Beyond | 2002 | Westwood | Electronic Arts | Windows, Mac OS X, Linux | MMORPG; Electronic Arts officially shut down this game's servers in 2004, but as of 2011, a fan-made revival project is working on an emulator. | |
| Elite | 1984 | David Braben, Ian Bell | Acornsoft, Firebird | Acorn Archimedes, Acorn Electron, Amiga, Amstrad CPC, Apple II, Atari ST, BBC Micro, Commodore 64, DOS, MSX, NES, ZX Spectrum | A seminal work in the genre; many other games on these lists show influence by it. | |
| Elite Dangerous | 2014 | Frontier Developments | Frontier Developments | Windows, OS X, PS4, Xbox One | The fourth game in the Elite series featuring a persistent universe and online multiplayer. | |
| Escape Velocity | 1996 | Matt Burch, Ambrosia Software | Ambrosia Software | Mac OS | Effectively a modernized shareware Elite clone with RPG elements, with an extensive modding community. | |
| EV Override | 1998 | Matt Burch, Peter Cartwright, Ambrosia Software | Ambrosia Software | Mac OS | Originally a third-party plugin for Escape Velocity, later adopted as an official sequel | |
| EV Nova | 2002 | Matt Burch, ATMOS Software, Ambrosia Software | Ambrosia Software | Mac OS, Mac OS X, Windows | Third and final game in the Escape Velocity series (like EVO, also originally a third-party plugin), which also spawned a trading card game set in the same universe | |
| Eve Online | 2003 | CCP Games | CCP Games | Mac OS X, Windows | Player-driven, persistent-world MMORPG set in a science fiction space setting | |
| Rebel Galaxy | 2015 | Double Damage Games | Double Damage Games | Mac OS X, Windows | Modern freeform set in a dynamic science fiction space setting | |
| Evochron Alliance | 2005 | StarWraith 3D Games | StarWraith 3D Games | Windows | | |
| Evochron Renegades | 2007 | StarWraith 3D Games | StarWraith 3D Games | Windows | | |
| Evochron Legends | 2009 | StarWraith 3D Games | StarWraith 3D Games | Windows | | |
| Frontier: Elite II | 1993 | Frontier Developments | Konami, GameTek | Amiga, Amiga CD32, Atari ST, DOS | | |
| Frontier: First Encounters | 1995 | Frontier Developments | Konami, GameTek | DOS | Often called Elite III. | |
| Flatspace | 2003 | Cornutopia Software | Cornutopia Software | Windows | Play is open-ended: activities available include trading, missions, exploration, bounty hunting, space piracy, and police work. | |
| Freelancer | 2003 | Digital Anvil | Microsoft | Windows | Supports keyboard/mouse controls, no joysticks. | |
| Hardwar | 1998 | The Software Refinery | Gremlin Interactive, Interplay | Windows | Ships never leave the planet, yet this futuristic sim is very similar to Elite. | |
| Independence War 2: Edge of Chaos | 2001 | Particle Systems Ltd. | Infogrames | Windows | Like its predecessor, features a Newtonian flight model. | |
| Infinite Space | 2010 | PlatinumGames | Sega | Nintendo DS | First space combat sim with trading to become available for the DS. | |
| Jumpgate: The Reconstruction Initiative | 2001 | NetDevil | 3DO, Mightygames, NetDevil | Windows | Prequel to Jumpgate Evolution | |
| Lightspeed | 1990 | MicroProse | MicroProse | Tandy, DOS | | |
| Moonfall | 1991 | Jukka Tapanimäki | 21st Century Entertainment Ltd. | Commodore 64, Amiga | | |
| No Man's Sky | 2016 | Hello Games | Hello Games | PS4, PS5, Windows, Xbox One, Xbox Series X/S | | |
| Nomad | 1993 | Intense Interactive | GameTek | DOS | | |
| Omnitrend's Universe | 1983 | William G. M. Leslie, Thomas R. Carbone | Omnitrend Software | Atari 8-bit, Apple II, MS-DOS | | |
| Oolite | 2006 | Giles Williams | aegidian.org | Windows, Linux, Mac OS X | Free software remake of original 1984 Elite | |
| The Precursors | 2010 | Deep Shadows | Game Factory Interactive | Windows | Was released in English on Gamersgate | |
| Protostar: War on the Frontier | 1993 | Tsunami Media, Inc. | Tsunami Media, Inc. | DOS | Electronic Arts originally contracted Tsunami Media to create Starflight 3: Protostar, this contract was canceled; game was released as Protostar: War on the Frontier, original Starflight and Starflight 2 are not included in this list as they are strategy/role-playing video game oriented and the view of the ship is a top down perspective | |
| RiftSpace | 2004 | StarWraith 3D Games | StarWraith 3D Games | Windows | Released as freeware | |
| Rebel Galaxy Outlaw | 2019 | Double Damage Games | Double Damage Games | Windows, Nintendo Switch, PS4, Xbox One | Prequel to Rebel Galaxy. | |
| Space Vikings | 1982 | Mitchell Robbins | Sublogic | Apple II | | |
| Universal Combat | 2004 | 3000AD | DreamCatcher Interactive, Inc. | Windows | The follow-up to the Battlecruiser series from Darek Smart | |
| Wing Commander: Privateer | 1993 | Origin Systems | Electronic Arts | DOS, Macintosh | | |
| Privateer 2: The Darkening | 1996 | Origin Systems | Electronic Arts | DOS, Macintosh | | |
| Space Engineers | 2019 | Keen Software House | Keen Software House | Windows, (Xbox TBD) | Open ended sandbox with modelled physics, voxel environment builder game. Single- and Multiplayer. Trade enabled through DLC. | |
| Space Force: Rogue Universe | 2007 | Provox Games | DreamCatcher Interactive, Inc., JoWooD Productions | Windows | | |
| Space Rogue | 1989 | Origin Systems | Origin Systems | DOS, Macintosh, Amiga, Atari ST, FM Towns | | |
| Starfield | 2023 | Bethesda Game Studios | Bethesda Softworks | Windows, Xbox Series X/S | | |
| Starpoint Gemini | 2011 | Little Green Men Games | Little Green Men Games, Iceberg Interactive | Windows | | |
| Starport: Galactic Empires | 2004 | PlayTechTonics, Inc. | PlayTechTonics, Inc. | Windows | MMORPG, free to play, with optional items able to be bought with real money | |
| Star Wars Galaxies | 2003 | Sony Online Entertainment, Electronic Arts Japan | LucasArts | Windows | MMORPG | |
| Starglider 2 | 1988 | Argonaut Software Ltd. | Rainbird Software | Amiga, Atari ST, DOS, ZX Spectrum | | |
| SunDog: Frozen Legacy | 1984 | FTL Games | Accolade | Apple II, Atari ST | | |
| Tachyon: The Fringe | 2000 | NovaLogic | NovaLogic | Windows | | |
| Taikodom | 2008 | Hoplon Infotainment | Hoplon Infotainment | Windows | Considered a MMOG | |
| Terminus | 2000 | Vicarious Visions | Vatical Entertainment | Windows, Mac OS, Linux | | |
| Vendetta Online | 2004 | Guild Software | Strategy First | Windows, Mac OS X, Linux | MMORPG | |
| X: Beyond the Frontier | 1999 | Egosoft | THQ, SouthPeak Games | Windows | | |
| X2: The Threat | 2003 | Egosoft | Deep Silver, QV Software International | Windows, Mac OS X, Linux | | |
| X3: Reunion | 2005 | Egosoft | Deep Silver, Enlight | Windows, Mac OS X, Linux | | |
| X3: Terran Conflict | 2008 | Egosoft | Deep Silver, Enlight | Windows, Mac OS X, Linux | Final chapter in the story of the X series of games | |
| X3: Albion Prelude | 2011 | Egosoft | Egosoft | Windows, Linux | Continuation of the X series of space simulation games | |
| X Rebirth | 2013 | Egosoft | Egosoft | Windows, Mac OS X, Linux | Continuation and reboot of the X series of space simulation games | |
| X4: Foundations | 2018 | Egosoft | Egosoft | Windows, Linux | Continuation of the rebooted X series of space simulation games | |
| Xiphos | 1990 | Voodoo | Electronic Zoo | Windows, Amiga, Atari ST | Play resembles Elite, involving first-person space shooting and trading | |

== See also ==
- Space flight simulation game
- Planetarium software
- List of observatory software
- Kitten Space Agency — under development successor to Kerbal Space Program
