= Evochron Alliance =

- Developer(s): StarWraith 3D Games
- Publisher(s): StarWraith 3D Games
- Series: Evochron
- Platform(s): Microsoft Windows
- Release: WW: May 12, 2007
- Genre(s): Space simulation
- Mode(s): Single-player, multiplayer

Evochron Alliance is a shareware First Person 3D Space Combat & Mercenary Simulation Windows game by American indie developer StarWraith 3D Games and sequel to RiftSpace, retroactively renamed as Evochron Riftspace. It features zero gravity inertia based 'Newtonian' style flight model with complete 3-way rotation and 3-way direction control.

== Series ==
Title	Date released	Platform(s)
RiftSpace	February 1, 2004	Windows
Evochron	March 9, 2005	Windows
Evochron Alliance	May 12, 2007	Windows
Evochron Renegades	September 28, 2007	Windows
Evochron Legends	February 5, 2009	Windows
Evochron Mercenary	September 17, 2010	Windows
Evochron Legacy	January 18, 2016	Windows

The Evochron series is StarWraith 3D Games' space simulator series. It is set in the eponymous Evochron Quadrant, home to the human race. Throughout the centuries of history explored by the games, humanity is split into two factions, the Alliance of Sol and the Federation, who are in conflict with each other.

== Gameplay ==
Evochron was the sequel to 2004's RiftSpace and was largely designed around the feedback received from the original game. Freeform gameplay was expanded substantially by allowing the player to transport and trade commodities and mine material from asteroids. Gameplay was also entirely real time, so there were no cut scenes or menus that suspended the game's universe. Seamless planetary descents were introduced with Evochron, allowing players to travel from space to stations on a planet's surface and back again without cut scenes, immediate scene changes, or loading screens. Long-distance travel was managed with built-in jump drives rather than jump gates, giving the player control over when and where they travelled from system to system. Ship-to-ship trading and multiplayer were also introduced. The game was discontinued and upgraded to Evochron Alliance.

Evochron Alliance was an updated remaster of Evochron. It featured several major improvements requested by players, including a new shipyard that lets the player customize their ship for offense, defense, exploration, and/or speed. New modification options allow players to customize many aspects of the game's design from the cockpit to the ships themselves. A new dedicated interactive training mode helped introduce players to the game. The Newtonian physics were adjusted to a more manageable system by player request. New objects were also introduced such as hidden storage containers with free items, planetary moons, particle nebula clouds, and wormholes. Many new systems were also introduced, including three Vonari systems.

While Arvoch Conflict was in development, Starwraith 3D Games also worked on applying the cockpit graphics system to Evochron Alliance. Evochron Alliance 2.0 implemented the new 3D cockpit and HUD system while also introducing all-new ship models. 2.0 also added support for TrackIR and panning first person view control. Directional shielding was added along with several improvements to customizing options, gameplay, and control options.

It has multiplayer capabilities with up to 24 players.

Its successor, Evochron Renegades, was released in September, 2007.

== Reception ==
Reception

Review scores
Publication	Score
Eurogamer	6/10
PC Games (DE)	71%
PC Action	55%

Evochron Alliance received mixed reviews upon release. Herbert Aichinger of Eurogamer praised the game's depth, citing its scope, the degree of control and customisation of ships and approaches to gameplay, and the game's editing features, whilst finding the game's tutorial and lack of guidance to be inadequate. Harald Fränkel of PC Action critiqued the game's difficulty and lack of "clear navigation or user-friendliness", but recognised the game's depth, ship-building features and multiplayer play. Benjamin Bezold of PC Games observed an "interesting game" behind the "slightly dusty look and boring menu design".
