= Star Wraith IV: Reviction =

2004 video game

- Star Wraith IV
- Developer: StarWraith 3D Games LLC
- Publisher: StarWraith 3D Games LLC
- Designer: Shawn Bower
- Series: Starwraith
- Platform: Microsoft Windows
- Release: 2004: WW: June 4, 2004; GEO: 2005; RUS: April 27, 2006; WW: January 2008 (freeware release)
- Genre: Space simulation
- Modes: Single-player, multiplayer

Star Wraith IV: Reviction (2004–2005) is the last game bearing the Star Wraith title in the Star Wraith 3D Games series. It was released together with Riftspace, a freeform mercenary game. While having many resemblances to Star Wraith: Shadows of Orion, Star Wraith IV had a linear campaign and far more capable multiplayer capabilities. It quickly became one of the most popular online games in the series, until Arvoch Conflict was released in 2006.

== Story ==
Alliance forces successfully destroyed the Vonari capital ship that was headed for Earth (see: Star Wraith: Shadows of Orion). After sustaining major losses in Orion, Rucker, Deneb and Sierra, the success of Earth's defense finally gave the Navy much needed time to regroup and redesign many technologies to confront the new alien threat. Everyone knew that it was just a matter of time before they would strike again, and this time, they would have the advantage of knowing our capabilities. They would undoubtedly be faster, smarter, and more powerful. So the Alliance upper ranks decided to maximize whatever time remained to transform the military to a technology level capable of resisting any future attacks. At the top of the priority list was the Star Wraith space superiority fighter, which would receive several improvements to its weapon systems and shielding. The Alliance hopes to be prepared for whatever attack the Vonari may initiate, but another problem seems to be forming.

Rumors have surfaced that indicate the Federation may be trying to convince several high-ranking Alliance officers to defect. The Federation does have a larger military force by number, so why they are interested in some of Alliance officers remains a mystery. If the rumors prove to be true, the Special Operations Command may be dispatched to enemy territory to investigate further. If they plan to attack the Alliance at some point, the Alliance also needs to be ready for them.

== Released as Freeware ==
As of January 2008, StarWraith has released Star Wraith IV: Reviction as freeware.
