= Lego Universe =

2010 video game

- Developer: NetDevil (Note: Ported to OS X by TransGaming Technologies)
- Publisher: The Lego Group
- Composer: Brian Tyler
- Engine: Gamebryo
- Platforms: Microsoft Windows, OS X
- Release: WW: October 26, 2010
- Genre: Massively multiplayer online
- Mode: Multiplayer

Lego Universe was a massively multiplayer online game that was available from October 2010 to January 2012. The game was developed by NetDevil and released on October 26, 2010, with an early opening (October 8, 2010) for Lego "Founders", users who had pre-ordered the game. It was globally distributed by Warner Bros. Interactive Entertainment. Its release was delayed from original estimates of 2009. Teasers were released by Lego in 2007 and late November 2008 to promote the game, and also in 2009 for one last promotion. The game was available in English and German. The servers were shut down permanently on January 31, 2012, due to 'unsatisfactory revenue' from within the game's target audience.

== Story ==
=== Plot ===
Lego Universe took place in an alternate universe populated by Lego minifigures. The premise is that years ago, a team of four went on a great journey to seek the last essence of pure Imagination: Doctor Overbuild, Duke Exeter, Hael Storm, and Baron Typhonus. After having found it on the mysterious planet Crux, the greedy tycoon of the expedition, Baron, was pulled into the source, fusing with it to create a maelstrom of chaotic dark energy. However, even though Doctor Overbuild plugged the hole, the stress caused Crux to explode into thousands of other worlds. After the incident, the explorers decided to form their own factions, Doctor Overbuild creating the Assembly, Duke Exeter forming the Sentinels, Hael Storm leading the Venture League, and the Baron's protégé Vanda Darkflame, creating the Paradox. The factions worked together to create the Nexus Force in order to destroy the Maelstrom and its minions. The Venture Explorer, a ship carrying new recruits is being attacked by the Maelstrom. The player, aboard the ship, escapes to Avant Gardens with the aid of Sky Lane. Here, a disaster involving Paradox has infected Avant Gardens with Maelstrom and released a beast called the Spider Queen. After travelling through the world and discovering the Spider Queen's location, the player destroys the Spider Queen at the Block Yard and claims their first Property, where they could place collected models and bricks. At that point, the players can travel to Nimbus Station if they pay for membership, where they choose which faction to join. From there, the player could travel to other worlds like Forbidden Valley or Gnarled Forest.

=== Factions ===
The game consisted of four factions - The Sentinels, The Venture League, The Assembly, and The Paradox. The player could only join one faction. Each Faction had three specialties that had 3 different ranks and gear. There were two valiant weapons per faction which could be bought at the Nexus Tower.

- The Sentinels were combat based, using heavy weapons and armor. Their specialties included Knight, Samurai, and Space Ranger.
- The Venture League was based on exploring, utilizing combinations of light weapons and fast attacks. Their specialties included Daredevil, Buccaneer, and Adventurer.
- The Assembly focused on building and creating, using gear that builds weapons. Their specialties included Engineer, Summoner, and Inventor.
- The Paradox relied on studying the Maelstrom, and using it against itself, mainly using ranged attacks. Their specialties included Space Marauder, Sorcerer, and Shinobi.

=== Worlds ===
==== Venture Explorer ====
After creating a minifigure, players came to the Venture Explorer. It acted as a tutorial for any newcomers, teaching the basics of running, jumping, and smashing. Ultimately, players built a rocket and headed off to Avant Gardens with help from Sky Lane. Also, members were able to participate in a "Return to the Venture Explorer" with difficult enemies such as Hammer Stromlings, Corrupted Sentries, Hammerhurl Stromlings, and Elite Dark Spiderlings; though this was not part of any tutorial.

==== Avant Gardens ====
This is the second world players would visit. It introduces newcomers to the basic mission scenarios and gets them prepared for what they will soon come to face. In addition to the storyline missions, there were side missions and bonus activities such as survival and foot races. Players with memberships saw this as the first zone to see tamable pets in. The Maelstrom minions here are easy, such as the Stromling, Stromling Mech, and the Dark Spiderling, born from the Block Yard's boss, the Spider Queen. The mini-game here is Avant Garden Survival. Here you must survive against Stromlings, Dark Spiderlings, Stromling Mechs, and other enemies more difficult to destroy. Avant Gardens is where you can tame the pets such as Doberman, Triceratops, and Buffalo. The two properties where you can build your creations in Avant Gardens are Block Yard and Avant Grove.

==== Nimbus Station ====
Nimbus Station acted as the Hub for members and was the third world players will visit. Here, you could access most of the other worlds. After the seventh mission, you must select one of the 4 factions (The Assembly, the Sentinels, the Venture League or Paradox.) Here you could enter yourself in a race against other minifigures in the Vertigo Loop racetrack. You could also participate in the Battle of Nimbus Station, an event similar to survival in Avant Gardens but incorporating a wave system and taking place in Nimbus Station's past, fighting off stronger enemies. Members enjoyed many numerous of features in Nimbus Station, including more pet choices. Also there was a rocket pad to Frostburgh [valid December - February 2010 / 11] near Christmas, the portal to Starbase 3001, and the Lego Club Door [near Red Blocks]. The properties here are Nimbus Rock and Nimbus Isle. The Pets here are Robot Dog and Skunk Pets. There were no enemies on Nimbus Station, except those in the Battle of Nimbus Station.

==== Pet Cove ====
Pet Cove was primarily a hub for players with memberships to learn how to tame Pets and do stunts with their Pets. It had a large variety of Pets available to obtain.

==== Gnarled Forest ====
Gnarled Forest was a pirate infested forest-styled zone unlocked at the same time as Forbidden Valley. Minifigures could learn new abilities here and unlock new weapons such as the first guns featured in the game. The pets available in this world were a tortoise, a boar, a crocodile, an elephant, and a hermit crab.

==== Forbidden Valley ====
Forbidden Valley was unlocked at the same time as Gnarled Forest. It was the first world themed on ninjas, and was primarily rocky, dark, and barren, with many drop-offs and cliffs. The central area of the Forbidden Valley was a huge tree which was a sort of safe zone. It included a mini-game in which the player could fight three dragons. It also introduced several new enemies, such as the Dark Ronin and a type of Dark Ronin which rode a skeleton horse.

==== Nexus Tower ====
Nexus Tower was the hub of faction information. Here players could accept missions from the faction leader and interact with other items within Nexus Tower. The last piece of the Imagination Nexus is kept here. Like Nimbus Station, Nexus Tower contained no enemies.

==== Crux Prime ====
Crux Prime was the largest of the planetary fragments created in Crux's explosion. Here can you meet many enemies you have met before but in stronger form along with bosses of all varieties (such as Stromling Invaders), and also a myriad of Ninjago Skeletons, straight from the Ninjago Monastery, attempting to mine Maelstrom Crystals. There are only 7 characters that the player can interact with in Crux Prime. Enemies also included the 'leaders' of types of enemy (e.g. Butterscorch, the dragon leader). All leader enemies show up in a slightly different colour from other Crux Prime invaders. The only tameable pet here was the Skeleton Dragon which was tamable as part of the main story line on Crux Prime.

==== Ninjago Monastery ====
The Ninjago Monastery was a new Lego Universe world added to the game within a new build of the game on September 20, 2011. It featured more expansively than Crux Prime the Lego theme Ninjago. The world in comparison to the other worlds was one of the largest. It included the Ninjago Monastery, Skeleton Battlefields and the Ninjago Caves. Players upon arriving followed a chain of missions to learn all four elements of Spinjitsu, from the four ninjas in their temples within the monastery, and help defend the Monastery from skeletons. With the world also came a new crafting feature known as game cooking. A vendor in the Ninjago Monastery traded a special consumable item in exchange for common consumable items found around Lego Universe. Aside from the main mission chain that was to learn Spinjitsu, there were several other sub-plot mission chains available to players. The Ninjago Monastery world included many new daily missions and puzzles. The Ninjago Monastery also included an Earth Dragon Pet that can be tamed after completing certain missions. The Ninjago Monastery was the last major addition to Lego Universe. A battle against Lord Garmadon in the fire temple was planned (and advertised) to be added into the game, but was not rolled out as a result of the server shutdown in January 2012.

== Gameplay ==
Lego Universe brought players from around the world together to build and fight against the Maelstrom and its minions. The player assumed the role of a Lego minifigure and travelled to various themed worlds, each with different enemies and challenges. Players could collect and earn gear that might be worn and fought with to aid them in achieving a wide range of set goals. Also, players could have Specialties, each one with their unique gear. In addition, minifigures could gain ranks which allow them to use more advanced gear.

The accessible full worlds were the pirate-themed Gnarled Forest, faction-oriented Nimbus Station, green and festive Avant Gardens, high-tech Nexus Tower, Maelstrom based Crux Prime, Ninjago's world Ninjago Monastery and the ninja-based Forbidden Valley. Custom-built rocket ships were used by players to travel between these worlds. Three racetracks are found on these worlds that allow players to race against each other with custom race cars.

Throughout the game players could collect Lego pieces that can be used to freely build models on their personal properties. Properties could be set to only allow in certain friends or to give access to anybody in the game.

== Promotion ==
=== Trailers ===
The original trailer, leaked around early 2008, showed early concepts of the game. These include character customization using the traditional Lego method, a workshop where a car is created from Lego bricks, a Lego city populated with sets from numerous different themes, and a short theatrical battle between an eye-patched Lego minifigure and a "Darkling". In January 2010, six new gameplay videos, an interview, and another trailer were shown at CES 2010 and released on the internet. A theatrical-style trailer depicting the background story was revealed at the E3 Gaming Expo.

=== Bradford Rant ===
In November 2009, a website for the fictional "Bradford-Rant Institute for Cosmic Kinesis" was linked on the Lego Universe web page. The institute was supposedly tracking seven Lego "Pods", which landed in various parts of the United States and Europe. Fans could track and find these pods, all of which landed between November 2009 and early January 2010. Once a pod was found, its data was put up on the Bradford-Rant page. After all of the Pods were found, a new trailer for Lego Universe and the tagline for the game, "Answer the Call: Save Imagination," was released.

=== The Great Minifig Mission ===
In January 2010, the Bradford Rant promotion then was turned over to "The Great Minifig Mission" promotion in which Lego account holders complete missions in order to help minifigs enter the universe. The missions are released at an approximate rate of one every week when the site is updated. When the promotion started, it had a timer ending on April 2, 2010, at 12:00am midnight, GMT, which is April 1 at 8:00pm ET. On March 27, the timer reset to June 2, 2010, at 12:00am GMT, or June 1 at 8:00pm ET.

=== E3 2010 ===
On June 15–17, 2010, the Lego Universe Team hosted an event at the 2010 E3 Gaming Expo, where attendees could play in the Beta. It was during this event that the global distributor of Lego Universe was announced, Warner Bros. Interactive Entertainment, along with the official release date.

== Testing ==
=== Alpha ===
Beginning December 8, 2009, members of the Lego Kids Inner Circle who had been members before December 7 were invited to test the game before the beta started. Before this, the only people who could play the game were Lego employees and their friends and families. The game was in a very early state; only a few worlds were ready for testing, and the parts that were playable had several glitches. As time went on, glitches were fixed, and more worlds were opened. Several concepts tested in the Alpha test did not make it into the Beta and were scrapped.

=== Beta ===
In January 2010, Lego announced that, at the Consumer Electronics Show, there would be a demonstration and sign-ups for beta testing.

The link to the closed beta signup page was originally leaked on an LU Producer's Twitter page, allowing some people to sign up for the game before anyone else. The February issue of the Lego Universe newsletter, released soon after, also contained a link to the Beta sign up page for Lego Universe, wherein subscribers were able to sign up for a chance to be in the Beta Test for PC only (though a Mac version was released later on during testing.) Members of My Lego Network on Lego.com also received a message inviting them to the Beta sign ups. In March, the Lego Universe website featured a link on an article directly to the Beta sign ups. Lego Universe beta invites were sent out to the first round of non-alpha testers on March 10; the beta test then ended on September 26 at 7:59 PM EDT (September 29 at 1:00 PM EDT, on the German Server) to prepare for the "Founders" launch on October 8.

== Purchase ==
Lego Universe was based on a subscription known as "Game-Time". A player could choose from one, six, and twelve month subscriptions (the six and twelve-month subscription times rendering special in-game bonuses when bought). Once a user bought a subscription, the Game Time refill code was sent periodically based on the subscription that was purchased, using a process known as auto-renewal. Game Time could also be purchased in the form of non-renewed game cards.

=== Normal order ===
Lego Universe became available for normal order on October 27, 2010. The Normal Order shipped with only the Lego Universe DVD and one month of free game time, though promotions did occasionally arise which provided additional exclusive items. The game was also available for download online, through services such as Steam.

=== Free-to-Play ===
Aside from the normal membership packages the game also offered a free to play option with certain limitations, such as there being only two worlds available for free play, one being Venture Explorer — a tutorial world — and the other Avant Gardens. You could take part in the fight against the Spider Queen and have temporary gear which involves armour and weapons for each Faction. There was a button that asked players if they wanted to become a full member, where they would gain access to every location in the Universe, alongside more missions & achievements. Free to play required the user to enter a Lego ID & password and create a character with limited name options, whereas members could create their own made-up names. They were also limited on having a maximum 10,000 coins to buy items and food. They did have access to Block Yard where they could build their own creations. They were not allowed to trade with other minifigures, or have more than five friends on their friends list.

Many players thought it was challenging to increase in level after completing the main story line, nevertheless many players participated in the free-to-play option. The idea for free-to-play came from a fan from the "ask Max" section of the website.

=== Game server shutdown ===
On Monday, January 30, 2012, precisely at midnight, the Lego Universe servers shut down, and the game is no longer available to play. Jesper Vilstrup, Vice President of Lego Universe, stated, "Unfortunately, we have not been able to build a satisfactory revenue model in our target group, and therefore, have decided to close the game." For the last month of Lego Universe, players with membership were offered a month of play at no cost as a 'Thank you' from the Lego Universe Team. A newly titled 'Lego Minifigures Online' MMORPG was released on June 29, 2015, as a successor game until its closure on September 30, 2016.

=== Restoration projects ===
Following the game's closure, some fans began projects to revive the game through emulation. The most notable project is Darkflame Universe, which has had talks with the LEGO Group. On October 3, 2021, Darkflame Universe announced that they will be abandoning their private hosting of a server and going open source later in the year, due to being unable to reach a legal agreement with the LEGO Group regarding public online play. On December 5, 2021, Darkflame Universe went open source.

== Reception ==
Reception

Aggregate scores
Aggregator	Score
GameRankings	72.44%
Metacritic	70/100

Lego Universe received a Metacritic score of 70/100 and a GameRankings score of 72.44%.
