= Auto Assault =

2006 video game

- North American cover
- Developer: NetDevil
- Publisher: NCSOFT
- Platform: Windows
- Release: April 13, 2006
- Genres: Vehicular combat, role playing
- Mode: Multiplayer

Auto Assault was a massively multiplayer online game (or MMOG), developed by NetDevil and published by NCSOFT. It combined vehicular combat with role-playing elements, allowing the player to explore a post-apocalyptic future in customizable cars, motorcycles, semis, and tanks. It took inspiration, in part, from the Mad Max series of films.

Players could choose to play as one of three fictional factions—Humans, Mutants, and Biomeks—as well as a class to determine the type of character they would have. The majority of the gameplay took place in a vehicle, but the player could leave the vehicle when entering towns in order to purchase items, talk to contacts, etc.

The game servers were shut down on August 31, 2007, and players were no longer billed. NetDevil issued a statement shortly after the shutdown news, citing an agreement with NCsoft to buy out the IP rights was not reached.

== Synopsis ==
After years of widescale open war between three factions—Humans, mutants, and the human-created Biomeks—the issues among the groups are largely pacified on the worldwide scale. Conflict between the three remain with small scale battles involving armored cars, trucks, motorcycles, semis and tanks that have advanced weaponry. This is the fictional, futuristic world the player starts and plays the game in.

== Gameplay ==
The game takes place in the 23rd century, after the sterilization attempt that left the Earth in ruins. Players play as either a new generation of Mutants, a BioMek or one of the newly emerging Humans. Players fight in their race's area of control against non-playable characters (NPCs) and eventually reach Ground Zero, or GZ. There, they can either fight against NPCs or Players in two different "layers" known as instances. One "layer" is the PvP layer, where the player can fight against players of opposing races. The other "layer" is controlled by the faction you belong to. It is the non-PvP layer where players usually complete their quests from GZ. The PvP elements of the game are not available in this layer, since only other members of your faction are there. All NPC enemies are in both layers. The game centers on third-person vehicular combat using state-of-the-art weapons to fight foes.

Auto Assault takes place in two settings; towns and the outside world. The town is experienced by moving the player's customized character around, interacting with NPCs, other players, and environmental objects. Upgrades and vehicles can be bought here. When the player chooses to exit the city he/she is in, they are taken to the outside world, where they traverse the terrain in heavily armed vehicles. Combat is reminiscent of a third-person shooter game, with movement, aiming and firing being done in real time using the keyboard and mouse. There are also character skills, which activate special abilities.

Auto Assault differs from other MMORPGs as it does not have a Death Penalty and the player can die without consequence.

== Shutdown ==
Due to lack of subscribers, a decision was made to terminate support for the product. This was communicated by the company on the Public Forums one month prior to shutting down. On July 2, 2007, it was officially announced that Auto Assault's servers would be shut down August 31 and the subscribers' accounts would be 'reconciled'. Offers to continue to run servers by various parties were denied, but additional “Parting Gifts” were sent via e-mail with, "...opportunities to take a part in some of our other products, including Richard Garriott’s Tabula Rasa and City of Heroes..."

== Reception ==
Reception

Aggregate score
Aggregator	Score
Metacritic	72/100

Review scores
Publication	Score
Computer Gaming World	(average)
Edge	5/10
Eurogamer	7/10
Game Informer	7/10
GamePro	3.5/5
GameRevolution	C+
GameSpot	7.2/10
GameSpy	3.5/5
GameZone	8/10
IGN	7.5/10
PC Gamer (US)	79%

At the time of release, the game received "average" reviews according to the review aggregation website Metacritic.

The Academy of Interactive Arts & Sciences nominated Auto Assault for "Massively Multiplayer Game of the Year" at the 10th Annual Interactive Achievement Awards.
