= Evochron Renegades =

2007 video game

- Developer: StarWraith 3D Games LLC
- Publisher: StarWraith 3D Games LLC
- Designer: Shawn Bower
- Series: Evochron
- Platform: Microsoft Windows
- Release: WW: September 28, 2007
- Genre: Space simulation
- Modes: Single-player, multiplayer

Evochron Renegades is a freeform videogame that forms the 2007 installment in the indie StarWraith 3D Games series of space simulation games. It is the sequel to Evochron: Alliance 2.0. Evochron Renegades features a vast and seamless universe that lets the player fly anywhere, without loading screens or choppy environment flipping. The game is especially notable for being the successful product of a one-man development studio.

Its sequel, Evochron Legends, was released in 2009.

== Gameplay ==
Evochron Renegades features three main gameplay modes: training, freeform single player (which includes an integrated story), and multiplayer. In either single player or multiplayer, the player can choose their own path in the game: becoming a pirate, miner, mercenary, trader, racer, smuggler, explorer, provider of cleaning services, virtually anything, without having to preselect a profession, guild or race.

Multiplayer was not officially announced as a feature of Renegades, but was later announced through a hunt for an unknown easteregg during the beta testing. Testers quickly unravelled textual clues in the games text files, finally resulting in the common understanding the easteregg was in fact a multiplayer mode.

The whole game fits into a 30Mb download - it creates such a large and sophisticated universe through using computer code and mathematical algorithms to instantly build images, meshes and textures in a PC's memory (procedural generation), then the game uses these in the same way a normal game would if it were calling fixed files from the hard-drive.

== Universe ==
The game universe is three-dimensional and is entirely seamless, meaning one can fly from planet to planet and space station to space station, or simply explore other features - given one has the fuel, resources and time. While occasional secrets may be found on such trips, it can take hours or even days of in-game time to fly from planet to planet. To avoid such journeys, every ship can be outfitted with a Fulcrum Drive which allows the player to instantly 'jump' from point to point within range of the capabilities of the equipped Fulcrum Drive. There are five levels of Fulcrum Drive, and a sixth, secret and experimental drive. Also, throughout the universe are Fulcrum Gates which can transport ships through much larger distances in an instant. These gates have a set destination, and form the main paths throughout the game's universe. The final method of transportation are wormholes, which are typically one-way and can send a player to otherwise unreachable locations. Evochron Renegades is the first StarWraith game to feature a seamless universe.

== Learning curve ==
Evochron Renegades has a steep learning curve, mainly involving the memorisation of numerous keyboard commands. The lengthy interactive training mode at the start of the game instructs new players on the basics of flying, combat, navigation, inventory management, station docking, planetary descents, and trading. There is a short manual (to be found in the program directory), and a strategy guide at the developer's website. There are also fan-made guides such as the interactive The Hitchhiker's Guide to the Evochron Galaxy, and various printable star-system maps.

== Availability and updates ==
The free demo mode contains 90 minutes of single player gameplay, after the tutorial. At August 2008, both the shareware and full versions of the game are at version 1.88. The game is only available online. There is also a free construction kit and guide, allowing the game to be modded by fans.

== Reception ==
As a self-distributed shareware game, and one in a tight niche area of gaming, Evochron Renegades has had few mainstream reviews. The game featured on the cover of Game Creators magazine, October 2007.
