= StarMade =

- Developer: Schine GmbH
- Publisher: Schine GmbH
- Designer: Robin Promesberger
- Platforms: Windows, macOS, Linux
- Release: February 28, 2012 (alpha)
- Genres: Sandbox, space flight simulator
- Modes: Single-player, multiplayer

StarMade is an open world space sandbox Minecraft clone developed by Schine GmbH that was released on 28 February 2012 as a public alpha for Windows, macOS, and Linux.

== Gameplay ==
A player-created ship

In StarMade, the player, an astronaut, explores the proceduraly generated voxel universe. This universe contains randomly generated galaxies, stars, asteroids, artificial structures (such as space stations and shops), and planets. Players create and customize their own spacecraft to explore the universe. Players create ships out of blocks, where they can then proceed to customize their ship in the game's "Ship Build Mode". Ships can be customized with a variety of materials to enhance performance, add new features or create combat/defense systems. In single-player universes, there is the ability to access a "Creative Mode", where the player has access to every block and item in the game.

Crafting is present in the game, and is known as "Manufacturing". Players can craft parts with blocks called "Factories". Each factory has its own inventory and specific list of items that only those blocks can manufacture. Factories require power in order to manufacture other parts. Once a factory has been powered, players can put the ingredients in the right factory block, and it will start producing whatever it is programmed to produce. Players can gather natural resources (such as ore, stone, etc.) or salvage ships and space stations found throughout the universe in order to craft certain parts and items using the manufacturing feature.

The game has a weight-based inventory system and players are limited to the amount of items they can carry. Upon dying, the player will lose a portion of their credits as long as spawn protection isn't active, and players respawn at their current spawn point, which is set using a special block in-game. Players can take damage from several factors, including ship weapons, personal weapons, and the environment.

Starmade has a "Factions" system, where groups of NPCs or players can interact. NPC factions are present in the base game, and users can interact with them. The most commonly encountered NPC factions are traders and pirates. Traders primarily re-stock in-game shops, and pirates attack all other factions on sight. Player created factions are available in both single-player and multiplayer. There is a faction diplomacy system, where faction owners can engage in negotiations and communications with each other. Player controlled factions frequently interact with each other on multiplayer servers within Starmade in various player versus player scenarios.

"Lightning Sphere", a player-created multiplayer minigame

Multiplayer in StarMade is available through player-hosted servers and lets multiple players to interact and communicate with each other in a single universe. Players can also run their own servers on a personal computer. Multiplayer servers offer players a wide range of activities, such as role-playing, enjoying player-created mini-games, collaborating with others, and waging faction warfare.

== Development ==
On July 24, 2013, StarMade was greenlit by the Steam community, meaning the game would eventually be added to the Steam store. It was officially made available on Steam on December 4, 2014.

== See also ==
- List of space flight simulation games
- Lightweight Java Game Library, a Java library used by StarMade.
