= Evochron Legends =

2009 video game

- Evochron Legends' logo
- Developer: StarWraith 3D Games
- Publisher: StarWraith 3D Games
- Designer: Shawn Bower
- Series: Evochron
- Platform: Microsoft Windows
- Release: WW: February 5, 2009
- Genre: Space simulation
- Modes: Single-player, Multiplayer

Evochron Legends is an online science fiction game developed and published by Starwraith 3D Games for Microsoft Windows. It was released on February 5, 2009.

In the game, the player takes the role of a mercenary pilot in the fictional Evochron sector of space and engages in various activities such as mining, trading, bounty hunting, and military flight. The player can pursue story quests and track down and activate scattered beacons throughout the universe to progress.

Its sequel, Evochron Mercenary, was released in 2010.

== Gameplay and Plot ==
Gameplay is comparable to Evochron Renegades, also set in the fictional Evochron sector of space. The gameplay takes a freeform sandbox approach and allows the player to switch from any of the available roles without menu interfaces. Available roles include mining, trading, piracy, exploration, bounty hunting, and military flight. Like in Evochron Renegades, all environments are interactive. All nebulae can be flown through, with some of the clouds actively disabling or hindering player and AI ship systems. Planets can be descended upon in real-time and used to trade upon. Atmospheric flight differs significantly from space flight, although the controls remain identical. Asteroid fields allow the player to mine and use them as temporary cover during combat. Larger asteroids sometimes include tunnel systems that can be explored and used for combat advantages. Objects like planets, stars, and black holes all exert a gravitational pull on the ship.

Flight in Evochron Legends is a hybrid between heavy- and low-inertia flight. By using a ship system called the inertial dampening system (IDS) the player can choose to let the ship automatically adapt the course to the cockpit orientation or to let the ship keep its current heading and speed to turn the ship freely during flight due to the lack of friction in space.

The story revolves around one person chasing the Phantom class battle carrier from Arvoch Conflict and Evochron Renegades.

The story builds slightly further on the earlier Starwraith 3D Games.

A cockpit in Evochron Legends

== Features and Improvements ==
New features include military combat ships ranging from light scouts to heavy interceptors that can be purchased and flown by players, and new capital ships such as Cruisers, Battleships, Command Ships, and Destroyers that can engage in war zone battles. New roles have been added from the previous games, including passenger transport, energy transport, crafting, and capital ship escorting.

=== War Zones ===
Currently, three systems feature war zones, in which the player engages the Vonari along with the military. Through dock-able carriers available in the war zones, players can buy military crafts. By engaging in military missions, the player gains a military rank that allows buying more powerful military crafts.

=== Crafting ===
A new feature is called crafting, in which players use raw commodities to create second-level commodities or usable items. This is done at special constructor stations, which allows the player to create items and more valuable commodities. An amount of platinum can be converted into a long-range probe, and amounts of metal can be crafted into armor plating. Some items can only be crafted by combining multiple commodities together.

=== Commodities ===
New commodities include oxygen, water, gold, and silver. Some of these (oxygen, water) can be gathered from planetary atmospheres and surface. Gold and silver are rare commodities that are both valuable and crucial to create some of the crafted items.

=== Environments ===
While most of the environments from Evochron Renegades return, including planets, cities, stars, stations, nebulae, asteroid fields, and caves, the nebula class that disturbed weaponry has been replaced by a high-energy nebula that jams the jump-drive of the player. A multiplayer mode is present.

=== Difficulty ===
Reviewers noted that while updates adjusted the game's difficulty curve, it remained steep, particularly during initial combat situations. The training mode allows players to select either full training or focus on specific aspects.

== Multiplayer ==
Multiplayer in the Evochron series uses the Seamless Profile System. Thus the pilot profile allows multiplayer profiles. Players can also work on their spacecraft in single player mode.

The game is freeform and allows anyone to host a (dedicated) game server to their rules.

== See also ==
- Evochron Alliance
- Evochron Renegades
