= The Game Creators =

Software companies of the United Kingdom

The Game Creators Ltd
- Formerly: Dark Basic Software Limited (1999–2003)
- Type: Private
- Industry: Software industry
- Founded: 24 March 1999; 27 years ago in Ince-in-Makerfield, England
- Founders: Lee Bamber; Richard Vanner
- Headquarters: Macclesfield, England
- Key people: Lee Bamber (managing director); Richard Vanner (development director)
- Website: thegamecreators.com

The Game Creators Ltd (TGC; formerly Dark Basic Software Limited) is a British software house based in Macclesfield, Cheshire, England, which specialises in software for video game development, originally for the Microsoft Windows platform. The company was established in March 1999 through a partnership between programmers Lee Bamber and Richard Vanner, who were joined by Meash Meakin in 2011 and Deborah Ascott-Jones in 2013.

== Products ==
=== DarkBASIC ===
DarkBASIC was released in the year 2000 as a game creation programming language with accompanying IDE and development tools. The language is a structured form of BASIC, similar to AMOS on the Amiga. The purpose of the language is video game creation using Microsoft's DirectX from a BASIC programming language. It is marketed for its ability to allow a novice game developer to make playable games after following its tutorials. It can create both 2D and 3D games by providing function libraries that enable a game to be programmed with considerably less code than with a language such as C++, especially without such dedicated libraries. The software consists of an IDE, debugger and interpreter, and an engine built on DirectX 7. The compiler emits bytecode that is appended to an interpreter to create a stand-alone executable. Star Wraith is an example of a game made with DarkBASIC.

In 2002, an updated version called DarkBASIC Professional was released that was able to use newer versions of DirectX. The earlier version of the software is now informally referred to as DarkBASIC Classic to distinguish the two products.

On 14 August 2008, the last DarkBASIC version (1.21) was released. Since the introduction of DarkBASIC Professional, The Game Creators have stated that there will be no further updates to the language, although it will still be sold.

In 2015, TGC lead developer Lee Bamber decided to open source DarkBASIC Professional for the community, to prevent it from becoming unsupported abandonware. The project and its source code are hosted (since start of 2016) under the MIT license on GitHub. The latest released freeware binary program was Dark Basic Pro Binary 120216 (2 December 2016), which included the activation of many previously commercial modules.

=== The 3D Gamemaker ===
The 3D Gamemaker is a computer application developed by The Game Creators that allows users to make various genres of 3D games for Microsoft Windows. The tool is marketed as allowing users to create 3D games without programming and art skills. Games developed with 3D Gamemaker require at least a 400 MHz Pentium processor, 64 MiB of RAM and DirectX 7.0b to run. Alongside the full boxed release, The 3D Gamemaker was also released in a Lite edition, with fewer categories of assets available and a reduced feature set.

The software has a simple point-and-click interface which guides the user through the process of creating the game. The user chooses a scene from one of several different genres ("shooter", "horror", "war", "space", "driving", "jungle", "cartoon", or "silly"), and then chooses different characters, weapons, items, enemies and so on. The software includes hundreds of pre-made scenes and 3D objects. The software can also automatically generate a game by choosing random elements. The resulting game can be exported as a standalone Windows executable. The 3D Gamemaker has a built-in placement editor that allows the user to indicate where enemies, items, and obstacles go. This is not available in beginner mode or the lite edition. There is also, among other things, a simple level creator. It also includes the ability to import the user's own media.

Reviewing The 3D Gamemaker for GameSpy, Tricia Harris praised the software's ease-of-use but criticized the animation and "placement editor" systems.

=== FPS Creator Classic ===
FPS Creator (also known as FPSC) was created in 2005 and has a 3D editor with drag-and-drop controls to place elements like walls, doors, enemies, and weapons. It also used custom scripts to control nearly every aspect of the game, from enemy AI to how doors opened. FPS Creator was popular with users, who enjoyed making their own games. It had a significant impact on the indie development scene in the 2000s.

In February 2016 The Game Creators decided to open-source "FPS Creator" as "FPS Creator Classic" and make the engine free for the public. Along with many 3D model packs on github.com.

=== FPS Creator x10 ===
As of 2013, FPS Creator x10 was officially discontinued due to its dependency on Windows Vista.

=== AppGameKit Classic ===
AppGameKit offers a high level coding and programming tool which aims to be easy for beginners to learn, featuring AGK Script which evolves the DarkBASIC language. In July 2016, AppGameKit Education Pack was released. AppGameKit was featured in Develop-Online's top 16 game engines of 2014. In December 2018 the app Driving Theory Test Kit 4in1 (built-in AppGameKit by TheGameCreators) was cited by Apple as their top paid-for app in 2018. The Driving Theory Test 4in1 Kit app has been named by Apple as its #1 top paid for app for the last three years (2018, 2019 and 2020). The scripting language of AppGameKit remains one of the easiest to learn.

=== AppGameKit Studio ===
AppGameKit Studio was launched in July 2019 as their fully featured game development tool. It has an all-in-one workspace and a re-imagining of the game and app development user interface and works cross-platform. AppGameKit Studio offers the user everything needed to take an idea from initial concept right through to the finished game. The scripting language is the same as the classic version but the graphics have been renewed

=== Game Guru Classic ===
In 2012, The Game Creators set up a Kickstarter campaign to create a successor game engine to FPS Creator; calling the new project FPS Creator Reloaded. While the Kickstarter campaign failed to meet its $75,000+ USD goal; The project continued development with funding from private donors and internal "pledges" from their community members. In 2013, before arriving on Steam, FPS Creator Reloaded was renamed Game Guru.

Game Guru brands itself as an "easy game maker" with "no coding experience required" and comes featured with a built-in terrain editor and multiplayer capabilities using the Steam network. The engine has been renamed a second time to "Game Guru Classic" and is available via Steam.

=== GameGuru Max ===
In 2019 The Game Creators launched the Alpha version of GameGuru MAX, the successor to GameGuru Classic. GameGuru MAX is in development and was launched on 25 March 2022, but it is still in an early access state. Game Guru Max currently has mixed reception on Steam.
