= Jumpgate: The Reconstruction Initiative =

2001 video game

- Developer(s): NetDevil
- Publisher(s): 3DO
- Platform(s): Microsoft Windows
- Release: WW: September 26, 2001
- Genre(s): MMOG/Space Simulation
- Mode(s): Multiplayer

Jumpgate: The Reconstruction Initiative (also Jumpgate or Jumpgate Classic and commonly abbreviated as JG or JGC) is a MMORPG in a science fiction setting for the PC, released in North America on September 26, 2001, by NetDevil (developer) and 3DO (publisher). However, only months after 3DO released the game to stores, their contract with NetDevil was broken or cancelled. NetDevil then hired Themis Group to provide technical support and provide in-game events.

German publisher Mightygames released a European version of Jumpgate in July 2001, and supported it until 1 June 2005. When Mightygames ceased operations, NetDevil worked with the GMs from Mightygames to transfer all non-banned accounts to the US server, which is now called the Worldwide Server. The remaining server was shut down on April 30, 2012.

In the game, jumpgates are used to travel from sector to sector. All sectors, without a station, consist of asteroids and a beacon. Many have Player Owned Stations and may have items related to events run by GMs. Station sectors all have a planet within the sector. The player is the pilot of a spacecraft, acquiring wealth and status by engaging in trade, mining, and/or combat. Players may work on their own or together as members of a collaborative squad. Players can upgrade their spacecraft in various ways, including adding weapons, engines, shields, and other modifications and upgrades.

== Factions ==
There are five factions within the universe of Jumpgate: The non-playable Amananth and Hyperial, and the three player factions of Octavius, Quantar, and Solrain.

== See also ==
- Jumpgate Evolution, another game by NetDevil using similar intellectual property
