= Universal Combat =

- Developer: 3000AD
- Publishers: DreamCatcher Interactive; 3000AD (freeware)
- Designer: Derek Smart
- Platform: Microsoft Windows
- Release: 2004: WW: 5 February 2004; WW: October 2005 (Gold); WW: August 3, 2005 (A World Apart); WW: 18 July 2006 (Special Edition); WW: 3 October 2007 (CE); WW: 2 January 2008 (freeware); WW: May 14, 2009 (CE v2.0)
- Genre: Space combat simulation
- Modes: Single-player, Multiplayer

Universal Combat (sometimes abbreviated to UC) is the second video game series by the developer 3000AD and is the successor of the Battlecruiser series of games.

== Gameplay ==
Universal Combat offers the player a very large game world to play in using varying forms of transport and combat. The player can pilot spaceships of varying sizes, as well as land on and explore planets. On land, they can drive varying land craft. The size of the playing area is seen as one of the game's main attractions, where traveling from place to place can take considerable quantities of time as there is no time compression. The game has a high learning curve that is daunting for newer players.

Every crew member aboard the player ship is tracked in location, hunger, AI level, and fatigue. Every system on board the player's starship can be monitored and controlled. In order for the player to fly a shuttle, they must first take time to walk through the ship to the shuttle bay, forcing the player to plan ahead for tactical encounters.

== Development ==
The project began as early as 2000 when Derek Smart announced that he had licensed Croteam's Serious Sam game engine for "Project ABC", for "After Battlecruiser", as replacement for the Battlecruiser Tactical Engagement add-on module intended for Battlecruiser Millennium. The game's scheduled release date was in late 2001, developed for PC and Xbox.

Development started in late 2001 as Battlecruiser Generations, the 5th game in the Battlecruiser series. As part of its design, the upcoming game was intended to make use of newer technology. With a new publisher, DreamCatcher Games, on board and offering more oversight, the direction of the game changed towards more action-based gameplay than the Battlecruiser series had previously been known for. The changes warranted a new title, and the name was changed to Universal Combat.

Universal Combat was not ready in time for the 2003 holidays, despite expectations. It was shipped in early 2004 by the publisher, DreamCatcher Interactive, at half of the originally announced price. Smart pursued legal action against his publisher. A cease and desist letter was issued on behalf of 3000AD to DreamCatcher alleging, among other things, that the price reduction was "clearly calculated to inflict economic harm on 3000AD". In the hearing, DreamCatcher Interactive claimed that the game's quality did not justify a midrange price, citing the graphics as an example of the overall quality of the game. A hearing was held to determine if DreamCatcher would be prevented from shipping the title at the reduced price. The presiding judge denied the injunction, stating that 3000AD "made bold but unsupported assertions regarding the irreparable harm to it", allowing DreamCatcher Interactive to ship the game and 3000AD to proceed with their lawsuit. The matter was later settled out of court under undisclosed terms.

In 2005, 3000AD, Inc. also announced termination of DreamCatcher's publishing right for Universal Combat, but the deal expired on 18 December 2007.

When 3000AD announced they would release the game as freeware, the company reported it had told DreamCatcher to initiate a DIF (Destroy in Field) order to its various retailers so that the remaining copies can no longer be sold, and any unsold copies would be filed as losses in Q4 2007.

== Games in the series ==
Title	Released	Publisher
Universal Combat	2004	DreamCatcher Games
Universal Combat Gold	2005	3000AD
Universal Combat: A World Apart	2005	3000AD
Universal Combat: Special Edition	2006	3000AD
Universal Combat: Collectors Edition	2007	3000AD

=== Universal Combat Gold ===
After terminating a publishing deal with DreamCatcher Interactive, Smart released an updated release titled Universal Combat Gold. Starting with this release, Smart has made a policy of releasing games through online resellers.

In 2005, Turner Broadcasting licensed both Battlecruiser Millennium and Universal Combat Gold for their games-on-demand system, GameTap.

Full localization supports Russian, French, Italian, German, and Spanish languages. Additional custom language interfaces are possible.

=== Universal Combat – A World Apart ===
Universal Combat – A World Apart is a sequel to the original Universal Combat games.

The game was originally announced on 18 November 2004 as an expansion pack for Universal Combat, which would feature newer and more advanced technologies found in the then-upcoming Universal Combat – Hostile Intent and Galactic Command Online.

DreamCatcher Interactive originally announced the publication of Universal Combat: A World Apart in May 2005, but several issues with the publisher (DreamCatcher) held up the boxed retail release of the title, and led to the termination of the publishing agreement. As a result, the publishing rights reverted to 3000AD Inc.

As a result of the termination, the boxed version of the game was not released, and the developer also removed DreamCatcher-created content from the retail game.

Although the game had switched to DirectX 9, graphics improvements only began in this edition. The audio engine was also based on FMOD, starting in the v1.00.11 patch.

=== Universal Combat Special Edition ===
A compilation release that includes all previous Universal Combat games, plus all outstanding updates and fixes.

Terrain rendering engine now uses improved texturing technologies such as high resolution textures support, reflections, volumetric clouds. Multiplayer and audio engine are also improved.

New scenarios include:

- 1 new 16-mission Advanced Campaign Mode scenario (A World Apart Episode 2) playable from the perspective of the Commander and Elite Force Pilot careers. The scenario storylines are a continuation of the Episode 1 storyline from the original UCAWA game.
- 8 new Instant Action scenarios featuring several career modes.

Total scenarios now 58 Instant Action scenarios, 5 Campaign Mode scenarios ('A Fragile Hope', playable from the perspective of the Commander career; 'Way of the Titans', playable from the perspective of the Commander and Elite Force Pilot careers; 'A World Apart : Episode 1', playable from the perspective of the Commander and Elite Force Pilot careers; 'A World Apart Episode 2', playable from the perspective of the Commander and Elite Force Pilot careers).

In addition to the standalone title, a version exists as expansion pack to the Universal Combat – A World Apart game, which only works with Direct2Drive version of the game.

=== Universal Combat Collectors' Edition ===
In December 2006, Smart announced a collectors' edition consisting of his Battlecruiser and Universal Combat games.

The Collectors' Edition consists of a compilation that includes all previously published Universal Combat and Battlecruiser games running on improved versions of the Universal Combat Special Edition game engine. Unlike previous releases, it is distributed via DVD, and Windows 98 and 2000 are no longer supported.

Universal Combat Collectors' Edition v2.0 is an updated version Collectors' Edition, that uses game engine from Galactic Command: Echo Squad Second Edition. Multiplayer support is no longer functional. A free upgrade to v2.0 was available for existing owners of Collectors' Edition until 1 January 2010.

=== Cancelled releases ===
- Universal Combat – Hostile Intent: Also called Hostile Intent – Planetfall, it is a combat-focused action game based on an improved version of the Universal Combat game engines. It represents the company's intent to split off the Universal Combat brand as an action-focused franchise which takes place in the established game world. On 25 January 2006, 3000AD announced Hostile Intent – Planetfall to be available on Xbox 360, with a projected release of Q1 of 2008. However, during the game's development, it evolved to become part of the Galactic Command series.
- Universal Combat – Hold the Line: It would be the second Universal Combat game focused on action, but much larger and advanced than Universal Combat – Hostile Intent. It would be sold as expansion to Universal Combat or a boxed title (which would also include the original game).
- Universal Combat – Edge to Edge: It is an announced standalone space and planetary squad-based multiplayer tactical combat game. The game would feature a much smaller world (2 space regions and 4 planets), with a graphics update. Single player mode would feature a single campaign between the Terran military player and insurgent counterparts.

== Reception ==
The game was reviewed and rated in several print and online game magazines. Metacritic gave it an aggregate review score of 54%. GameSpot scored it 59% and said "This wildly ambitious simulation is torpedoed by an almost incomprehensible interface, the absence of a tutorial, numerous bugs, and many fit and finish issues, including dated production values." Universal Combat was criticized for an unfamiliar interface and voluminous documentation (a manual of over 100 pages, 200-page downloadable appendix, and 80-page downloadable tutorial).

Universal Combat – A World Apart was rated 54% by GameRankings and 48% by Metacritic.
