= Vendetta Online =

2004 video game

- Vendetta Online box cover
- Developer: Guild Software
- Publishers: Strategy First (original retail); Guild Software (current)
- Designer: John Bergman
- Platforms: Microsoft Windows, OS X, iOS, Linux, Android, Ouya, Oculus Rift, Gear VR, Daydream, Oculus Go
- Release: NA: November 4, 2004
- Genres: Massively multiplayer online role-playing, space trading and combat simulator
- Mode: Multiplayer

Vendetta Online is a twitch-based, science fiction massively multiplayer online role-playing game (MMORPG) developed by Guild Software for the operating systems Android, Linux, Mac OS X, iOS, and Microsoft Windows. It uses the NAOS game engine, a fully real-time flight model and combat system, to offer first-person/third-person shooter-style player versus player and player versus environment battle action against the backdrop of a massively multiplayer universe. Vendetta Online shipped as a commercial MMORPG in November 2004 with a subscription-based business model, although it has been running continuously since April 2002. Vendetta Online is available to play across a wide array of platforms, including the Oculus Rift virtual reality display, allowing all users to directly interact in a single, contiguous galaxy. It is also notable for its twitch combat and fidelity to real physics.

== Gameplay ==
The twitch gameplay in Vendetta Online revolves around lining up a correct shot against enemy ships, while avoiding incoming fire. The dynamics of this can be complex, as ships are moving through 3D space, and the weapons fire itself has a specific velocity, modified by the ships' absolute velocity. The ships mostly obey the laws of Newtonian mechanics although a few artificial limits are put in place to increase the playability of the game. The control scheme includes a full six degrees of freedom, allowing users to assign keys or control axes (via joystick, thumb-stick, throttle, accelerometer, or touch area) to yaw, pitch, roll, and thrust along three axes. Ships can also be controlled with the mouse and keyboard using "mouselook" mode, in which the direction of view is controlled by the mouse and the ship's nose auto-corrects to catch up. Ships each have detailed specifications such as mass, thrust, torque, cargo capacity, top speed, turbo energy drain, armor, and weapon ports. There are also many variants of the main ship types, some holding certain advantages over others, with some advanced variants belonging to special factions. Depending on what equipment is being used, and what is carried in the cargo hold, the mass of the ship (and consequently maneuverability) will change greatly, affecting combat.

=== Weaponry ===
A first-person view of Vendetta Online's head-up display (HUD)

There are a wide variety of weapons in Vendetta Online, some requiring energy to fire, others relying on ammunition, proximity fuzes, target tracking, or some combination thereof. As most weapons have a cone of fire assisted by autoaim, effectively deploying weaponry relies less on careful aiming than it does on managing the ship's momentum, energy, attitude and distance to target. Knowledge of combat proves an effective tool, as a veteran pilot flying mediocre equipment will often defeat a less experienced pilot using superior equipment, by virtue of tactics alone. However, certain weapons do require careful aiming, such as railguns. Weapons may cause the target ship to be displaced, or to spin through concussive force. Weapons may also hit a target that has not been selected, or hit an unintended target or friendly ship.

=== Factions ===
In Vendetta Online, there are three playable nations and many minor factions. The nations are the Itani Nation, the Serco Dominion, and the Union of Independent Territories (usually referred to as the UIT). The Itani are reputed for their science and maneuverable ships, the Serco for their warrior nature and armored ships, and the UIT for their trading abilities and neutrality. Choosing which nation to play affects initial faction standings, and which missions will later become available.

=== Licenses and faction standing ===
Vendetta Online uses a five-category license system in which players earn experience toward different licenses by participating in different avenues of gameplay. For example, to earn a better trade license a player may trade commodities between stations for profit or take missions from the local trade guild. As a player's licenses improve, different ships and equipment may become available to purchase and various types of missions appear. The player's standing in the current faction that controls the space around them also affects what opportunities may be afforded them. Faction standing can be gained or lost through missions or by destroying ships of various alignment.

=== Long-term objectives ===
As the player progresses in licenses and faction, certain large-scale goals become available. The player may take part in the war against the Hive, an ever-expanding race of NPC Robots, vying for control of areas of space containing asteroids rich in valuable minerals. By banding together with other players, they may take down powerful enemies such as the Hive Queen or Leviathan, affecting Hive activities across many systems. The player may also join the military and take part in large scale conflict between the Serco and the Itani.

- Conquerable Stations - Several conquerable stations are scattered across unclaimed systems on the outskirts of national territory (an area known as Greyspace). Controlling these stations allows players to manufacture unique items and weaponry. Conquering a station involves destroying all of the station's defensive turrets within a timed window of opportunity. Once all turrets have been destroyed, a short timer is triggered at the end of which the first player to dock with the station is given an access key, which may then be provided to allies. Whenever a conquerable station comes under attack, any player with a key is sent a message, allowing them to organize a defense or a counter-attack.
- Capture the Cargo (CtC) - Serco and Itani convoys depart hourly from within Greyspace, bound for their respective national territories. These convoys carry a valuable good known as Purified Xithricite Ore, which cannot be found elsewhere in the game. Players can lie in wait along the convoy routes and ambush the ships, picking up the ore and redirecting it to their own nation. At the end of each week the ore is tallied, and players belonging to the winning nation are given access to a special weapon. The losing nation is able to keep 20% of the ore that was collected as a surplus, the winning nation begins with nothing. UIT players are able to help either side as they see fit.
- Race Tracks - There are a series of racetracks in Greyspace that record player top times. The racetracks are in the form of tubes, with certain segments transparent and certain segments opaque, presenting a visual hazard. Some tracks include branching tubes, allowing multiple courses through a single track. Players may take damage by colliding with the tube walls at high speed, challenging them to find the best line through each track while avoiding the tube walls. There are checkpoints along the way that allow the player to gauge his or her lap time. At the end of every month an achievement badge is awarded to any player holding a top time on any track.
- Deneb War - Players belonging to either the Itani or the Serco military are able to engage in battles along the border between the nations. Depending on the outcome of each battle, territory may be claimed for either nation. Battles range in size from small fighter skirmishes to large battles between fleets of opposing capital ships. War convoys are sent out daily to blockade the entrance to the losing nation from Greyspace. This affects convoys carrying Purified Xithricite Ore, as the convoy route lies along the area that is blockaded.

=== Manufacturing ===
In June 2009, the game acquired the ability for several players to serve as crew together on one ship. Two years later in June 2011, a guild of players finished construction of Vendetta Online's first player-owned capital ship. Player-owned capships are constructed through a series of manufacturing missions, in which the player delivers a list of necessary materials to the station, and receives the resulting components. The components are assembled through a final mission at a hidden capital shipyard station.

Various weapons, addons, and fighter class ships may be assembled through manufacturing missions as well. Most manufactured items hold some benefit over regularly purchased items. Material elements used in manufacturing are often scarce, including rare ore and unique items dropped by Hive robots. Manufactured items, together with the rare ore and components used to create them, form a base leg of Vendetta Online's emerging player economy.

== Synopsis ==
A neon advertisement in Galactic Trade Standard.

=== Setting ===
Vendetta Online has a long backstory, which details the fate of humanity from 2140 to 4432. It was written by the lead game developer, John Bergman. The backstory is written from a historical perspective, from the viewpoint of an Itani monk chronicling the events leading to the galaxy's present state. It outlines drastic advances in the fields of medicine and biotechnology during political unrest and warfare on Earth, the discovery of a stable wormhole near Saturn leading to a solar system across the galaxy, and the subsequent exploration, colonization, and inadvertent exile humankind experiences as a result of the wormhole's collapse. The three national factions are described in great detail, including their origins, personality, and notable historical figures. Subterfuge, misunderstanding, and betrayal are common themes throughout the backstory.

=== Galactic Trade Standard ===
Galactic Trade Standard (GTS) is a fictional language unique to Vendetta Online. Similar to real-world East Asian languages, it includes both phonetic and symbolic alphabets. The phonetic alphabet is simplified to include major human sounds with few letters. The symbolic alphabet includes pictographic representations of objects and ideas relating to trade within Vendetta. The language was constructed to allow traders from foreign nations to communicate with one another easily, as certain nations spent centuries in isolation from each other before regaining contact. GTS can be found throughout the galaxy on projected neon signs outside of space stations, most often advertising goods and services but also sometimes including cryptic messages or humorous phrases.

== Development ==
Vendetta Online's development team is relatively small compared to many other titles in the same genre, at its largest including four people. The four original developers are John Bergman, Ray Ratelis, Andy Sloane, and Waylon Brinck. John Bergman remains the managing director and has invested much of his own personal finances into the project. The game is based in Milwaukee, Wisconsin and has been in development since 1998. In April 2002, the game opened with a public alpha test to prove the efficiency of the twitch style combat in the low bandwidth environment of that era. In November 2004, the game launched as a retail product, with the Linux mascot featured as part of the game box artwork. The retail-CD included Mac, Linux, and PC native versions of the game.

Since launch, the development team has maintained Mac, Linux, and PC support for the game, allowing users on all three platforms to play and interact in the same universe. In 2010, the developers announced that the game would be ported to Android devices, allowing mobile device users to play. In March 2011, the game became available on mobile devices with the Nvidia Tegra, making it the first true PC MMORPG to make the jump to mobile. In September 2011, Vendetta launched on the Xperia Play. By December 2011, the game was available on a number of Android phones, and in October 2012, it was launched for Windows mobile devices on Windows RT, becoming the first game to appear in both the Nvidia TegraZone market and the Windows Store. On April 17, 2013, Vendetta launched on iTunes for iOS devices including the iPad 2 and later. Vendetta was the only MMORPG available at launch on the Android-based Ouya console, and continues to be accessible from the Ouya store. On July 24, 2013, Vendetta officially launched support for the Oculus Rift family of devices, marking the first time a live MMORPG supported the virtual reality display. On October 20, 2016, Vendetta launched for Samsung Gear VR, UploadVR noting it as "the most ambitious space shooter on Gear VR so far". On March 30, 2017, Vendetta launched for Google Daydream VR. On September 21, 2017, Vendetta officially launched for iPhone. On June 9, 2018, Vendetta launched for Oculus Go.

Users on all platforms are fed into the same, contiguous galaxy, where they can directly interact. The gameplay itself has been described as "device agnostic", meaning that users are able to approach the game with an even level of parity across platforms, and are blind to what platform other players with whom they are interacting are using. In general, the development team has a good relationship with the Vendetta Online user-base, often stopping to play online along with subscribed users and responding to user comments, questions and suggestions.

=== Player Contribution Corps ===
The PCC (Player Contribution Corps) is a hand-picked group of players that creates content for the game (mainly missions). These players use an in-house developed browser-based mission editor and submit their content to a publicly accessible test server. There the mission can be tested by anyone, and commented on. The mission can then be resubmitted, based on new suggestions. Typically, this process requires several months or more for a mission tree to be brought up to standard and implemented.

The PCC is a separate group from the remainder of the player base as an additional emphasis on "Trust, Maturity, Involvement and English" is expected of them. This is in part to ensure that the PCC remains a productive and collaborative environment that continues to produce high-quality content. The PCC is also responsible for helping design Lua code for the game's User Interface, and testing new equipment before it becomes widely available. The PCC remains an innovative development on the MMO scene, bridging the gap between "sandbox" style player-contributed content and traditional top-down corporate game design, generated in a method reminiscent of Lucas' 'Expanded Universe'.

== Reception ==
Reception

Aggregate scores
Aggregator	Score
GameRankings	70.00%
Metacritic	62%

Review scores
Publication	Score
GameSpot	7.1/10 stars
IGN	6.5/10 stars
MacLife	3/5 stars
148 Apps	4/5 stars
CNET	4/5 stars

Upon initial release, Vendetta Online received mixed reviews. GameSpot's 2005 review rated Vendetta as "good", highlighting the novel twitch-based space combat, and a successful implementation of multiplayer space trading and combat gameplay. However, it was felt that the limited content did not justify the subscription value, and the ship designs were deemed to be uninspiring. A more recent review by Kotaku stated that Vendetta was "a deep game with an intuitive interface" taking note of the port to Android mobile devices. Macworld called Vendetta "a brilliant online gaming experience, clearly influenced by classic space games Elite and Frontier". Joystiq praised Vendetta's development saying "For active developer participation, Vendetta Online definitely runs near the head of the pack and might even lead it". In January 2013, Darrell Etherington of TechCrunch named Vendetta "The Most Multiplatform MMO Game Ever".
