= Star Quest 1 in the 27th century =

1995 video game

- Developer: Virtual Adventures
- Publisher: Virtual Adventures
- Platform: MS-DOS
- Release: 5 November 1995
- Genre: Space combat simulation

Star Quest 1 in the 27th century is a 3D space combat simulation video game for MS-DOS developed by Virtual Adventures and released in 1995.

== Gameplay ==
The player takes the role of a volunteer pilot and completes various missions which include direct fighting, protecting ally ships and surface structures, commanding wingman attack formations, and participating in friendly space races against other pilots. As the player completes more missions, ship upgrades (like better engines and weapons) become available, and new missions are unlocked.

== Development ==
The game was developed by Virtual Adventures, a Canadian developer. It was founded in November 1994, headquartered in Quebec, Canada with a vision to build itself as an independent video games developer company since its establishment and to be popular to the game lovers.

A sequel, to be titled Star Quest 2: United Galaxies, was being developed, and planned to feature 3D real-time strategic multiplayer action. A Kickstarter campaign was launched to fund the development of the sequel, but was unsuccessful in reaching its goal. Only $1,167 out of $22,448 was pledged to the Kickstarter, leading to the end of the sequel's campaign on December 26, 2013. As of 2024, the sequel is still under development and news of its progress is posted on the developer web page.

In December 2025, designer Paul Lauzon updated the space combat sim so that it works on modern machines and re-released it on Itch at no charge.

== Reception ==
The game received generally favorable reviews from contemporary publications. PC Answers rated the game 73%, criticizing the lack of innovation and its "horrendous techno music", but nonetheless saying it is "an enjoyable shooter with a good variety of missions". Atout Micro, a Quebec-based publication, reviewed the game and concluded it was "a nice local product".

Star Quest 1 was included on PC Games's August 1996 demo CD. The game was consistently ranked amongst the "Top 40 Most Popular Games in the World" throughout 1996, as published by PC Games Chart.
