= Star Wraith: Shadows of Orion =

Video game

- Developer: StarWraith 3D Games
- Publisher: StarWraith 3D Games
- Series: Star Wraith
- Release: September 1, 2002

Star Wraith: Shadows of Orion (also known as Star Wraith III or Star Wraith 3) is the third game in the Star Wraith series developed by StarWraith 3D Games LLC. It is the successor of Star Wraith II. Star Wraith IV: Reviction is the successor to Star Wraith III.

It is now freeware.

== Gameplay ==
Star Wraith III is a 3D space combat simulator for Windows.

Although the story is very similar to the game's predecessors, Star Wraith and Star Wraith II, the game deviates slightly from the conflict between the Alliance and the Federation. Instead, the main focus of the story is on a mysterious alien race (later known to be called the Vonari) whose ships appear out of nowhere and have the power to annihilate Alliance and Federation flagships in mere seconds.

Unlike Star Wraith II, which sported a linear campaign, Star Wraith III features a "dynamic" campaign. Before each "mission" (level), the player is given a choice between 2-3 different missions. The next level is then chosen based on which mission was selected; if the right mission is selected (i.e. the mission which helps the Alliance the most), then the game advances to the next selection of missions. If a wrong mission is selected, however, the player is then required to complete a penalty mission which is usually harder than the main missions.

Arguably the biggest improvement in Star Wraith III is the addition of online multiplayer. This allows players to connect and play various combat scenarios such as dogfight and team vs. team.

Star Wraith III also allows players to choose between four ships with distinct advantages and disadvantages (which were introduced in the mercenary mode of Star Wraith II).

== Reception ==
Star Wraith III did not attract much attention from major reviewers, but reviews have been mostly positive.

CNET.com gave the game 4 out of 5 stars, citing the game's graphics and difficulty as strong points, while citing the short length of the trial version as a major weak point.

Game Tunnel gave Star Wraith III a much more extensive review, giving the game an overall score of 9/10. This review praised the game for its graphics, simple gameplay, and replay value, but criticized it for its lack of cinematics and weak story. In-game voices were also criticized for being "a little on the cheezy side".
