= NetDevil =

American video game developer

NetDevil Ltd.
- Logo of NetDevil until 2010
- Company type: Private
- Industry: Video games
- Founded: 1997
- Defunct: February 25, 2011
- Fate: Bankruptcy
- Headquarters: Louisville, Colorado, United States
- Products: Jumpgate, Auto Assault, Warmonger, Lego Universe, Jumpgate Evolution
- Number of employees: 75
- Website: netdevil.com

NetDevil Ltd. was an American developer of massively multiplayer online games, based in Louisville, Colorado and owned by Gazillion Entertainment.

== History ==
=== Beginnings ===
NetDevil was founded in 1997 by Scott Brown, Peter Grundy and Steven Williams in Louisville, a suburb north of Denver, Colorado. Before forming NetDevil, Brown, Grundy, and Williams worked at Digital Creators, an information technology firm located in Boulder, Colorado. The three dreamed of being creators of their own digital worlds, and began developing Jumpgate, a space-based flight simulator MMO, during their spare evenings and weekends. After a year of part-time work, they quit their jobs and started NetDevil, headquartered in the basement of Scott Brown's home. Their first proper office was 750 square feet (70 m^{2}), sub-leased from friends with another technology company. In an interview with GameDaily, Scott Brown shared that at one point they had fourteen people packed into one big room.

According to the company's website, the name NetDevil was chosen because of the "owners' obsession with cool scary things that live in the deep dark waters of the world". All of the company's principals are certified SCUBA divers, including one certified dive master.

=== New location ===
In June 2007, NetDevil announced that they had completed moving into their new location in Louisville, Colorado, a nearly 30,000 sq ft (2,800 m^{2}) office facility which includes a professional sound studio, user testing facility and LEGO model shop. To celebrate their 10th anniversary, they hosted a party at their new location.

=== Acquisition by Gazillion Entertainment ===
In July 2008, NetDevil was purchased by game publisher Gazillion Entertainment, though this was not made public until March 2009.

=== Departures of founders ===
In the last months of 2010, all remaining founders of NetDevil, notably Scott Brown, Peter Grundy, and Ryan Seabury, who headed the LEGO Universe team, chose to leave the company. Brown and Seabury started End Games Entertainment, whose first product is a Facebook game titled Vorp!

=== Layoffs ===
In February 2011, two rounds of layoffs took place at the NetDevil studio. The first round eliminated the Jumpgate Evolution development team. The second downsized the LEGO Universe team and appears to be part of a deal in which Gazillion passed control of development of LEGO Universe to the LEGO Group. This was an effect of the slow failure of LEGO Universe.

== Products ==
=== Released ===
Jumpgate (2001) – A massively multiplayer online flight simulator set in space. Though it was initially published by 3DO, NetDevil regained control of the game in 2002, due to 3DO's bankruptcy. Jumpgate was shut down on April 30, 2012. Although the player community has expressed interest in acquiring the source code for Jumpgate, Gazillion has, at this time, not made it available.

Auto Assault (2006) – A massively multiplayer online game that combined vehicular combat with role-playing elements, allowing the player to explore a post-apocalyptic future in customizable cars, motorcycles, semis, and tanks. It was published by NCsoft, and shut down in 2007.

Warmonger: Operation Downtown Destruction (2007) – An apocalyptic, first-person shooter (FPS), built around the AGEIA PhysX processor with Unreal Engine 3. It featured a piece-by-piece destruction system and fluid and cloth-based effects.

Lego Universe (2010) – A children's MMO product in which LEGO minifigures join the Nexus Force, to defeat the Maelstrom. LEGO Universe development largely supported NetDevil from 2007 until the studio was closed by Gazillion and control of the product released to LEGO, and shut down in 2012.

=== In development ===
Jumpgate Evolution – In June 2007, NetDevil announced plans for Jumpgate Evolution, a remake of NetDevil's first project, the classic MMO Jumpgate. The space-based title was planned to receive a massive graphical revamp, along with many new features. In December 2007, NetDevil announced the launch of a website for Jumpgate Evolution containing backstory written by Keith Baker, in-game footage, screenshots and video, community forums, and a fan site kit available for download. This project was cancelled with the layoff of the development team in February 2011.
