= Galactic Command =

- Genre: Space combat simulator
- Developer: 3000AD
- Publishers: 3000AD, GameTap
- Platforms: Microsoft Windows, Xbox 360
- First release: Galactic Command - Echo Squad; 2007
- Latest release: Galactic Command Online

Galactic Command (GALCOM for short) is the third series of space exploration video games developed by 3000AD, Inc.

Unlike the previous series, this game is targeted specifically for the casual/action fan, with advertised 'very low learning curve'. Elements such as trading, diplomacy, pointless exploration from the previous series were stripped away for the AIP (Acquire, Identify, Prosecute) compliant gameplay experience.

Missions include recon, search & destroy, combat air patrol, escort, tactical support and other variants.

== Galactic Command - Echo Squad ==
Galactic Command - Echo Squad
- Developer: 3000AD
- Publisher: GameTap
- Designer: Derek Smart
- Series: Galactic Command
- Platform: Windows XP SP2
- Release: 2007 Q2 (planned)
- Genre: Space combat simulator
- Modes: Single player, Multiplayer (max 16)

On February 6, 2007, Turner Broadcasting, the owner of Gametap who licenses several of Smart's back catalog of titles, announced at the D.I.C.E summit that it had signed an exclusive agreement with Smart to bring the first Galactic Command title, Echo Squad, exclusively to its Gametap subscription service in the Spring as an original episodic series. Gametap did not release the game to their subscribers as originally planned and, according to Gamasutra, cancelled their publishing deal. In discussing the deal's cancellation Rick Sanchez, GameTap VP of Content said "I think it's one of the strongest games [Derek] ever made" but that "We could put a lot of promos behind it, but it wouldn't resonate too strongly with our audience"

The published game would have been sold as 4 separate episodes, with 16 missions for each episode.

Game map includes galaxy with 8 star systems, approximately 50 planets and moons with several containing populated areas. There are over 50 space crafts.

=== Development ===
In 2006–12, Smart announced Galactic Command, a new franchise title.

== Galactic Command - Echo Squad Second Edition ==
Galactic Command - Echo Squad Second Edition
- Developer: 3000AD
- Publisher: 3000AD
- Designer: Derek Smart
- Series: Galactic Command
- Platform: Windows XP SP2
- Release: 2008-03-07 2008-03-11 (demo) 2014-03-09 (Steam version)
- Genre: Space combat simulator
- Modes: Single player, Multiplayer (max 32)

Following the cancellation of the original Echo Squad, the cancelled game was released commercially in Second Edition. Although episodic had originally been planned from the first edition, the distribution only began in this edition.

The game includes voice narrated in-game tutorial. It also advertised support of wide screen resolutions.

=== Episodes ===
- Episode 1: Rise Of The Insurgents
- Episode 2: The Excalibur Gambit
- Episode 3: Lost Echo
- Episode 4: The War Within

The full game includes Episode 1, with additional games sold separately. Upon completing a campaign, freeform gameplay mode is unlocked.

=== Downloadable contents ===
- The Insurgent Incursion Scenario (2008-04-21, free): The Instant Action scenario is a heavily revised version of the active duty combat scenario which appears at the end of the tutorial.
- Combat Action Pack (2009-09-10, free): Contains The Insurgent Incursion Scenario, and 3 playable fighters in single player game (INTERCEPTOR MK1 Heavy Fighter, STARMONK Light Fighter, VANDAL Super Fighter), 3 Scenarios (RISE OF THE INSURGENTS with Interceptor MK1 Heavy Fighter/Starmonk Light Fighter/Vandal Super Fighter, THE INSURGENT INCURSION with Starlance Medium Fighter/Interceptor MK1 Heavy Fighter/Starmonk Light Fighter/Vandal Super Fighter, FREEFORM SANDBOX with Starlance Medium Fighter/Interceptor MK1 Heavy Fighter/Starmonk Light Fighter/Vandal Super Fighter).

== Galactic Command - Talon Elite ==
Galactic Command - Talon Elite
- Developer: 3000AD
- Designer: Derek Smart
- Series: Galactic Command
- Engine: Planetary Terrain Engine (PTE Spec V)
- Platform: Xbox 360
- Genre: Space combat simulator

It is the company's first game for consoles, based on the Echo Squad Second Edition, with unique features and scenarios.

=== Development ===
On 2007-05-16, 3000AD announced Galactic Command — Talon Elite., the second title in the new series. In a statement on 17 December, Smart set a release date of the late 2008 for the Xbox 360, with the PC version coming thereafter.

== Galactic Command - KnightBlade ==
Galactic Command - KnightBlade
- Developer: 3000AD
- Designer: Derek Smart
- Series: Galactic Command
- Platforms: PC, Xbox 360
- Genre: Space combat simulator

It is an announced title for the series. It also followed the episodic formula in Echo Squad.

=== Episodes ===
- Episode 1: First Strike

=== Development ===
The game was originally called KnightBlade – Final Flight (also called KnightBlade - Line Of Defense, Galactic Command - Excalibur), a title originally announced in 2004. This game was originally started as a project for the Xbox, but was eventually put into production for the more powerful Xbox 360 game system. The original game had a release date of 2005 Q3 when it was pushed back.

On 2006-01-25, 3000AD announced KnightBlade - Line Of Defense for Xbox 360, with projected release in Q1 of 2008. However, the project was delayed to 2010.

== Galactic Command - Bravo Team ==
Galactic Command - Bravo Team
- Developer: 3000AD
- Designer: Derek Smart
- Series: Galactic Command
- Engine: SpeedTree RT (vegetation)
- Genre: first-person shooter

It is an announced first-person shooter title based on the adventures of a team of elite marines assigned to a planetary starbase. It is also sold in episodic format.

Player can choose between Mobile Infantry Marine or Elite Force Marine career.

=== Development ===
On 2007-03-19, 3000AD announced Galactic Command — Bravo Team, an episodic first-person shooter title. The title is currently scheduled for release in 2009.

== Galactic Command Online ==
Originally titled Universal Combat Online, it is a massive multiplayer online game. The new name was used when the developer decided it had sufficiently large update over Universal Combat.

The game remains combat focused and trading is restricted to the Trader caste only. However, with access to a starbase or starstation, player's ship is repaired and rearmed for free.

When driving space craft, player cannot move around within the ship. However, full first person perspective is available for all characters. First person HUD has been re-designed with a less cluttered and minimalist approach, which could be seen in the Bravo Team game.

Player can choose all the careers paths in the previous Battlecruiser and Universal Combat series, which include Commander, Elite Force Pilot, Planetary Support Pilot, Elite Force Marine, Mobile Infantry Marine, Assault Force Marine, Recon Force Marine, Space Force Marine, Engineering Corps Marine, Medical Corps Marine. However, player is restricted to 1 career per profile. To be a Commander, Player starts career as Elite Force Pilot, and earns Experience Points by competing against rival player or NPC units. Commander's assigned task is based on player's caste, which also affects Commander's starting space craft. Career types also affects the type of space craft available to player.

=== Development ===
The game was originally announced in 2000 as one of the final games in the Battlecruiser series, along with Battlecruiser Millennium. GCO had the original release date of Q3 2001. In January 2011, the company confirmed that they were still working on the title.

== Reception ==
Reviews were mixed, praising the game for its ambition and scope but critical of the complex nonstandard user interface which is not customisable, elements of the design, and the steep learning curve. GameRankings listed an aggregate review score of 56%.
