= Battlecruiser 3000AD =

1996 video game

- European cover art
- Developer: 3000 AD
- Publishers: Battlecruiser 3000AD: NA: Take-Two Interactive; EU: GameTek; v2.0: NA: Interplay Entertainment; EU: GT Interactive; AU: Jack of All Games; Millennium; 3000 AD; Millennium Gold; DreamCatcher Interactive
- Designer: Derek K. Smart
- Platforms: MS-DOS, Windows
- Release: October 11, 1996: Battlecruiser 3000AD; NA: October 11, 1996; EU: March 7, 1997 23 February 1998 (freeware) v2.0; NA: 31 December 1998; EU: October 1999; AU: March 2000 17 July 2001 (freeware) Millennium; NA: 19 November 2001 20 May 2005 (freeware) Millennium Gold March 2003
- Genre: Space trading and combat simulator
- Modes: Single-player, multiplayer

Battlecruiser 3000AD is a space trading and combat simulator video game developed by 3000 AD. It was designed by 3000 AD president and lead developer Derek Smart as the studio's first project.

Announced in 1992, the game underwent a lengthy and troubled development history. It was first released against Smart's wishes in 1996 by publisher Take-Two Interactive for MS-DOS and Windows and negatively received for its incomplete nature. A patched version was later released for Windows by publisher Interplay Entertainment in 1998. Smart designed and self-published a sequel entitled Millennium, which was released in 2001, and an updated version was released by publisher DreamCatcher Interactive in 2003. A compilation pack entitled Battlecruiser Generations, including both versions of 3000AD and Millennium, was released in 2021 on Steam.

== Story ==
The game takes place in the year 3000 AD, centuries after mankind has developed advanced spacecraft, and discovered new worlds and intelligent life-forms within and beyond the Solar System. However, space travel is described as restricted to military personnel and scientists despite its conveniences. The story goes on to describe an interplanetary war, started in 2041AD, with Earth involved. In 2044AD, Galactic Command (GALCOM) is formed to maintain law and order amongst planets. The Gammulan race opposes the alliance and war is waged between GALCOM and Gammulans.

The player takes the role of a recruit assigned to defend the GALCOM consortium of planets against Gammulans. The events of the game begin with GALCOM diplomatic craft developing a navigational malfunction and straying into Gammulan territory. GALCOM supreme commander Stranix reports a Sphinx class battlecruiser intentionally destroyed by a Gammulan orbital defence system, with no survivors; meanwhile, a team of Renegade class interceptors ambushes a Gammulan starfighter in GALCOM space.

== Gameplay ==
- Free Flight: Player freely cruises the galaxy and learns the large array of controls and computer interfaces without fear of attack by alien craft or pirates.
- Advanced Campaign Mode: In this mode the game is dynamic, and changes can occur rapidly and often through political and military influences.
- Xtreme Carnage Combat Simulator: It is a combat simulator that allows the player to gain experience in combat operations, both planetbound and in free flight.

== Development ==
Derek Smart began his game development career in the late 1980s, with a vision of creating an all-encompassing space simulation game, featuring strategy elements along with space, planetary, air and ground combat. According to Smart, he began work on Battlecruiser 3000AD in 1989. Smart became a notable personality in the video game world during the early 1990s, even before releasing his software debut. Smart became known to the then-nascent online gaming world through discussions taking place on Usenet about the game, his development efforts, and many other topics.

The game first appeared on the cover of Strategy Plus in 1992. A release date of April 1993 was announced. Shortly afterwards, Three-Sixty Pacific obtained the rights. It held the rights for a year and went out of business shortly afterwards. 3000AD, Inc. then signed the rights with Mission Studios. Mission Studios also signed a distribution deal with Interplay Productions for its products. The game was showcased in 1994 winter and 1994 summer in CES under the Interplay Affiliated label brand. However, due to financial constraints, an agreement was reached which allowed 3000AD, Inc. to seek a new publisher. Intracorp bid for the rights to publish the game; with a disagreement over source code release, the deal never progressed beyond a letter of intent. The game appeared in E3 1995, then Intracorp went bankrupt shortly afterwards. Take-Two Interactive bought the publishing rights to the game from Mission Studios in 1995, and released v1.00 of the game, with GameTek (UK) publishing the game in 1997.

In Take-Two Interactive's SEC filings on February 10, 1997, the company stated that Battlecruiser 3000AD accounted for 14.2% of revenue for the fiscal year ending October 31, 1996. The filing also stated that Take-Two Interactive "made advances in the aggregate amount of approximately $618,000" for the title.

== Versions ==
Title	Released	Publisher
Battlecruiser 3000AD (U.S.)	1996	Take-Two Interactive
Battlecruiser 3000AD (UK)	1997	GameTek
Battlecruiser 3000AD v2.0	1999	Interplay
Battlecruiser Millennium	2001	Dreamcatcher Games
Battlecruiser Millennium Gold	2003	3000 AD

=== Battlecruiser 3000AD v2.0 ===
Development of version 2.0 of the game continued throughout 1998, and Interplay announced that it would publish an improved version (dubbed Battlecruiser 3000AD v2.0) through its Value Product Division. Unlike the previous product, only a Windows version was supported.

3D acceleration is supported only through 3dfx hardware. The game now contains 13 alien races, 25 castes. The in-game map contains 25 star systems with 75 planets and 145 moons in total.

=== Battlecruiser Millennium ===
From 1998 to 2001, Smart developed his next game in the Battlecruiser franchise, Battlecruiser Millennium. The game was to be exclusively distributed at Electronics Boutique locations and was self-published by his company 3000AD, Inc. The deal made with EB was a first of its kind merchant exclusivity deal for a game's release, with an independent developer paying for all materials to publish the game for distribution through the retailer. When asked by the gaming media about his thoughts on the deal, Smart stated "I'm paying for everything. I bear all the risk. I pay for the cost of goods, including the boxes and manuals."

After its retail run, Smart released Battlecruiser Millennium on the Internet for free as he had done with his previous titles. He has mentioned that he intends to keep up this practice of releasing his products for free once their "shelf life" has expired.

=== Battlecruiser Millennium Gold ===
It is a version of Battlecruiser Millennium with complete updates. A client-server multiplayer engine is introduced in this version. Flight controls can now be done using a mouse.

Other new elements include:

- One new small galaxy containing 12 space regions, 12 planetary regions, 272 planetary mission zones and 1,086 planetary areas of interest (scenes). This galaxy does not include a map. All the new scenarios included in this game take place in this new galaxy. The full map now includes 152 space regions containing 238 planets, 4,033 planetary mission zones, 21,548 planetary areas of interest in total.
- 44 planetary starbases, 1,011 military bases and 13 star stations. The full map now includes 96 starbases, 14,408 military bases and 71 star stations in total.
- 20 new Instant Action scenarios with a variety of missions ranging from easy to extremely hard, which brings the total number of Instant Action scenarios to 45.
- One new ACM scenario (Broken Arrow?) with multi-branch scenarios which can either end up being 11 or 15 missions depending on the resolution of certain missions. In the GameStop exclusive version of the game, there is yet another ACM scenario. The total number of ACM scenarios is five depending on version.

The developer originally intended to introduce multiplayer feature when making the original Battlecruiser Millennium back in late 1999, but due to unforeseen circumstances, this feature was dropped in the initial product. The product was to use the RTIME Interactive Networking Engine.

When the game was redesigned, the developer discovered that the original design architecture of the game kernel prevented the implementation of multiplayer, so the game was redesigned. Further information about it was revealed in the Smart Speak section of the manual.

=== Cancelled releases ===
- Battlecruiser Commander - It is the working title for the sequel of Battlecruiser 3000AD.
- Battlecruiser 3020AD - It is the working title for the sequel of Battlecruiser 3000AD, to be released after Battlecruiser Millennium. The game would include an online multiplayer universe, and a first-person in-ship mode.
- BC3K: Strike Pak - This game allows the player to board, in a first-person perspective, ships targeted by the player. It was designed to be a standalone game or be linked to Battlecruiser Commander.
- BC3K: Skirmish Pak - This was intended to be a multiplayer addon to the Battlecruiser Commander, but the multiplayer feature had never been implemented until Battlecruiser Millennium Gold.
- Battlecruiser Tactical Engagement - It is an in-ship first-person perspective add-on module for Battlecruiser Millennium. That project was replaced by "Project ABC," for "After Battlecruiser," which later became Universal Combat. A prototype for the add-on was produced.
- Battlecruiser Online - It is a massively multiplayer online version of Battlecruiser Generations (later called Universal Combat), with an off-line single-player training component. However, neither Battlecruiser Online nor Universal Combat series have included games that feature persistent online worlds.

== Controversies ==
After publisher Take-Two Interactive released Battlecruiser 3000AD in September 1996, it generated one of the longest and largest flame wars in the history of Usenet. This flame war lasted for several years, garnered over 70,000 posts, and yielded a series of sites that documented and parodied its history.

Smart and Take-Two Interactive advertised that Battlecruiser 3000AD used a neural network to perform artificial intelligence tasks in the game. However, this claim has been criticised as highly improbable by other game designers. In one article in a computer games magazine, Keith Zabalaoui, former NASA programmer and one of the designers of the Close Combat series of strategy games, was quoted as saying, "I have a hard time believing it's in there... the concept of training [neural nets] to do the complex tasks required in a game is inconceivable. It's mumbo jumbo. I guarantee you that if there's a neural net that does anything in [BC3K] this man would be in the Computer Science Hall of fame."

Upon its initial release of Battlecruiser 3000AD, the game contained many bugs that made it unstable, according to a GameSpy.com reviewer, who asserted that "Smart consistently overrates his own products and his own abilities." For his part, Derek Smart claimed that the buggy release was the responsibility of Take-Two Interactive, who in turn said Smart was solely to blame. After the initial release, Smart issued several patches and upgrades for the product over the next few months, and eventually a final patch was released to fix some of the major bugs. In February 1998, after obtaining publishing rights from Take-Two Interactive, Smart released the game on the Internet for download free of charge.

Derek Smart filed a lawsuit against Take-Two Interactive (who also released the game in the UK through a sub-license deal with GameTek), alleging breach of contract. The lawsuit was later settled out of court, and both parties released statements of resolution in late 1998. Smart regained the rights to the game via the settlement. He continued to develop a new version through his personal company, 3000 AD.

Gametek promoted the game in the UK with a notorious print ad featuring model Joanne Guest wearing lingerie and straddling a copy of the game. THQ later ran a parody of the ad, featuring a fully dressed, matronly woman mimicking Guest's pose (down to her chewing on the same finger) and Battlecruiser 3000AD replaced by a sign with the THQ logo.

== Reception ==
Battlecruiser 3000AD was covered extensively in gaming magazines during the development process, including a 1992 cover story in Computer Games Strategy Plus. The game was marketed as "The last thing you'll ever desire" in pre-release ads that ran in computer gaming magazines.

Battlecruiser 3000AD was released against the wishes of its main designer, Derek Smart, as it was still incomplete and buggy. GameSpot gave it a score of 2.6/10, writing that "it will go down in legend as the most bug-ridden, unstable, unplayable pieces of software ever released." A column about video game patches in Next Generation remarked that the patches for Battlecruiser 3000 "broke as many elements as [they] fixed".

Battlecruiser Millennium was better received, with scores of 65% and 68% at aggregate review sites GameRankings and Metacritic respectively. According to some reviews of the game, it was as encompassing and strategically pleasing as the developer had set out to make, but lacked in user interface design friendliness and atmosphere. In 2003 Gamespy named it the 19th most overrated game of all time due to the hype Smart produced with his extremely ambitious gameplay promises that he would ultimately be unable to fulfill.

The game shipped around 80,000 units.
