= Derek Smart =

Video game developer and businessperson

Derek K. Smart is an American video game designer. He is the president and lead developer of 3000AD, Inc., an indie game development company based in Aventura, Florida. In addition he is the president of and investor in the video game development company Quest Online. Smart is an independent video game designer and software developer, and the creator of several video game series.

== Work ==
In 1996, Take 2 Interactive released his first game, Battlecruiser 3000AD. Prior to the release Smart and Take 2 were involved in a dispute over the premature release of the game. The matter was later settled out of court.

Through his 3000AD company, Smart has developed a total of nineteen games to date, across his various franchise properties; most of which are derivative works. Through his Quest Online company, he also worked on the completion of the MMO Alganon as well as that game's expansion pack, Rise of the Ourobani.

Smart also signed a deal with DC Comics in which several comics have been created for his Line of Defense games. A comic for Alganon was also released.

Smart is a lifetime International Game Developers Association (IGDA) member, and was also a board member of the Miami chapter of IGDA.

== Ludography ==
- Line of Defense (2014)
- Line of Defense Tactics (2014)
- All Aspect Warfare (2009)
- Angle of Attack (2009)
- Galactic Command Echo Squad SE (2008)
- Galactic Command Echo Squad (2007)
- Universal Combat CE 2.0 (2009)
- Universal Combat CE (2007)
- Universal Combat SE (2006)
- Universal Combat A World Apart (2005)
- Universal Combat Gold (2005)
- Universal Combat (2004)
- Battlecruiser Millennium: Gold Edition (2003)
- Battlecruiser Millennium (2001)
- Battlecruiser 3000AD (v2.0) (1998)
- Battlecruiser 3000AD (1996)

== Online activities ==
Computer Games Magazine wrote that "over time, his reputation as an online defender of his games and unabashed pistol-whipper of his enemies overshadows the games themselves". A 2012 in-depth article regarding the disconnect between his real life and his online alter-ego was written by media veteran Russ Pitts and published by Polygon.

In 2015, during the height of the Gamergate harassment campaign, Smart appeared on a Society of Professional Journalists live broadcast panel alongside Milo Yiannopoulos, then-editor of Breitbart News, Christina Hoff Sommers of American Enterprise Institute, Lynn Walsh of the Society of Professional Journalists, Asche Schow of the Washington Examiner, and others. In that panel, he decried the actions of media who were branding Gamergate members as a hate group.

Since July 2015, Smart has been embroiled in heated controversy surrounding the Star Citizen crowd-funded game which he claimed in July 2015 could never be developed due to its scope and promises. With widespread media coverage surrounding the project, he has since gone on to write various blogs about the project.
