= Void Destroyer =

2015 video game

- Void Destroyer logo
- Developer: Paul Zakrzewski
- Platform: Microsoft Windows
- Release: WW: January 20, 2015
- Genre: Real-time strategy Space combat

Void Destroyer is a real-time strategy space combat video game. It was developed by Paul Zakrzewski and was released on January 20, 2015.

== Gameplay ==
Void Destroyer is a real-time strategy space combat game.

== Development ==
Void Destroyer was developed by Paul Zakrzewski. Zakrzewski explained to The Escapist that Homeworld was a major influence for the title, describing himself as a fan. He also said that the interface and mechanics for Void Destroyer was inspired by the 1999 game.

Zakrzewski worked on the game by himself of four years before taking it to Kickstarter in 2013, asking for $20,000. Four days before the end of the Kickstarter campaign, it reached its goal. At the end of the campaign, it reached $35,606 by 1,735 backers. During the campaign, it was submitted for Steam Greenlight. It was later accepted through Greenlight on October 29, 2013. It was released to Steam Early Access in January 2014. The game was fully released on January 20, 2015.

== Reception ==
Reception

Review scores
Publication	Score
Eurogamer	6/10
IGN	7.1/10

IGN gave the game a 7.1/10.

Eurogamer gave it a 6/10.

A sequel to the game, Void Destroyer 2, was released to Steam Early Access in 2016.
