= Guild Software =

American video game developer

- Industry: Video games
- Founded: 1998
- Headquarters: Milwaukee, Wisconsin, United States
- Key people: John Bergman; Ray Ratelis; Michael Warnock
- Products: Vendetta Online
- Website: https://www.guildsoftware.com

Guild Software is a small independent computer game developer located in Milwaukee, Wisconsin (USA) founded in 1998. Guild Software is best known for creating Vendetta Online, a first-person MMORPG that uses their in-house NAOS game engine. In 2009, the studio was voted a Reader's Choice Award for Favorite Company by MMOsite.com.

In 2013, Guild Software's Vendetta Online was widely reported as the first MMORPG to support the Oculus Rift, making it potentially the first persistent online world with native support for a consumer Virtual reality headset.

Beyond game development, the company also created and maintains the free and popular Android app Barometer HD, allowing simple measurement and graphing of barometric pressure on devices equipped with pressure sensors.

== Management ==
- John Bergman — CEO, game design, artwork
- Ray Ratelis — VP of engineering
