= Jumpgate Evolution =

- Developer: NetDevil
- Publisher: Codemasters
- Platform: Microsoft Windows
- Release: Cancelled
- Genre: Space Action MMOG
- Mode: Multiplayer

Jumpgate Evolution, commonly abbreviated as JGE, is an unreleased massively multiplayer online game having been in development by NetDevil intended to be published by Codemasters. The game is a sequel to Jumpgate: The Reconstruction Initiative and features a new graphics engine, all new assets and more accessible game play.

Originally scheduled for a June 2009 release, two rounds of layoffs took place at NetDevil and the studio and game eventually shut down because of financial issues. In July 2008 the studio was then acquired by the now defunct Gazillion Entertainment.

== Gameplay ==
Evolution is an MMOG with twitch-based combat. Damage caused by the player will have constant and predictable damage, provided the target is hit. Ordnance will have a set amount of damage. Shields and armor will have a set durability. Provided the ordnance strikes the target, the outcome will not be random.

Players pick a nation at the start of the game but this does not limit them to certain roles. They can fulfill any role by buying a ship they deem fit for it. But players do have to acquire a license to be able to pilot that ship first. Players will also be able to gain standing with any nation regardless of whether they are a subject.

The game will offer both player versus environment (PvE) and player versus player (PvP) oriented content. And although open PvP is a major focus the game will also feature instanced PvP with rewards and XP. They are also working on implementing different risk/reward environments such as a system with a harsher death penalty for people who prefer a more hardcore kind of PvP gameplay.

The game will feature realm versus realm (RvR) gameplay elements such as allowing players to claim a sector of space for their nation by building up a sector control station. Squads will play an important role in this and (unlike in the previous game) Squads will be limited to players from a single nation.

The developers are aiming at creating a single type of server with all different types of gameplay spread over different areas. They want to allow players to involve themselves in different types of gameplay from day to day. However they still consider splitting up into different types of servers if this is deemed impossible.

The game will feature the same factions (now called nations) as the previous installment of the game. However the passing of time and a significant space distortion event (called The Shift) has changed the nations, one more than the other. Still only three of the nations are playable.

Playable nations are The Solrain Commonwealth, Quantar Paths and The Octavian Empire. The Solrain Commonwealth were a once benevolent but now corrupt mercantile state featuring mercenaries, smugglers, powerful corporations and major (crime) syndicates. Quantar Paths wereonce a unified nation, now dozens of cults (called Paths) unified only through the same fundamental belief that human destiny lies among the stars and that the Jumpgate network itself (called the Skein) will guide those who learn to listen. The Octavian Empire are an aggressive and militaristic nation driven to restore itself to former glory. The struggle for the currently vacant position of emperor is the cause of constant intrigue and a drain on the energy and resources of the nation but also the hope (and worry) of many for the restoration of Octavian dominance.

Other nations include The Hyperial Protectorate, The Amananth and Conflux. The Hyperial Protectorate were once a rival to the Quantar nation but were defeated by them in an earlier war. The Shift has left the Protectorate without any planet further reducing the nation's might and they now only own a single station The Amananth, the creators of a single fully automated station in pre-Shift space. The Amananth is a dead nation - in post-Shift space many abandoned stations have been found and the Amananth are now believed long dead. Many also believe post-Shift space to be the birthplace of the Amananth nation and that the Amananth were somehow responsible for the Shift itself. The Conflux are an alien race that ignores any form of communication and is aggressive to all nations. A war between the Conflux and the Humans brought the Humans almost to the brink of extinction. Although the humans fought them off the eventual outcome of the war is matter for speculation as at the height of the struggle the Shift pulled the human race away. The Conflux are also present in post-Shift space but the significance of their presence is not yet known.

== See also ==
- Jumpgate: The Reconstruction Initiative
