= Star Wraith =

- Genre(s): Space combat simulator
- Developer(s): StarWraith 3D Games
- Publisher(s): StarWraith 3D Games
- Platform(s): Microsoft Windows
- First release: Star Wraith; 2000
- Latest release: Evochron Legacy; 2016

StarWraith is a series of space combat simulators by StarWraith 3D Games.

== The Star Wraith universe and games ==
During the first two parts and also in Star Wraith: Shadows of Orion the player fights as Alliance pilot in the brutal civil war of the Alliance against the Federation. In Shadows of Orion a new threat emerges: the alien race, the Vonari. In most of the following games in the series there have been skirmishes or major conflicts with the Vonari. In StarWraith IV: Reviction the Vonari assault Earth. In RiftSpace the Vonari guard a powerful secret from humanity. In Evochron Alliance the Vonari assault the newly discovered EvoChron sector. Arvoch Conflict is the first game in which humanity counters the Vonari into their own territories.

Although Arvoch Conflict is already the fourth game featuring the Vonari there is not much known about this race. Their technology is superior to human technology. The Vonari are an intelligent, martial race of canine bipeds. What is known is that they are a powerful, galactic force that has little mercy on its prey. Underestimating humanity at first, they have now realized the strength of the Terran race and are increasing the power of their attacks.

In Evochron Renegades, taking place one year after Arvoch Conflict, we learn of an enigmatic mercenary group called the Renegades. They are determined to unravel the secret of Riftspace at all costs, leading to their disappearance. All that's left are beacons sending out encoded information or clues.

Every series of games has a different approach to space simulation. Where Evochron and RiftSpace are space trading and combat simulators, StarWraith and Arvoch games are mostly military-focused space combat simulators.

In Star Wraith and Arvoch, the player takes the role of an ensign pilot of the Alliance. In StarWraith II one can decide between Alliance and mercenary life. Star Wraith III features a dynamic campaign with two different endings. Star Wraith IV has a set campaign, but further expanded concepts. Arvoch features strategic aspects and a wide range of objectives. This is different than, for example, Wing Commander, in which the missions must be successfully completed, before the player can move on to the next.

Name-giving for the series is the "F-144 StarWraith", the most powerful starfighter of the Alliance during the StarWraith series. During the about 100 years between Reviction and Arvoch Conflict the "F-228 Evoch" was developed and is now the top-starfighter of the Alliance. Thus Arvoch Conflict does not run any longer under the title StarWraith.

Evochron and RiftSpace have a freeform approach. In both games the player takes on the role of a mercenary pilot who is starting out in the universe and searching for wealth. The difference is in the way to gain wealth. In RiftSpace, one will gather a wing to assist him, hopping from mission to mission with minor trading aspects. In Evochron Alliance, the player is a lone wolf. The game is far more free in its approach and leaves the player fully free to explore, mine, trade, pirate etc.

== The Star Wraith / Arvoch series ==
=== Star Wraith (2000) ===
This was the first game made by SW3DG with the title Star Wraith. It was written entirely in DarkBASIC. This game featured animated explosions for the first time, as well as 3D textured models, the 3D spherical radar display, and a random campaign. It also supported a variety of joysticks.

=== Star Wraith II (2002) ===
Star Wraith II improved considerably on Star Wraith. This game featured planetary assault missions for the first time. Turrets could also be added (replacing some fighters) for the first time. This game also included a simple mercenary mode and a linear campaign. Star Wraith II finally brought back the cockpit which was missing in Star Wraith and Star Wolf. In contrast, however, Bomb missions in which the player would destroy a carrier were removed.

=== Star Wraith III: Shadows of Orion (2003) ===
After the destruction of the "Richton", the flagship of the Federation, they accuse the Alliance of being responsible, and the civil war rages again. When the Alliance carrier "ABC Becker" is destroyed, the speed and the precision of the attack shows the Alliance that the Federation is not responsible for this incident: The Vonari, an aggressive hostile race, destroyed both ships and that it is only the first step in a plan that includes an attack against earth, which the Alliance manages to prevent.

=== Star Wraith IV: Reviction (2004) ===
The Vonari prepare the final attack on the Alliance. An enormous Vonari fleet meets in the Sol-system. Using an energy network, all ships of the fleet transfer their energy to the leading ship, carrying the weapon, that can destroy Earth. The Alliance has only one chance: If the energy network is saturated it will still take some time, until the weapon is ready to fire. If the leading ship is destroyed, while the energy network is saturated, a feedback impulse will destroy all ships in the network. The plan succeeds and the Vonari withdraw.

=== Arvoch Conflict (2006) ===
When more and more Alliance forces defect to the Federation, the Alliance High-Command sends the carrier ship "ABC Phantom" into the Sapphire-system to search for an explanation. The crew learns that the Federation allied itself with the Vonari, in order to destroy the Alliance. A weapon of the Vonari is found, which have obviously the power to destroy an entire planet. The Alliance decides to use the weapon against its designers and to destroy the Vonari system of Arvoch.

=== Arvoch Alliance (2011) ===
Arvoch Alliance is a first person 3D space combat simulation from StarWraith 3D Games. The player takes the role of a flight commander in the Alliance Navy, leading a team of pilots through a series of missions spanning the in-game region of space known as the Evochron quadrant. As the story unfolds, events that eventually lead to the end of the Federation/Alliance war and the liberation of Evochron take place. In the midst of an ongoing war, the return of the Vonari - an old extraterrestrial enemy in the series - signals a change in the course of the in-game human history as forces unite in a battle for survival.

== Other games in the StarWraith universe ==
=== RiftSpace (2004) ===
An ancient artifact with a prophecy is found. It is about the planet RiftSpace, which would provide its discoverer with great wealth. Many mercenaries begin the search for RiftSpace, but many further artifacts are needed to finally get the key to RiftSpace.

=== Evochron Renegades (2007) ===
Evochron Renegades features a seamless universe, improved graphics, the ability to modify ships both in performance and visually in-game and many more improvements over Evochron Alliance.

=== Evochron Legends (2009) ===
Evochron Legends delivers further improvements to graphics and gameplay over Evochron Renegades.

=== Evochron Mercenary (2010) ===
Evochron Mercenary featured a new graphics engine and added many player requested features and changes.

=== Evochron Legacy (2016) ===
Evochron Legacy, the latest Evochron title, was released simultaneously on the StarWraith website and Steam on January 18, 2016, and continuously updated.
