= Wing Commander: Armada =

1994 video game

- Developer: Origin Systems
- Publisher: Electronic Arts
- Director: Jeff Everett
- Producer: Chris Roberts
- Designers: Whitney Ayres; Jeff Everett; Jeff Grills; Denis R. Loubet
- Programmers: Chuck Carpiak; Jeff Everett; Jeff Grills
- Artist: Denis R. Loubet
- Composer: Aaron Martin
- Series: Wing Commander
- Platforms: MS-DOS, FM Towns, PC-98
- Release: MS-DOS; September 1994; FM Towns, PC-98; July 1995
- Genres: Space combat simulation, strategy
- Modes: Single-player, multiplayer

Wing Commander: Armada is a space combat simulation video game set in the universe of Chris Roberts' Wing Commander franchise. It was created by Origin Systems and published for MS-DOS by Electronic Arts in 1994. It was released for FM Towns and PC-98 in 1995. Armada was the first game of the Wing Commander series with a multiplayer mode. Released shortly before Wing Commander III: Heart of the Tiger, Armada uses a new graphics engine to render 3D ship models as compared to the sprite-based engine of Wing Commander II: Vengeance of the Kilrathi.

== Gameplay ==
Armada features single-player and multiplayer modes. In single player, the player fights the computer-controlled opponents in a number of different game types, whereas multiplayer mode allows two players to play the various game modes head-to-head or cooperatively.

=== Game modes ===
==== Battle ====
Available only in multiplayer mode, this game type consists of a head-to-head dogfight between two players. Each player chooses one of the fighters available from those of the Confed and Kilrathi inventory, then the fights begin. The player who destroys the opponent is the winner.

==== Gauntlet ====
This game type is very much like the "Gauntlet" feature from Wing Commander: Academy and is available both in single-player and multiplayer. Two players cooperatively fight computer-controlled ships. The player or players side with either the Terran Confederation or the Kilrathi Empire, then play through 15 levels, each consisting of three separate waves of enemy fighters; as the "Gauntlet" progresses, the enemy ships' strength, number and skill increase. The game ends when the player(s) beat the last wave, or a player's ship is destroyed (in multiplayer the game ends if either player is destroyed). Unlike Academy, where the player could choose which fighter to fly in the "Gauntlet", in Armada the player starts flying either the Arrow or the Dralthi light fighter, then moves to medium and heavy fighters as the game progresses.

One feature was not present in the retail version of Armada but could be enabled by installing a patch released by Origin on their website. The new feature provided each level with a code, enabling the player to restart the "Gauntlet" from the level corresponding to the code, without the requirement to play through all the previous waves.

==== Armada ====
This is the main game type featured in Armada, available both in single-player (player vs. computer) and multiplayer (player vs. player). Armada is a strategy driven game type taking place in a randomly generated sector of space which is depicted in the game's main screen: dots indicate star systems connected through one or more line representing the available space lanes for starships. The players choose a side (Confederation or Kilrathi) to play with and begin with their forces placed on the opposite sides of the sector.

Since both sides start with a carrier and a complement of two light fighters, players can build mines on the planets they visit to gather resources with which to build shipyards for more fighters or fortresses to defend specific planets. Action takes place in turns. During their turns, players can move their ships or build mines/shipyards/fortresses, while the other player waits. The game ends when one player is able to locate the opponent's carrier and attack it with heavy fighters: if the assault is successful a cinematic of the carrier blowing up is displayed and the game ends.

==== Campaign ====
The "Campaign" mode is very much like the "Armada" game type and consists of 11 scenarios played following the same rules as "Armada". To progress to the next level, one of the two sides must be defeated by destroying its carrier. At the end of the last level, depending on the points gathered during all the matches, one side is the overall winner and a cinematic of either Earth or Kilrah blowing up is shown. The "Campaign" can be played both in single-player and multiplayer.

== Reception ==
Next Generation reviewed the PC version of the game, rating it three stars out of five, and stated that "if you've been looking to play - with or against a friend - a title worth owning, wait for Wing Commander 3".

James V. Trunzo reviewed Wing Commander Armada in White Wolf Inphobia #54 (April, 1995), rating it a 4 out of 5 and stated that "Wing Commander Armada gives you the best of all worlds. Whether you simply want to do a little one-on-one dog fighting or put an end to the Kilrathi/Terran war once and for all, you can do it with this game."

== Reviews ==
- Power Play (Jul, 1994)
- MikroBitti (Dec, 1994)
