= Wing Commander (disambiguation) =

Wing commander is a senior commissioned rank in the British Royal Air Force and air forces of many countries which have historical British influence.

Wing Commander may also refer to:

- Wing Commander (franchise), the Origin Systems computer game series and related franchise
  - Wing Commander (video game), the first title in the Wing Commander computer game series
  - Wing Commander (novel series), set in the game universe
  - Wing Commander (film), a 1999 film based on the computer game
- Wing Commander, a 1984 flight simulator game published by Mastertronic, not related to the Wing Commander franchise
- Wing Commander (horse), a six-time World Grand Champion show horse
