= Wing Commander: Prophecy =

1997 video game

- Developers: Origin Systems; Raylight Studios (GBA)
- Publishers: Electronic Arts; Destination Software (GBA)
- Director: Frank Roan
- Producers: David Downing; Mark Day
- Designer: Billy Joe Cain
- Programmer: Peter Shelus
- Artist: Mark Vearrier
- Writers: David Carren; J. Larry Carroll
- Composers: George Oldziey; Bill Munyon
- Series: Wing Commander
- Engine: VISION Engine
- Platforms: Windows, Game Boy Advance
- Release: Windows: NA: December 11, 1997; EU: 1997; Game Boy Advance: NA: May 23, 2003; EU: July 17, 2003
- Genre: Space combat simulation
- Modes: Single-player multiplayer (GBA only)

Wing Commander: Prophecy is the fifth installment in the Wing Commander science fiction space combat simulator franchise of computer games. The game was released in 1997 for Windows, produced by Origin Systems and distributed by Electronic Arts. In 2003, a Game Boy Advance conversion with added multiplayer was produced by Italy-based Raylight Studios and distributed by Destination Software.

The game features a new game engine (the VISION Engine), new spacecraft, characters and story elements. The events depicted in Prophecy are set over a decade after Wing Commander IV: The Price of Freedom and, rather than the Kilrathi, the player must deal with a new alien threat, an insectoid race codenamed Nephilim that has invaded the human galaxy through a wormhole. Prophecy was the first main-line Wing Commander game in which the player did not take on the role of Christopher Blair, instead being introduced to a new player character, Lance Casey. Some of the characters and actors from previous games return in Prophecy, where they rub elbows with an entirely new cast of Confederation pilots and personnel.

A standalone expansion pack, Secret Ops, was released by Origin in 1998 solely over the Internet and for no charge. The large initial file challenged the dial-up connections of that day. Secret Ops was later released for sale in combination with Prophecy in the Wing Commander: Prophecy – Gold package.

== Gameplay ==
Controls are available in two modes: basic, catering to new and casual players, and advanced, aiming to give a more realistic feeling of space combat. The two modes leverage the same flight dynamics engine, but in basic mode turning the ship around assists the player by coupling pitch, yaw, and roll (emulating airplane flight dynamics), while in advanced mode each axis is made independent for more complex but increased control, especially when using a HOTAS setup. There is also the possibility to temporarily disable the coupling system that assists the player in keeping thrust forward as the player pivots along the axes as if the spacecraft was an airplane: when this assisting system is disabled, it is possible to tilt the spacecraft using thrusters while keeping movement constant through inertia, allowing for advanced offensive and defensive maneuvers, such as drifting sideways alongside a capital ship while shooting at it or quickly pivoting 180 degrees around and shooting at a chasing fighter.

Cockpit view

Missions are played in sequence, and while the core scenario is constant, it is possible to fail missions and keep going forward in the game. Subsequent missions may become increasingly harder as the enemy gains an upper hand on the operational theater. As is traditional for the Wing Commander franchise, the player is placed in command of a flight of fighters, piloted by various non-player characters. Some of them may be killed during missions, resulting in a Killed In Action (KIA) in the leaderboard; however, others are plot-critical and will make use of their ejection seat to escape an exploding craft.

In between missions, the player may explore the TCS Midway, the carrier vehicle upon which they are stationed, and engage various characters in conversation.

== Plot ==
Twelve years after the destruction of the Kilrathi homeworld, the Terran Confederation is building several Midway-class megacarriers, brainchild of Navy Commodore Christopher 'Maverick' Blair. The first one, the Midway herself, is undergoing her shakedown cruise, with Blair along for the ride.

The player takes the role of 2nd Lieutenant Lance Casey, son of the venerable Major Michael "Iceman" Casey from Wing Commander I. He and his best friend Max "Maestro" Garrett have been assigned to the Midway as members of the ship's junior Diamondback Squadron, led by Lieutenant Jean "Stiletto" Talvert. Blair, Colonel Jacob "Hawk" Manley and Major Todd "Maniac" Marshall compete for control of the Black Widow Squadron. In charge of the Midway's two squadrons is CAG Patricia Drake, while Captain Eugene Wilford serves as her skipper. Commander Aurora Finley heads up the "Sciences Division", while Colonel John "Gash" Dekker leads the ship's contingent of Marines. Finally, Blair's old love interest Rachel Coriolis has returned as the ship's Chief Technician.

The Midway receives a distress call from a Kilrathi cruiser in the H'rekkah system, and Marshall, Manley, Casey, Talvert and Garrett are sent to investigate. Casey is placed in command of his flight; Stiletto intends to test the rookie pilot's reputation. They find the cruiser has been destroyed, and attackers come out of the nearby asteroids. In order to alert Confed HQ of the invaders, who have been codenamed Nephilim, Casey, Blair, and Dekker fly out to an abandoned Confed relay station. The Nephilim have been lying in wait, and Blair is captured. Casey defends the station from attackers until reinforcements arrive.

The Midway is tasked with defending Kilrathi colonists in the T'lan Meth system. Casey finds himself on Hawk's wing several times, and learns more about his father. Once, when still a rookie aboard the TCS Tiger's Claw, Manley lost a wingman, and was a complete wreck for some time. Only one pilot volunteered to fly on his wing, and had to fight off nearly an entire squadron of Kilrathi until Hawk could get his act together. That pilot, Major Michael "Iceman" Casey, eventually ejected from his damaged fighter and was scooped up by the Kilrathi; the family was told instead that he was killed during a Kilrathi ambush. While Casey and Manley are assisting a wing of Kilrathi fighters, Hawk advises that they turn on them in revenge for old grievances. If Casey agrees, both he and Hawk will become hostile to the Kilrathi; if he declines, Casey and Hawk are temporarily on bad terms. The Kilrathi also withhold assistance at a later juncture if Casey attacks them. Finally, the Marines retake a captured Kilrathi starbase, on which the Nephilim held a number of human prisoners, though only one remains: Commodore Blair.

Reports filter in of a Nephilim superweapon: a plasma cannon that can destroy an entire fleet with one blast. Casey leads a raid to steal the weapon, which is subsequently grafted onto the Midway. Because of incompatibilities between Nephilim and Terran technology, the plasma gun does not work as intended, and Casey assists in its firing by delivering a primer charge to an enemy ship. This results in the complete annihilation of the hostile fleet. If Midway attempts to charge the weapon again, she runs a two-thirds risk of a fatal backfire.

The Midway moves on to the Kilrah system, where the Nephilim's wormhole gate is still pumping out ships. Casey leads an attack on the gate, which is controlled by seven shielded towers. Casey and Talvert escort Dekker's Marines in and then combat waves of Nephilim fighters, while the Marines land and deactivate the shields on the towers so that Casey can destroy them one by one. Blair, flying in on his own shuttle, lands at the last remaining tower and deactivates its shields. The Nephilim Warlord who kidnapped Blair is within the tower; Blair, distracted by this higher priority, does not escape before the explosion. Casey returns to the Midway and the Confederation as a hero. Blair is declared missing in action.

== Development ==
Wing Commander: Prophecy was the first Wing Commander game made after series creator Chris Roberts left Origin, though the game engine was taken from Roberts' last project with Origin, the unfinished game "Silverheart".

The Nephilim were designed by Syd Mead.

Character conversations were filmed in full motion video, with Mark Hamill, Tom Wilson, and Ginger Lynn Allen reprising their roles from prior games.

== Reception ==
Reception

Aggregate scores
Aggregator	Score	
Aggregator	GBA	PC
GameRankings	63%	81%
Metacritic	70/100	N/A

Review scores
Publication	Score	
Publication	GBA	PC
CNET Gamecenter	N/A	8/10
Computer Games Strategy Plus	N/A	4/5
Computer Gaming World	N/A	4.5/5 (GE) 4/5
Edge	N/A	6/10
Eurogamer	6/10	N/A
Game Informer	7/10	8.5/10
GameRevolution	N/A	B+
GameSpot	7.4/10	8.6/10
IGN	7/10	N/A
Next Generation	N/A	4/5
PC Gamer (US)	N/A	89%

The Game Boy Advance version received "mixed or average reviews" according to the review aggregation website Metacritic. Next Generation said that the PC version "offers enough solid gameplay and eye-catching graphics to satisfy even the most demanding space combat fan." GamePro criticized that due to the hyped multiplayer feature having been dropped before release, the game has little to differentiate it from previous Wing Commander games apart from its stunning graphics when using a 3D accelerator, though they said the series's familiar story and gameplay remain solid. (Note: GamePro gave the PC version a perfect 5/5 for graphics, two 4/5 scores for sound and fun factor, and 3.5/5 for control.)

PC Data, which tracked computer game sales in the U.S., reported that the PC version earned $6.7 million and sold roughly 195,000 units by October 1999. Its revenue in the country represented a drop from Wing Commander IV.

The PC version was nominated at the AIAS' inaugural Interactive Achievement Awards in the category "PC Action Game of the Year", but lost to Quake II. The PC version was also nominated for the "Best Sci-Fi Sim" award at the CNET Gamecenter Awards for 1997, which went to Star Wars: X-Wing vs. TIE Fighter. The staff of Computer Games Strategy Plus named said PC version the best "Sci-Fi Simulation" of 1997. The game also won the awards for "Best Action/Simulation" and "Best Graphics" in GameSpot's Best & Worst Awards for 1997; and for "Space Sim Game of the Year" in Computer Gaming World's 1998 Premier Awards.
