= Privateer 2: The Darkening =

1996 video game

- European cover art
- Developer: EA Manchester
- Publisher: Electronic Arts
- Director: Steve Hilliker
- Producer: Erin D. Roberts
- Artist: Adam Medhurst
- Composers: James Hannigan; Ray Shulman
- Series: Wing Commander
- Platform: MS-DOS
- Release: Original Release: EU: December 13, 1996; NA: December 28, 1996; 30th Anniversary Edition: EU: November 5, 2026; NA: November 5, 2026
- Genre: Space trading and combat simulator
- Mode: Single-player

Privateer 2: The Darkening is a space flight simulation game that was released in 1996 for MS-DOS and published by Electronic Arts under the Origin Systems brand. It is a sequel to Wing Commander: Privateer.

The game features live-action video scenes, scripted by Diane Duane and directed by Steve Hilliker, which are discovered as the plot progresses. The cast included Clive Owen, Mathilda May, John Hurt, Christopher Walken, Brian Blessed and Amanda Pays. Dani Behr voiced the onboard computer, also named Dani. The game also featured David Warner, and Jürgen Prochnow, who later played Admiral Geoffrey Tolwyn and Commander Paul Gerald, respectively, in the Wing Commander feature film. The filming took place at Pinewood Studios in England.

After the game's release, some members of the development team at EA Manchester went on to found Warthog Games, developer of the space simulator Starlancer. GOG.com released an emulated version of Privateer 2 for Microsoft Windows in 2013.

On 5th November 2026, Electronic Arts alongside GOG.com bring the fully restored Privateer 2: The Darkening to the digital storefront along with other Wing Commanders titles and Road Rash.

== Synopsis ==
The game is set in a remote region of the Wing Commander universe in the Tri-System Confederation, a three system government that has an almost three thousand-year history of its own parallel to the Terran Confederation history. In the game's opening, the cargo ship Canera is attacked during landing and crashes into Mendra City on planet Crius in the year 2790 of the Tri-System calendar (the calendar appears to be longer than a Terran year with months that are about 40 days each). One survivor, Ser Lev Arris (Clive Owen), a man in a fugue state with no memory of who he is and no record of his existence prior to two weeks before the crash, awakens from his cryo-sleep and must take on the life of a privateer in the Tri-System, rediscovering his past along the way.

== Development ==
The game had a development budget of $5 million.

The 30th Anniversary Edition was developed after the discovery of all the old FMVs which had been preserved by the Cinematics Director, Steve Hilliker, who had previously uploaded parts of the Master Footage onto his YouTube channel. Under commission by EA, Steve then digitised the tapes to create a cinematic "Director's Cut", restoring lost footage with numerous visual improvements, including colour-correction and upscaling. During this, the modder Matt Wells, who had collaborated on the remastered Wing Commander III and IV, designed and implemented the Privateer 2 Enhancement Patch on 8th December 2025, which, among crucial improvements to gameplay, allowed the enhanced FMVs to be transferred into the game. Matt continued to provide further enhancements - frame-rate smoothing, controller and joystick support, re-mappable keyboard hotkeys - alongside crucial accessibility features, such as subtitles for the cinematic segments.

== Reception ==
Reception

Review scores
Publication	Score
GameSpot	6.8/10
Next Generation	4/5
PC Games	B

A Next Generation critic said Privateer 2 "has rejuvenated the genre". While criticizing the game for its reliance on live-action video segments to advance the plot, like the mainline Wing Commander series, the reviewer said it at least gives players the option of ignoring the story. They also praised the graphics, frame rate, flight mechanics, support for most flight sticks and throttles, and upgradeable ships, though they noted several glitches and the lack of Windows 95 support. Greg Kasavin of GameSpot was more vehement about these two issues, saying they make the game feel like a rushed product. He also criticized it as being a Wing Commander game in name only, with no apparent connection to the rest of the series. However, he concluded "if you can accept its multiple shortcomings, you will find that Privateer 2 is actually a fairly solid game", citing the flight mechanics, graphics, plot, acting, and massive length. Privateer 2 was a runner-up for Computer Game Entertainment's 1996 "Best Action Game" prize, which ultimately went to Duke Nukem 3D. The editors wrote: "Not quite as freewheeling as the original, Privateer 2 is still a fluid, immersive and enjoyable game experience".

Andy Butcher reviewed Privateer 2: The Darkening for Arcane magazine, rating it a 7 out of 10 overall, and stated that "The Darkening is one of the better attempts to combine an 'interactive movie' with a real game, and offers a fair degree of enjoyment for a while. Eventually, though, the space combat and trading become repetitive, and once you've finished the plot once, there's little reason to play the game again, although there are some sub-plots that vary from game to game. Fun while it lasts, but still not a true 'Elite for the 90s'."
