= Jason Bernard =

American actor (1938–1996)

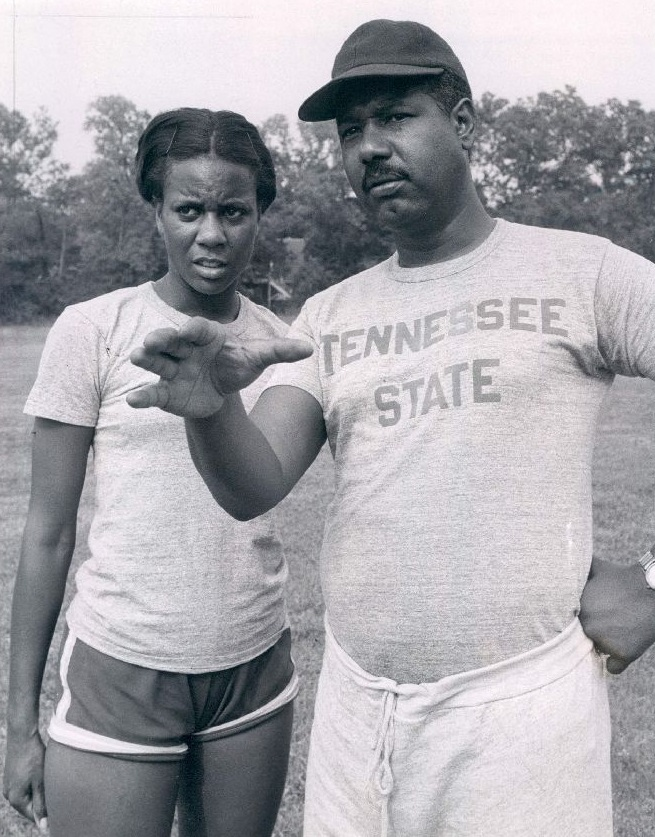
- Bernard (right) with Shirley Jo Finney in Wilma in 1977
- Born: Ronald Carl Johnson; May 17, 1938; Chicago, Illinois, U.S.
- Died: October 16, 1996 (aged 58); Burbank, California, U.S.
- Occupation: Actor
- Years active: 1969–1996
- Spouse: Debra Bernard
- Children: 1

Jason Bernard (born Ronald Carl Johnson, May 17, 1938 – October 16, 1996) was an American actor.

== Life and career ==
Bernard was born on May 17, 1938, in Chicago, Illinois. His first starring role was in the pilot episode of the television series The White Shadow as Jim Willis. His other well-known roles are in the television series Cagney & Lacey as Inspector Marquette from 1982 to 1983, Days of Our Lives as Preston Wade in 1982, and a recurring role in the first season of Night Court as Judge Stone's arrogant rival Judge Willard.

His largest role came in the 1983 NBC miniseries V as Caleb Taylor. Bernard reprised his role in the 1984 sequel V: The Final Battle. In the 1990s Fox comedy series Herman's Head, he played Herman's boss, Mr. Paul Bracken. He appeared in the video games Wing Commander III: Heart of the Tiger and Wing Commander IV: The Price of Freedom as Captain William Eisen.

Bernard's first role in a feature film was a cameo in the Charles Bronson film Death Wish, and his first major role was in the 1974 movie Thomasine & Bushrod. He later appeared in Car Wash, WarGames, No Way Out, While You Were Sleeping, and Blue Thunder.

Bernard made many guest appearances on a variety of television shows, including Starsky & Hutch; Flamingo Road; The Jeffersons; The Flash; Murder, She Wrote; Wiseguy and Partners. He also appeared, as the chief security guard, in The Dukes of Hazzard episode "The Dukes in Hollywood".

He played the blind musician Tyrone Wattell in the film All of Me. Bernard's final appearance was in the 1997 film Liar Liar as Judge Marshall Stevens.

== Death ==
Shortly after the filming of Liar Liar was completed, Bernard suffered a heart attack on October 16, 1996. He had been driving his car in Burbank, California, when he was stricken, and was involved in a rear-end collision. Bernard was rushed to Providence Saint Joseph Medical Center in Burbank where he was pronounced dead at the age of 58. He was survived by his wife Debra and son Jason Jr. His body was cremated. Both Suddenly and Liar Liar were dedicated in memory of him.

== Filmography ==
=== Film ===
Year	Title	Role	Notes
1974	Thomasine & Bushrod	Seldon	
1975	Friday Foster	Charles Foley	
1976	Car Wash	Lonnie's Parole Officer	
1978	Coma	Surgical Residents	Uncredited
1978	Uncle Joe Shannon	Goose	
1982	Fast Times at Ridgemont High	Gym Teacher	Uncredited
1983	Blue Thunder	Mayor	
1983	WarGames	Captain Knewt	
1983	The Star Chamber	Judge Bocho	
1984	All of Me	Tyrone Wattell	
1987	No Way Out	Major Donovan	
1988	Bird	Benny Tate	
1989	Paint It Black	Lt. Wilder	
1995	While You Were Sleeping	Jerry Wallace	
1997	Liar Liar	Judge Marshall Stevens	Posthumous release

=== Television ===
Year	Title	Role	Notes
1965	Days of Our Lives	Preston Wade	
1969	The Bold Ones: The New Doctors	Dr. Griffith	Episode: "To Save a Life"
1969	Then Came Bronson	Reverend Taylor	Episode: "A Long Trip to Yesterday"
1969–1972	Medical Center	Resident	2 episodes
1972	The Longest Night	FBI Agent	Television film; uncredited
1975	Movin' On	Cabe	Episode: "...To Be in Carolina"
1976	Starsky and Hutch	R.C. Turner	Episode: "Silence"
1976	The Blue Knight	Det. Bosco	2 episodes
1976	Marcus Welby, M.D.	Dr. Hal Mendoza	Episode: "Vanity Case"
1976	Switch	Capt. Dellinger	Episode: "Fleece of Snow"
1977	Delvecchio	Sgt. Ogden	Episode: "Bad Shoot"
1977	Most Wanted	Washburn	Episode: "The Dutchman"
1977	Wilma	Coach Temple	Television film
1978	The White Shadow	Jim Willis	Episode: "Pilot"
1978	A Woman Called Moses	Daddy Ben Ross	2 episodes
1980	The Righteous Apples	Dr. Wilson	Episode: "Apple Juice"
1980	The Night the City Screamed	Dale Wrightson	Television film
1981	Ramblin' Man	Turman	Episode: "On the Run"
1981–1982	Flamingo Road	Carl Turner	4 episodes
1982	Pray TV	Everett	Television film
1982	M*A*S*H	Major Quentin Rockingham	Episode: "The Tooth Shall Set You Free"
1982	Here's Boomer	Sergeant Lindsey Andrews	Episode: "Flatfoots"
1982	The Greatest American Hero	Morgan	Episode: "Divorce, Venusian Style"
1982	Tucker's Witch	Mr. Stillwell	Episode: "Terminal Case"
1982	I Was a Mail Order Bride	Judge	Television film
1982–1988	Cagney & Lacey	Deputy Inspector Marquette	10 episodes
1983	Benson	Professor Roger Petrie	Episode: "Family Tree"
1983	High Performance	Fletch	Episode: "Along Came a Spider"
1983	V	Caleb Taylor	2 episodes
1983	The Jeffersons	Lloyd Tyndall	3 episodes
1984	V: The Final Battle	Caleb Taylor	3 episodes
1984	Wolf Rock TV	Mr. Morris (voice)	
1984	Hunter	Chief Kenny Lanark	Episode: "The Hot Grounder"
1984	Airwolf	Aaron Martin	Episode: "Sins of the Past"
1984	City Killer	Captain Frank Sydney	Television film
1984	The Dukes of Hazzard	The Chief Guard	Episode: "The Dukes in Hollywood"
1984	Night Court	Judge Robert T. Willard	2 episodes
1984	Riptide	Mr. Collins	Episode: "It's a Vial Sort of Business"
1984	Knots Landing	Dr. Garner	4 episodes
1984	This Is the Life		Episode: "Dark Journey"
1985	Crazy Like a Fox		Episode: "The Geronimo Machine"
1985	The Rape of Richard Beck	Sgt. Wally Rydell	Television film
1985	Hotel	Irwin Smith	Episode: "Obsessions"
1985	The Facts of Life	Frank	Episode: "Teacher, Teacher"
1985	Hardcastle and McCormick	Arnie Sandoval	Episode: "Conventional Warfare"
1985	Shadow Chasers	Burke	Episode: "The Many Lives of Jonathan"
1986	The Children of Times Square	Lt. Devins	Television film
1986	Comedy Factory	Finney Morgan	Episode: "The Faculty"
1986	Starman	Chief Harold Galley	Episode: "Peregrine"
1986	The Cosby Show	Sgt. Major Boswell Stokes	Episode: "War Stories"
1986–1987	It's Garry Shandling's Show	Officer Sweeny	2 episodes
1987	Amen	Dexter	Episode: "Frye for the Defense"
1987	A Year in the Life	Richard	Episode: "Don't I Know You from Somewhere?"
1987	CBS Summer Playhouse	Vern Puckett	Episode: "Kingpins"
1987	Perry Mason: The Case of the Murdered Madam	Sergeant Koslow	Television film
1987	Beauty and the Beast	Jack Davis	Episode: "An Impossible Silence"
1988	Police Story: Gladiator School	Lt. Crawford	Television film
1988	Designing Women	Wilson Brickett	Episode: "The Candidate"
1988	Empty Nest	Mr. Noack	Episode: "Tinker to Evers to Tucson"
1989	Original Sin	Det. Mitchell	Television film
1989	Unsub	Bishop Grace	2 episodes
1989	Heart and Soul	Cecil Kincaid	Television film
1989	American Playhouse	Martin Luther King, Jr.	Episode: "The Meeting"
1989	Hardball		Episode: "Till Death Do Us Part"
1989	Wiseguy	Attorney General	2 episodes
1990	Equal Justice	Judge Thaddeus Jones	Episode: "Separate Live"
1990–1991	The Flash	Dr. Desmond Powell	2 episodes
1991–1994	Herman's Head	Mr. Paul Bracken	72 episodes
1992	Dinosaurs	Edward R. Hero (voice)	Episode: "And the Winner Is..."
1994	Where on Earth Is Carmen Sandiego?	Additional Voices (voice)	
1994	Cosmic Slop	Bernard Shields	Television film
1995	The Computer Wore Tennis Shoes	Prof. Miles Quigley	Television film
1995	Down, Out & Dangerous	Detective Danner	Television film
1996	Murder, She Wrote	Wilson Sloane	Episode: "Death Goes Double Platinum"
1996	Sophie & the Moonhanger	Holt	Television film
1996	Partners	Leavitt	Episode: "You Quit?"
1996	The Rockford Files: Friends and Foul Play	Leon Martin	Television film
1996	Suddenly	Louie	Television film; posthumous release

=== Video games ===
Year	Title	Role	Notes
1994	Wing Commander III: Heart of the Tiger	Capt. William Eisen	
1995	Wing Commander IV: The Price of Freedom	Capt. William Elsen	
