= Wing Commander (film) =

1999 science fiction film directed by Chris Roberts

- Theatrical release poster
- Directed by: Chris Roberts
- Screenplay by: Kevin Droney
- Story by: Kevin Droney; Chris Roberts
- Based on: Wing Commander by Chris Roberts
- Produced by: Todd Moyer
- Starring: Freddie Prinze Jr.; Saffron Burrows; Matthew Lillard; Tchéky Karyo; Jürgen Prochnow; David Suchet
- Cinematography: Thierry Arbogast
- Edited by: Peter Davies
- Music by: David Arnold (Theme); Kevin Kiner (Score)
- Production companies: Digital Anvil; Origin Systems
- Distributed by: 20th Century Fox (select territories); Summit Entertainment (Worldwide)
- Release date: March 12, 1999
- Running time: 100 minutes
- Country: United States
- Language: English
- Budget: $25-27 million
- Box office: $11.6 million

Wing Commander is a 1999 science fiction film loosely based on the video game series of the same name. It was directed by Chris Roberts, the creator of the game series, and stars Freddie Prinze Jr., Matthew Lillard, Saffron Burrows, Tchéky Karyo, Jürgen Prochnow, David Suchet, and David Warner.

Principal photography took place in Luxembourg in 1998 and post-production was done in Austin, Texas. The film was released on March 12, 1999. It received negative reviews and grossed $11.6 million. The film was the second on-screen collaboration with Lillard and Prinze after She's All That; both later worked in the first two Scooby-Doo films and Summer Catch.

== Plot ==
In 2654, an interstellar war rages between the Terran Confederation and the Kilrathi Empire. The cat-like Kilrathi seek the complete eradication of the human race.

A massive Kilrathi armada attacks Pegasus Station, a remote but vital Confederation base, and captures a navigation computer, through which it locates Earth. Admiral Geoffrey Tolwyn recalls the Terran fleet to defend Earth, but expects it to arrive two hours too late. Tolwyn orders Lieutenant Christopher Blair, whose father he knew from a previous conflict called the Pilgrim Wars, to carry orders to the carrier TCS Tiger Claw in the Vega Sector, under the command of Captain Jason Sansky, to fight a suicidal delaying action to buy the needed time.

Lieutenants Blair and Todd Marshall are pilots fresh out of training, traveling aboard the small supply ship Diligent, commanded by Captain James Taggart, to their new posting aboard the Tiger Claw. En route, the ship is pulled into a gravity well and loses its navigation computer. While Taggart repairs it, Blair space-jumps them to safety, calculating the jump in under ten seconds. Taggart notes that Blair outperformed the computer.

Along with the awkwardness of joining a new unit, and continual pranks that require discipline from his wing commander Lieutenant Commander Jeanette Deveraux, Blair fights the distrust of Commander Paul Gerald and his crewmate Lieutenant Ian St. John because of the drastic orders he brings from the Admiral, and because his mother was a "Pilgrim", a strain of humans who were the cause of the Pilgrim Wars. Pilgrims were the first human explorers and colonists and had developed the innate ability to navigate space by feel despite obstacles such as black holes. Marshall finds a kindred spirit in Lieutenant Rosie Forbes and falls in love with her, but she dies when her fighter is damaged after a battle with an advance group of Kilrathi vessels and crashes on the flight deck during landing as the result of friendly competition with Marshall. The incident enrages Deveraux and shakes Marshall's confidence.

Despite several setbacks, the Tiger Claw's personnel successfully attack and board a Kilrathi communications ship with the Diligent. In the attack, they find the stolen navigation computer and learn the coordinates the Kilrathi fleet will use to approach Earth. The Tiger Claw, however, is heavily damaged and can do nothing more to prevent the assault, except to send Deveraux and Blair in fighters to find their way back to Earth. While it would normally be impossible for fighters to make such a jump without a navigation computer, Blair's Pilgrim heritage enables him to calculate the jump himself. If alerted to the Kilrathi's plans, Earth forces can destroy each Kilrathi ship before it gets its bearings after the space-jump; if not, Earth's defenses will surely be overwhelmed. Before Blair leaves, Taggart, who is in reality a Naval Intelligence officer, reveals himself to be a Pilgrim as well, shocking Blair.

Deveraux's fighter is disabled in combat after destroying a missile, but she convinces Blair not to rescue her but to continue his mission. Blair uses his Pilgrim sense to jump to the vicinity of Earth. As his fighter begins to run out of fuel, he transmits the information Earth needs to defeat the Kilrathi assault. He is pursued through the jump by the Kilrathi command ship, but his position lets him bait the Kilrathi into the gravity well he encountered at the start of the movie. He pulls his fighter away at the last minute but the command ship is pulled in due to its larger mass. Unprepared, the Kilrathi fleet is destroyed by the Earth fleet without a fight. A Rescue and Recovery pilot from the Earth fleet rescues Blair while Taggart rescues Deveraux in the Diligent. Blair and Deveraux are reunited on the Tiger Claw and share a kiss as Deveraux is taken to get medical attention.

== Cast ==
- Freddie Prinze Jr. as First Lieutenant Christopher "Maverick" Blair
- Saffron Burrows as Lieutenant Commander Jeannette "Angel" Deveraux
- Matthew Lillard as First Lieutenant Todd "Maniac" Marshall
- Tchéky Karyo as Commodore James "Paladin" Taggart (as Tcheky Karyo)
- Jürgen Prochnow as Commander Paul Gerald
- David Suchet as Captain Jason "Jay" Sansky
- David Warner as Admiral Geoffrey Tolwyn
- Ginny Holder as Lieutenant Rosie "Sister Sassy" Forbes
- Hugh Quarshie as Lieutenant Obutu
- Ken Bones as Admiral Bill Wilson
- John McGlynn as Commodore Richard Bellegarde
- Richard Dillane as Lieutenant Ian "Hunter" St. John
- Mark Powley as Lieutenant Adam "Bishop" Polanski
- David Fahm as Lieutenant Joseph "Knight" Khumalo
- Mark Hamill as The voice of Merlin (uncredited; credited as "?")
- Simon MacCorkindale as Flight Boss
- Craig Kelly as Radar Man Falk
- Fraser James as Helmsman
- Kieron Phipps as Peterson
- Chris Roberts as Lieutenant Roberts, Rescue and Recovery Pilot (uncredited)

== Production ==
In late 1997 Digital Anvil, the entertainment company founded by Wing Commander creator Chris Roberts, acquired the live action feature film rights to the Wing Commander series from Electronic Arts.

Roberts acknowledged the questionable quality of prior video game adaptations, but felt confident the cinematic quality of the Wing Commander series as well as his experience directing the live-action scenes in Wing Commander III: Heart of the Tiger and Wing Commander IV: The Price of Freedom would serve him in adapting the property to feature film. In order to stretch the film's budget, Roberts limited the film's setting to the interiors of the spaceships with filming predominantly done on two sound stages in Luxembourg which Roberts said was done to evoke similar feelings of claustrophobia felt in Das Boot. As the film served as something of a prequel to the Wing Commander games, Mark Hamill was deemed too old to reprise his role as Blair. The producers had planned on having Malcolm McDowell reprise his role as Admiral Tolwyn, but McDowell became unavailable due to commitments to the Fantasy Island remake. In order to be released prior to Star Wars: Episode I – The Phantom Menace, the crew needed to truncate the production schedule from the planned 10 to 12 months down to six months with Digital Anvil's initial plan of producing all the effects shots themselves adjusted so certain effects could be farmed out to third party effects houses.

Freddie Prinze Jr. later said, "I can't stand Wing Commander. I can't watch one scene of that movie... I read the script and loved it. So did my buddy Matthew Lillard. We both got the parts. We went on location and they said, 'Here's the new script'. It was a piece of shit."

== Relations to other Wing Commander works ==
The film has been criticized by some fans for altering the visual style of the most recent Wing Commander games. The most notable shift between the games and the movie is the appearance of the Kilrathi. Although the movie's Kilrathi retain feline facial characteristics, they lose their signature fur entirely. Roberts has since said that this change was a result of his ongoing unhappiness with the appearance of the 'live' Kilrathi, none of which lived up to his internal vision. He had previously re-imagined the Kilrathi between Wing Commander III and IV, going so far as to completely redesign the Melek character between the two games. Roberts, even after production of the film, was left unsatisfied with the results of the film version of the Kilrathi.

Wing Commander Arena, the latest game in the series, makes reference to the movie, including references to the Pilgrim War, while using ships and settings which first appeared in the main series of games. The manual Star*Soldier does make references to some of the ships from the movie, showing them in silhouettes.

== Reception ==
On the review aggregator website Rotten Tomatoes, 10% of 51 critics' reviews are positive, with an average rating of 3.2/10. The website's consensus reads: "The low budget may explain Wing Commander's cheesy special effects, but can't excuse the lame dialogue or the movie's obsessive reliance on sci-fi cliches." Metacritic, which uses a weighted average, assigned the film a score of 21 out of 100, based on 21 critics, indicating "generally unfavorable" reviews. Audiences polled by CinemaScore gave the film an average grade of "D" on an A+ to F scale.

== See also ==
- List of films based on video games
