= Who Is Alice =

2017 Dutch-British film by Robert van den Broek

- Directed by: Robert van den Broek; Ismaël Lotz
- Story by: Paul Smit
- Produced by: Arjan Bakker; Paul Smit; Ismaël Lotz; Robert van den Broek; Guido Weijers
- Starring: Ali Bastian; Patrick Holland; Keith Ackerman; Lee Brace
- Cinematography: Ismaël Lotz
- Edited by: Ismaël Lotz
- Music by: Linze Valk
- Release date: 1 September 2017
- Running time: 104 minutes
- Countries: Netherlands; United Kingdom
- Language: English

Who Is Alice is a 2017 British comedy film directed by Robert van den Broek and Ismaël Lotz and starring Ali Bastian, Patrick Holland, Keith Ackerman, and Lee Brace.

== Plot ==
Alice is a 35 year old actress desperately hanging on to her 'new young thing' career. She is willing to sacrifice almost everything in order to reach the top and this mind-bending story takes us down the rabbit hole with her. Alice meets Dick, a car salesman who is disillusioned with life and dreaming about becoming a spiritual teacher. Together with a renegade cast of misfit characters they hilariously and awkwardly tie themselves in knots as they find their 'way'. And where does that 'way' lead them? ... To exactly where they are supposed to be. Who is Alice uses humour guided by the a little non-dual thinking to help us look at ourselves and life in a different way. If the insight strikes, your whole perspective can change, while 'in reality' nothing has to change.

== Cast ==
- Ali Bastian as Alice & Nina
- Patrick Holland as Walter & Dick
- Keith Ackerman as John/Mr. Hanson
- Lee Brace as Martin
- Maurizio Benazzo as Paolo
- David Fahm as Mark
- Robert J. Francis as Leo
- David Wade as Tom
- Naomi Willow as Bridget
- Summer Jade Webber as Anna
- Cally Lawrence as Cally & Sandra
- Lee Lomas as Badrik
- William Sutton as Maharaj
- Jeremiah Flemming as Estate Agent
- Elkie Deadman as Spiritual Teacher
