= David Fahm =

Zambian-British actor

- Born: Kitwe, Zambia
- Occupation: Actor

David Fahm is a Zambian-British film, theatre and television actor. Fahm is best known for such films and television series as Michael Winterbottom's Wonderland, Wing Commander, Code 46, Spice World, The Bill and Who Is Alice.
