= Suddenly (1996 film) =

- Genre: Drama
- Teleplay by: David Kinghorn
- Story by: David Kinghorn; Marilyn Kinghorn
- Directed by: Robert Allan Ackerman
- Starring: Kirstie Alley; Jason Beghe; Colleen Camp
- Music by: David Mansfield
- Country of origin: United States
- Original language: English

Production
- Executive producers: Michele Brustin; Richard Brams; Robert Allan Ackerman; Jeff Weiss; Kirstie Alley
- Producers: Mark Allan; Richard Brams
- Cinematography: Walt Lloyd
- Editor: Charles Bornstein
- Running time: 96 minutes
- Production companies: Michele Brustin Productions; Rysher Entertainment; Scripps Howard Entertainment; True Blue Productions; Weisworld Premieres

Original release
- Network: ABC
- Release: December 1, 1996

Suddenly is a 1996 American drama television film starring Kirstie Alley and Jason Beghe. Directed by Robert Allan Ackerman and written by David Kinghorn and Marilyn Kinghorn, it was first aired on ABC on December 1, 1996. It deals with some of the issues faced by paraplegic wheelchair users. Jason Bernard appears posthumously in the film.

== Plot ==
Marty Doyle is a hard-working waitress in San Pedro, Los Angeles. Despite her wisecracking and positive demeanor, she feels her life is pretty empty, with only one plus point; a new relationship.

One day, her life is turned upside down when she is knocked down by a car. In that instant, Marty loses the use of her legs and her sense of self-worth, and, soon after, she loses her boyfriend. Though she attempts to get on with life, her efforts are dealt a massive blow when she is mugged. Feeling utterly despondent and depressed, Marty starts to feel sorry for herself and turns to alcohol. Just when she’s at her lowest, she meets and befriends Joe Mulvey, a fellow paraplegic, who helps her cope with her new way of life.

== Cast ==
- Kirstie Alley as Marty Doyle
- Jason Beghe as Joe Mulvey
- Colleen Camp as Jude
- Nancy Cartwright as Dell
- David Crosby as Eddie
- David Beecroft as Doug
- Michael Paul Chan as Mr. Chow
- Persia White as Trina
- Anthony Russell as Willie
- Jason Bernard as Louie
- Shaun Toub as Mr. Tabibisdan
- W. W. Wilson as Cabbie Paulie
- Alice Lo as Mrs. Chow
- Charles Noland as Cabbie Mike
- Manny Perry as Bus Driver
- Don Keith Opper as Barney

== Production ==
The film was previously titled An Urban Legend and When Somebody Loves You. Filming took place in San Pedro, Los Angeles.
