= Thomas F. Wilson =

American actor (born 1959)

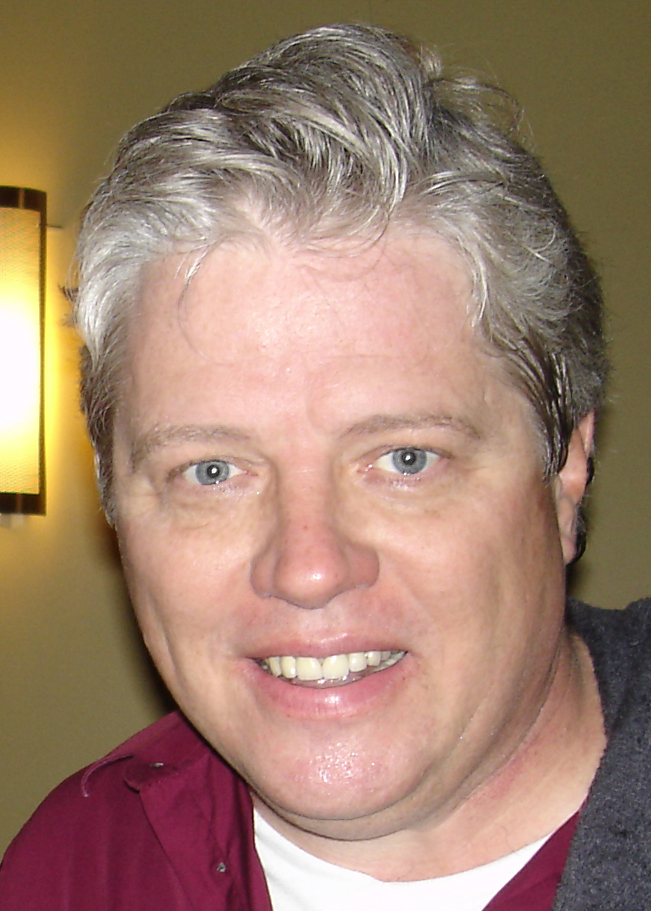
- Wilson in July 2011
- Born: Thomas Francis Wilson Jr. April 15, 1959 (age 67); Philadelphia, Pennsylvania, U.S.
- Other name: Tom Wilson
- Occupations: Actor; stand-up comedian; musician; podcaster; YouTuber
- Years active: 1979–present
- Spouse: Caroline Thomas (m. 1985)
- Children: 4

YouTube information
- Channel: TomWilson
- Years active: 2006–present
- Genre: Vlog
- Subscribers: 53.5 thousand
- Views: 8 million
- Website: tomwilsonusa.com

Thomas Francis Wilson Jr. (born April 15, 1959) is an American actor, stand-up comedian, musician, podcaster, and YouTuber. He is best known for playing Biff Tannen, Griff Tannen, and Buford "Mad Dog" Tannen in the Back to the Future film trilogy (1985–1990). He played coach Ben Fredricks in the comedy series Freaks and Geeks (1999–2000) and voices various characters, mainly villains, like Flats the Flounder and The Tattletale Strangler on the animated series SpongeBob SquarePants (2001–present). He also voices Cecil Star, the father of Patrick Star, in the SpongeBob spinoff The Patrick Star Show.

== Early life ==
Thomas Francis Wilson Jr. was born in Philadelphia on April 15, 1959, and grew up in nearby Wayne. While attending Radnor High School, he was involved in dramatic arts, served as president of the debate team (where his partner was future New York Times columnist David Brooks), played the tuba in the high school band, and was the drum major of the school marching band. He studied international politics at Arizona State University and attended the American Academy of Dramatic Arts in New York City. In 1979, he got his first significant stage experience as a comedian.

== Career ==
In 1981, Wilson moved to Los Angeles to pursue his acting career. He shared an apartment with fellow aspiring comedians Andrew Dice Clay and Yakov Smirnoff, and later joked that he "taught them both about America". He had a small role in the second season of NBC's Knight Rider in an episode titled "A Knight In Shining Armor".

Wilson's breakthrough role was as the bully Biff Tannen in the 1985 film Back to the Future. He returned in the sequels Back to the Future Part II and Back to the Future Part III, reprising his role as Biff, and as Biff's grandson Griff Tannen and great-grandfather Buford "Mad Dog" Tannen. In each Back to the Future film, his character ends up in a pile of manure after trying to kill or hurt Michael J. Fox's character Marty McFly. He reprised his role as Biff and voiced various Tannen relatives in the animated series.

Wilson did not reprise his role as Biff in the initial versions of Telltale's Back to the Future: The Game released in 2011, being replaced by Kid Beyond. When the game was ported to the PlayStation 4, Xbox 360, and Xbox One in 2015 in commemoration of the original film's 30th anniversary, Wilson returned to provide Biff's voice in these newer versions. Wilson found the car scene in the first Back to the Future, in which he molests Lea Thompson's character, Lorraine the most difficult scene he shot. In between takes Wilson whispered to Thompson "I'm so sorry, Lea." to which Thompson replied with "It's just acting, Tom."

In 1992, he voiced gangster Tony Zucco in Batman: The Animated Series and police detective Matt Bluestone in the animated series Gargoyles. In 1994, Wilson was briefly reunited with his Back to the Future co-star Christopher Lloyd in the film Camp Nowhere. He later went to co-star with Mark Hamill in the video game Wing Commander III: Heart of the Tiger. It was the third chapter in the Wing Commander series, but the first to feature live action. The character played by Wilson was Major Todd "Maniac" Marshall, a fellow starfighter pilot to Hamill's character. Wilson starred in the sequels Wing Commander IV: The Price of Freedom (1995) and Wing Commander: Prophecy (1997) and contributed his voice to the animated series Wing Commander Academy (1996) in the same role. He guest starred in an episode of Lois & Clark: The New Adventures of Superman in 1997.

Wilson played McKinley High School's Coach Ben Fredricks in the 1999–2000 NBC comedy drama Freaks and Geeks.

Wilson has done voice-over work for the Nickelodeon television series SpongeBob SquarePants. He has voiced many villainous characters that are physically strong and menacing, such as Flats the Flounder in the third-season episode "The Bully", The Tattletale Strangler in "SpongeBob Meets the Strangler", and the non-villainous character Reg the Club Bouncer in "No Weenies Allowed". In 2005, he played Coach Phelps in the TV series Zoey 101.

In 2009, he released his first stand-up comedy special and second comedy album, Tom Wilson: Bigger Than You.

According to a 2012 Gawker article, the rise in popularity of the Back to the Future series led many people to repeatedly ask Wilson questions about the films and his co-stars. Because he found the repetitive nature of the questions to be both amusing and frustrating, he wrote a song about them titled "Biff's Question Song" which he includes in his stand-up routine. He hosted a podcast, Big Pop Fun, on the Nerdist Network from 2011 to 2014. The podcast featured Wilson sharing stories of his career, as well as informal chats with show business friends including Samm Levine, Blake Clark, Steve Oedekerk and "Weird Al" Yankovic.

Wilson maintains a YouTube channel, where he regularly vlogs. As of April 2025, his channel has over 44,400 subscribers.

== Personal life ==
Wilson married Caroline Thomas on July 6, 1985, exactly three days after Back to the Future was released. They have four children, and live in Los Angeles, California.

Wilson is a devout Catholic and released a contemporary Christian album in 2000 called In the Name of the Father. He is a painter in his spare time, and many of his paintings focus on classic children's toys. In 2006, he was selected to join the California Featured Artist Series at Disneyland.

== Filmography ==
=== Comedy specials ===
Year	Title	Role	Notes
2009	Tom Wilson: Bigger Than You	Himself	Stand-up special Also executive producer

=== Film ===
Year	Title	Role	Notes
1985	Ninja Turf	Member of Spike's Gang	
1985	Back to the Future	Biff Tannen	
1986	April Fool's Day	Arch Cummings	
1986	Let's Get Harry	Bob Pachowski	
1987	Smart Alex	Lieutenant Stevenson	
1988	Action Jackson	Officer Kornblau	
1989	Back to the Future Part II	Biff Tannen, Griff Tannen, Gertrude Tannen	
1990	Back to the Future Part III	Buford "Mad-Dog" Tannen, Biff Tannen	Saturn Award for Best Supporting Actor
1992	High Strung	Al Dalby	
1993	Blood In Blood Out	Det. Rollie McCann	
1994	Caroline at Midnight	Officer Keaton	
1994	Mr. Write	Billy	
1994	Camp Nowhere	Lt. Eliot Hendricks	
1995	Born to Be Wild	Det. Lou Greenburg	
1997	That Darn Cat	Officer Melvin	
1998	Girl	The Ticket Seller	
2003	Atlantis: Milo's Return	Ashtin Carnaby	Voice, direct-to-video
2004	The SpongeBob SquarePants Movie	Victor	Voice
2006	Larry the Cable Guy: Health Inspector	Bart Tatlock	
2006	Zoom	Dylan's Teacher	
2009	The Informant!	Mark Cheviron	
2009	House Broken	Fire Chief Henry Decker	
2010	Yohan: The Child Wanderer	Kevin	
2011	Rio	Trapped Bird, Screaming Hang Glider	Voice
2012	Atlas Shrugged: Part II	Robert Collins	
2013	Epic	Finn	Voice
2013	The Heat	Captain Frank Woods	
2013	Tom and Jerry's Giant Adventure	Mr. Bigley, Ginormous	Voice, direct-to-video
2015	The SpongeBob Movie: Sponge Out of Water	Angry Customer #1	Voice
2021	Trollhunters: Rise of the Titans	Coach Lawrence	Voice
2025	The SpongeBob Movie: Search for SquarePants	Coach Tuna	Voice

=== Television ===
Year	Title	Role	Notes
1984	Knight Rider	Chip	Episode: "A Knight in Shining Armor"
1984	The Facts of Life	Moose	Episode: "All or Nothing"
1990	Turner & Hooch	Det. Scott Turner	Pilot
1991–1992	Back to the Future	Biff Tannen, additional voices	Voice, 26 episodes
1992	Batman: The Animated Series	Tony Zucco	Voice, episode: "Robin's Reckoning"
1995–1996	Gargoyles	Matt Bluestone, additional voices	Voice, 14 episodes
1996	Superman: The Animated Series	Joey	Voice, episode: "A Little Piece of Home"
1996	Wing Commander Academy	Todd 'Maniac' Marshall	Voice, 13 episodes
1996	Sabrina, the Teenage Witch	Simon	Episode: "Dream Date"
1996	Andersonville	Thomas Sweet	Television film
1997	Lois & Clark: The New Adventures of Superman	Carter Landry	Episode: "Lethal Weapon"
1997	Duckman	Park Ranger Smith	Voice, episode: "Short, Plush and Deadly"
1997	Aaahh!!! Real Monsters	Marty	Voice, 2 episodes
1997	steve.oedekerk.com	Costumer, Talk Show Host	Television special
1997–1998	Fired Up	Steve Summer	5 episodes
1998	Pinky and the Brain	Larry Bruhn	Voice, episode: "Dangerous Brains"
1998	Men in White	Ed Klingbottom	Television film
1998	The New Batman Adventures	Howlin' Jake	Voice, episode: "Torch Song"
1998	Oh Yeah! Cartoons	Mark the Polar Bear	Voice, episode: "Zoomates"
1998	Maggie	Hank	2 episodes
1998	The Angry Beavers	Otis Otto, Bowling Patron	Voice, episode: "Alley Oops!"
1999	The Hughleys	Stan	Episode: "Why Can't We Be Friends?"
1999	Pepper Ann	Coach Bronson	Voice, episode: "Beyond Good and Evel/One of the Guys"
1999–2000	Freaks and Geeks	Coach Ben Fredricks	6 episodes
2000–2001	Max Steel	Pete Costas	Voice, 20 episodes
2000	Buzz Lightyear of Star Command	Buster	Voice, episode: "Root of Evil"
2001	Nash Bridges	Jack Noon	Episode: "Bear Trap"
2001	The Zeta Project	Burly Boyfriend	Voice, episode: "West Bound"
2001	Titus	Joe	Episode: "Amy's Birthday"
2001–present	SpongeBob SquarePants	Flats the Flounder, Tattletale Strangler, additional voices	Voice, recurring role
2002	She Spies	Roger 'Rush' Gibson	Episode: "Fondles"
2002–2003	Do Over	Coach Dorsey	4 episodes
2003	Ed	Sean Nowell	4 episodes
2003	The Pitts	Guard	Voice, episode: "Ticket to Riot"
2003	Boston Public	Paul Stanton	Episode: "Chapter Sixty-Six"
2003	Stripperella	Tom Green, Zumo, Painted Patron, Director	Voice, 2 episodes
2003	Two and a Half Men	Mike	Episode: "Pilot"
2004	The Mullets	Lyle Turner	Episode: "Losin' It"
2004	Rock Me Baby	Buffalo Buck	Episode: "Go, Otis! It's Your Birthday!"
2004	Johnny Bravo	Trent	Voice, episode: "The Time of My Life"
2005	Rodney	Bill	Episode: "Sorry Charlie"
2005	Zoey 101	Coach Phelps	Episode: "Disc Golf"
2005	Higglytown Heroes	Truck Driver	Voice, episode: "Kip's Dad Gets a Strike"
2005	A.T.O.M.	Bogey	Voice, episode: "The Final Frontier"
2005	Reba	Ted	Episode: "Reba and the One"
2005	George Lopez	Sonny	Episode: "George Drives the Batmobile"
2006	Help Me Help You	Kenny	4 episodes
2006	Still Standing	Coach Kirk Stone	Episode: "Still Flunking"
2006	Cold Case	Arnold Brown	Episode: "Superstar"
2006–2008	Ghost Whisperer	Tim Flaherty	6 episodes
2007	American Body Shop	Juicy Lou	2 episodes
2007	House	Lou	Episode: "Whatever It Takes"
2007	Boston Legal	Jeffrey Bass	Episode: "Attack of the Xenophobes"
2008	The Spectacular Spider-Man	Stan Carter	Voice, 6 episodes
2008	Bones	Chip Barnett	Episode: "The Baby in the Bough"
2008	Back at the Barnyard	Krebs	Voice, episode: "Brave Udders"
2008–2009	Batman: The Brave and the Bold	Sportsmaster, Catman, Santa Claus	Voice, 12 episodes
2009	Psych	Butch	Episode: "Let's Get Hairy"
2009	Family Guy	First Step	Voice, episode: "Quagmire's Baby"
2010	Adventure Time	Head Marauder, Cat Man, Coal Guy	Voice, 2 episodes
2010	True Jackson, VP	Ben Franklin	Episode: "Field Trip"
2010–2011	Big Love	Ricky Jax	3 episodes
2011	Harry's Law	Allan Meade	Episode: "Bangers in the House"
2011	Billion Dollar Freshmen	Principal Preston	Pilot
2011	Planet Sheen	Narrator, Blurg #1	Voice, 2 episodes
2011	Melissa & Joey	Councilman Herbert Hancock	Episode: "Play Ball"
2011–2012	Franklin & Bash	Spiritual Advisor	2 episodes
2012–2016	Dragons: Riders of Berk	Bucket	Voice, 19 episodes
2013	Zach Stone Is Gonna Be Famous	Andrew "Drew" Stone	12 episodes
2014	See Dad Run	Principal Templeman	2 episodes
2015–2018	Pig Goat Banana Cricket	Banana, additional voices	Voice, main cast
2016	The Ranch	Coach Fitzgerald	Episode: "The Boys of Fall"
2016	K.C. Undercover	Agent Whitman	Episode: "The Legend of Bad, Bad Cleo Brown"
2016	School of Rock	Mr. Finn's Dad	Episode: "A Band with No Name"
2016–2018	Trollhunters: Tales of Arcadia	Coach Lawrence	Voice, 21 episodes
2017	Workaholics	Barnes	Episode: "The Most Dangerless Game"
2017	Training Day	Gary Milestone	Episode: "Quid Pro Quo"
2017	Doubt	Anthony Kellem	Episode: "Running Out of Time"
2017	Will vs. The Future	Principal Rhodes	Pilot
2017	The Mayor	Governor Fillucci	Episode: "Here Comes the Governor"
2017–2018	Mosaic	Cliff Jones	3 episodes
2018–2019	3Below: Tales of Arcadia	Coach Lawrence	Voice, 9 episodes
2018–2019	Legends of Tomorrow	Hank Heywood	9 episodes
2019	SpongeBob's Big Birthday Blowout	Dog walker/Himself	Television special
2019	The Epic Tales of Captain Underpants	Major Messy/Camoflush	Voice, episode: "Captain Underpants and the Cunning Combat of the Covert Camoflush"
2020–2021	Sydney to the Max	Grandpa Doug	3 episodes
2020	Wizards: Tales of Arcadia	Coach Laurence	Voice, episode: "Wizard Underground"
2020	NCIS	Angus DeMint	Episode: "Blood and Treasure"
2021–present	The Patrick Star Show	Cecil Star	Voice, main cast
2022–present	Spidey and His Amazing Friends	Sandman	Voice, recurring role
2022	Kamp Koral: SpongeBob's Under Years	Cecil Star	Voice, episode: "Help Not Wanted"

=== Video games ===
Year	Title	Role	Notes
1994	Wing Commander III: Heart of the Tiger	Maj. Todd "Maniac" Marshall	Credited as Tom Wilson
1996	Wing Commander IV: The Price of Freedom	Maj. Todd "Maniac" Marshall	Credited as Tom Wilson
1997	Wing Commander: Prophecy	Maj. Todd "Maniac" Marshall	Credited as Tom Wilson
2000	Star Trek: Voyager – Elite Force	Crewman Kendrick "Rick" Biessman	
2001	Crash Bandicoot: The Wrath of Cortex	Rok-Ko	Credited as Tom Wilson
2002	Run Like Hell: Hunt or Be Hunted	Craig	
2010	Spider-Man: Shattered Dimensions	Electro	
2011	Star Wars: The Old Republic	Additional voices	

=== Theme parks ===
Year	Title	Role	Notes
1991	Back to the Future: The Ride	Biff Tannen	

== Discography ==
- Tom Wilson is Funny! (2005)
- Tom Wilson: Bigger Than You (2009)

== Crew work ==
Year	Title	Position	Notes
1989	The Last Ride	Writer	Short film
1996	Get Serious: Seven Deadly Subs	Writer, producer	6 episodes

== Books ==
- Wilson, Tom (2012). The Masked Man: A Memoir and Fantasy of Hollywood. BookBaby. ISBN 978-1624880810. Self published.
