= Wing Commander II: Vengeance of the Kilrathi =

1991 video game

- Developer: Origin Systems
- Publishers: NA: Origin Systems; UK/AU: Mindscape
- Director: Stephen Beeman
- Producer: Chris Roberts
- Writers: Stephen Beeman; Ellen Beeman
- Composers: Martin Galway; Dana Karl Glover; The Fat Man
- Series: Wing Commander
- Platforms: MS-DOS, FM Towns
- Release: NA: September 7, 1991; UK: September 26, 1991; AU: September 1991
- Genre: Space combat simulation
- Mode: Single-player

Wing Commander II: Vengeance of the Kilrathi, released in 1991 for MS-DOS by Origin Systems, is the second game in Chris Roberts' Wing Commander space combat simulation video games.

Wing Commander II retains much of the first game's core conventions: an interstellar war between the Terran Confederation and the felinoid warrior race called the Kilrathi, multiple allies as wingmen, and a wide variety of ships on both sides of the war. However, WCII places a greater emphasis on storytelling, with sprite-animated cutscenes and some of the industry's first examples of voice acting. The storyline is also somewhat less open-ended: the game's campaign tree is much more structured and the player character can no longer be promoted or awarded medals. Wingmen can no longer be killed during normal gameplay; when their fighters are damaged beyond repair, they eject (though some die in scripted sequences). Finally, because the story is a direct sequel to WC, many Kilrathi ships have names similar to the WC ships they replace (for instance, the "Sartha" replaces the "Salthi", and the Confederation uses an upgraded version of the Rapier medium fighter).

Expansion packs Special Operations 1 and 2, were released in 1991 and 1992, respectively, and a stand-alone spin-off, Wing Commander Academy, in 1993. Origin also released a Speech Accessory Pack, which upgraded WCII with pre-recorded voice acting in select, plot important scenes.

A port for the Super NES by FCI was announced for May 1995, but never released. A Genesis version was also planned but never released.

== Gameplay ==
Gameplay of Wing Commander II is similar to the first Wing Commander game: a space flight simulation game, with the player piloting a ship, completing missions, and engaging enemy ships of various capabilities. There will generally be an AI-controlled wingman which the player can give orders to. The graphics, audio, and AI were improved for Wing Commander II, along with new ships and weapons, and animated cut-scenes featured voice acting. Like the first Wing Commander, missions will generally include multiple objectives. But the mission tree is much more structured and less open-ended: the game can proceed even if the objectives in the "winning" path are failed as long as the protagonist survives, but the player must successfully complete the missions in the "losing" path for the game to continue. Also, the player character can no longer be promoted or awarded medals. Wingmen can also no longer be killed during normal gameplay, and they eject when their fighters are damaged beyond repair (although some do die in some of the scripted cut-scenes).

== Plot ==
The year is 2655. The TCS Tiger's Claw, pride of the Terran Confederation's fleet, is on campaign in the Enigma sector, near the Kilrathi sector headquarters, the K'tithrak Mang starbase. In a sudden attack, it is lost with all hands, save a few pilots who had been transferred off, and one who was out on patrol: the player's character, whose name and call sign are specified by the player. Origin personnel, in these days, called him "Bluehair" after his most defining feature; in Wing Commander III: Heart of the Tiger, his name was changed to Christopher "Maverick" Blair. Blair's claims that some sort of "Kilrathi stealth fighter" destroyed the Claw are summarily dismissed, especially since his flight data recorder is damaged. He is court martialed for treason (reduced to negligence, without the flight recorder as evidence), demoted to Captain, and branded as "The Coward of K'Tithrak Mang". Admiral Geoffrey Tolwyn attempts to force Blair to resign; when Blair refuses, he is transferred to InSystem Security and exiled to Caernarvon Station in the backwater Gwynedd system.

Ten years later, Blair, flying a patrol, is startled to engage Kilrathi fightercraft in the area. Not long after, Admiral Tolwyn's flagship, the TCS Concordia, shows up on sensors, under heavy attack by a Kilrathi cruiser and her fighters. Blair and his wingman Captain Elizabeth "Shadow" Norwood together save the ship, and he is briefly reunited with some of his friends from the Claw—Colonel Jeannette Devereaux, Lieutenant Colonel Mariko Tanaka, the Kilrathi defector Colonel Ralgha nar Hhallas, Captain Etienne Montclair, and Major Zach Colson— used to assist in the attack on the Kilrathi cruiser, before being packaged back to Caernarvon. Colonel Devereaux requested a transfer for Blair to the Concordia but on the flight back, Blair states to Shadow that he probably won't get reassigned due to his past with Admiral Tolwyn. But Blair and Shadow have barely returned when the Concordia is attacked again, and an explosion on the flight deck has crippled her ability to launch fighters. In the ensuing battle, Shadow is killed, Blair triumphs, and Tolwyn, ever-mindful of the need for good pilots, takes The Coward of K'Tithrak Mang onto his flagship.

Blair's time there is not particularly easy. At least one pilot, Captain Dirk "Stingray" Wright, believes the slander spread about the Claw's destruction, and he and Blair's stauncher supporters (Tanaka, nar Hhallas, Devereaux) are frequently at odds. The flight deck explosion, a bizarre murder, and radio transmission records suggests that there is a traitor aboard the Concordia. Tolwyn frequently credits Blair's successes to his wingmen (particularly nar Hhallas). Though Maverick encounters Kilrathi Strakha stealth fighters several times, his black box always manages to malfunction or be destroyed. His repeated claims regarding the invisible ships frustrate Devereaux, who despite her belief that he didn't have anything to do with the destruction of the Tiger's Claw does not believe his statements about the cloaked ships.

Not long into the campaign, Blair's oldest friend Mariko "Spirit" Tanaka approaches him with terrible news: the Kilrathi have her fiance Phillip. He was captured some ten years earlier when the Tiger's Claw defended the Firekka system from Kilrathi attack, and the Kilrathi are demanding her betrayal in exchange for his release. Even worse, Phillip is being held on the captured Heaven's Gate starbase, which Concordia has orders to destroy. In the end, Blair and Tanaka are assigned to the strike, but sabotage cripples Spirit's plane. With no recourse, she rams the station, destroying it, her fiance and herself in one herculean explosion. The news is not all bad, though: shared grief over their friend draws Blair and Jeannette "Angel" Devereaux into a budding romance.

Despite tragedy and setback, the tide begins to turn. Maverick and Angel fly a critical mission in which they trace a Kilrathi destroyer back to the K'Tithrak Mang, placing its location for the first time in the history of the Enigma Campaign. Blair is finally able to clear his name when he and Zach "Jazz" Colson engage Strakha stealth fighters and return, flight recorders intact, to tell the tale. Following an altercation with Angel when he reveals classified information he should not know, Jazz reveals that he, in fact, is the traitor who has been responsible for the message leaks, sabotages and murders, Blair is able to apprehend him. Finally taking matters into his own hands, Blair flies a single-handed strike against K'tithrak Mang, destroying it and defeating Imperial Crown Prince Thrakhath nar Kiranka in combat. If the campaign has not gone so well, Concordia jumps back to Gwynedd and Blair destroys a Kilrathi invasion fleet preventing a disastrous strike against Terra.

=== Special Operations 1 ===
Establishing immediately that the canonical ending involves Blair destroying K'tithrak Mang, the newly promoted Colonel Blair, along with Colonel Ralgha "Hobbes" nar Hhallas, is scheduled for a transfer to the "Special Operations" division of Intelligence, under Col. Taggart, who is Chief Field Officer of Intelligence and Special Operations in the Enigma Sector. Their transfers are delayed, however, by increasing Kilrathi presence in the Pembroke System, including the brand-new Gothri-class heavy fighter; even worse, the Rigel Supply Depot is attacked by Confederation ships, which open fire on Blair when he arrives to investigate.

The hostile fighters are from the TCS Gettysburg, a Waterloo-class cruiser. She was stationed in the N'Tanya system, where a Kilrathi colony has been undergoing a rebellion against the Empire. Loyalist Kilrathi citizens were allowed to leave N'Tanya peacefully, but the Gettysburg's skipper, Commodore Cain, ordered his pilots to open fire on their transports. The entire flight group, led by Wing Commander Colonel Ransom, Lieutenant Colonel Poelma, and Lieutenant Jason Bondarevsky, mutinied against the order to kill innocent civilians, and Cain was dispatched back to Confed HQ. The mutineers soon parted ways: Ransom wanted to live as a pirate, while Poelma and Bondarevsky were all for returning to Confed. It was Ransom's group that captured the Rigel depot; Poelma and Bondarevsky, in the meantime, have been promised pardons by Confed C-in-C. Blair is assigned to bring them back to the Concordia and destroy the Rigel depot. In doing so, he gets a chance to try out the Fleet's newest torpedo bomber, the YA-18A Crossbow, which the Gettysburg was field-testing. The returning Gettysburg crew was acquitted, and Bondarevsky in fact promoted and decorated for his integrity.

Taggart arrives aboard the Bonnie Heather and retrieves Blair and nar Hhallas, as well as Major Edmond, the Concordia's communications officer, for their Special Operations duties, which will take place on Olympus Station in the Ghorah Khar system. Like N'Tanya, Ghorah Khar is in rebellion, and Taggart's Special Operations involve helping these rebels succeed, in the form of contributions of leadership, pilots and matériel. Blair also helps intercept a Loyalist dead drop, replacing the invasion plans contained within with Confed-developed plans that will lead the Kilrathi fleet into an ambush. The Kilrathi arrive in far more force than anticipated, and Maverick and Hobbes fly several strikes against these attack groups.

At this point comes an unexpected complication: Taggart is ambushed at a jump point and the Heather crippled. All seems lost when another flight of Kilrathi ships jumps in, but they start shooting the first flight. Blair and Hobbes arrive, drive them off, and rescue an ejected Kilrathi pilot to see if they can get some answers. This ejected pilot turns out to be none other than Crown Prince Thrakhath nar Kiranka: the second flight, he explains, was an assassination attempt led by Khasra, a cousin of Thrakhath, in a bid for the throne of Kilrah. Though Thrakhath is imprisoned in the brig, a power failure allows him to escape; he grabs Hobbes's Crossbow and sorties out to avenge himself upon Khasra. Blair, attempting to retrieve him, is forced to help out, and the war's two best pilots together make short work of the Kilrathi rebels, while Thrakhath escapes.

The remaining Kilrathi fleet attempts to destroy Olympus Station once and for all; Olympus's flight group is already seriously thinned, and their communications have been jammed. Blair, leading the defense, knows his chances are grim, until a group of pilots from the Gettysburg (with Bondarevsky announcing their presence to Blair), sent along by a concerned Admiral Tolwyn, saves the day. With Ghorah Khar securely in Confederation hands, the N'Tanya, K'arakh and Shariha colonies manage to successfully rebel against the Empire. Thrakhath, with tons of military intelligence in his head, takes advantage of the fact that the Enigma Sector fleets are distracted with Ghorah Khar and captures Deneb Sector Command in less than six hours.

=== Special Operations 2 ===
Blair's leave on Akko Base in the Canewdon System is cut short, but he doesn't mind one bit: Zachary "Jazz" Colson, the traitor from Wing Commander 2, has been sentenced to death, and Maverick will be escorting his prison ship. However, a distraction allows the Mandarins, a society of human traitors that Jazz belongs to, to hijack the Bastille and free Jazz. When he returns to the Concordia, Blair discovers that a new squadron has arrived: the Wild Eagles, under command of Todd "Maniac" Marshall, flying the experimental Morningstar heavy fighters. Almost immediately the Morningstars show their problems: their jump drives don't work very well, forcing Blair to jump out and rescue an ejected pilot, Captain Maria "Minx" Grimaldi. She's very thankful for the rescue. Finally, while on patrol, Blair encounters a crippled Kilrathi Dorkathi transport, which surrenders. A Mandarin agent on board reveals that this freighter, the Gamal Gan, was headed to Ayer's Rock, the Mandarins' home base. This is the first indication that the Kilrathi are actively aiding the Mandarins, though the player has known for a while: one of the game's opening scenes shows the Emperor ordering a Mandarin to capture a Morningstar using them.

The Mandarins begin transmitting propaganda movies, specifically the hijacking of several Terran freighters. The raids are quite clearly led by Zach Colson. The crews of the freighters are eventually traded for several Mandarin prisoners. Even worse, Thrakhath's ambitions are realized when a Mandarin traitor sets off a bomb on the Concordia's flight deck and steals a Morningstar. The traitor, Maria Grimaldi, heads for Ayer's Rock; clever deployment of Kilrathi patrols prevent Maverick and Maniac from following her.

Deciding that it's time for some cover agents of their own, Paladin takes over the Gamal Gan. He renames it the Grimalkin and transfers Maverick and Maniac back to Special Ops. Hiding two Morningstars aboard the Grimalkin, the three infiltrate the Ayer system. The Morningstar's torpedoes are supplemented by a new weapon: the "Mace" tactical nuclear missile. Though unguided, it can be detonated manually by the launching pilot, and does splash damage to whatever's in range. Minx makes it to an escape pod, but escape pods are not enough to prevent radiation poisoning. Jazz stole her Morningstar, giving Maverick the opportunity to shoot him down before returning to the Concordia. In a humorous scene, Maniac's Morningstar, which broke down just after launch for the mission against Jazz, is seen drifting and deserted in space, evidently neither Blair nor Paladin cared to rescue him (Maniac returns, hale and hearty, in the next game in the series, Wing Commander III: Heart of the Tiger). Thrakhath once again turns defeat into victory, by savaging the 6th Battle Fleet; the Confederation is forced to retreat, once again, from the Enigma sector.

== Reception ==
Reception

Review scores
Publication	Score
Computer Gaming World	Vengeance of the Kilrathi 4.5/5
Dragon	Vengeance of the Kilrathi 5/5

Award
Publication	Award
G4	#71 Top Video Game of All Time

Computer Gaming World in 1991 called Wing Commander II's story "mesmerizing" and the game "clearly excellent". The magazine concluded that it "flies right and plays not only on one's computer, but also on one's emotions". In a 1992 survey of science fiction games the magazine gave the title five of five stars, calling it "a sequel worthy of the name", with improved graphics, story, and gameplay. That year the magazine named it one of the year's top four action games. A 1994 survey in the magazine of strategic space games set in the year 2000 and later gave the game four-plus stars out of five, stating that it was "probably the game responsible for putting the Sound Blaster on the map as the de facto standard for sound cards". The game received 5 out of 5 stars in 1992 in Dragon. In 2012, G4 TV ranked it as the 71st top video game of all time.

Jim Trunzo reviewed Wing Commander II in White Wolf #30 (Feb., 1992), rating it a 5 out of 5 and stated that "Wing Commander II gives you breath-taking 3D graphics and animation, a believable and immersing story and a terrific challenge. For space flight junkies, it doesn't get any better than this."

It was winner of the 1991 Origins Award for Best Fantasy or Science Fiction Computer Game.

== See also ==
- Deneb Sector
