= Wing Commander III: Heart of the Tiger =

1994 video game

- Developer: Origin Systems
- Publishers: Origin Systems; Electronic Arts Studios (PlayStation)
- Directors: Frank Savage (game); Chris Roberts (cutscenes)
- Producers: Chris Roberts (game); Donna Burkons (cutscenes)
- Designers: Tim Ray; Ben Potter; Jeff J. Shelton
- Programmers: Frank Savage; Frank Roan
- Artist: Chris Douglas
- Writers: Terry Borst; Frank De Palma
- Composer: George Oldziey
- Series: Wing Commander
- Platforms: DOS, Mac OS, 3DO, PlayStation
- Release: December 12, 1994: DOS, Mac OS; NA: December 12, 1994; EU: December 16, 1994 3DO; NA: July 1995 PlayStation; NA: March 28, 1996; EU: March 1996
- Genre: Space combat simulation
- Mode: Single-player

Wing Commander III: Heart of the Tiger is the third main game in Chris Roberts' Wing Commander science fiction space combat simulation video game series, developed and released by Origin Systems in December 1994. It was a departure from previous games in the series in that it uses extensive live action full-motion video to add an interactive movie-style presentation to the space combat gameplay, emphasized by its advertising slogan, "Don't watch the game, play the movie!". The game's more than two hours of video featured a number of prominent movie stars including Mark Hamill as Colonel Christopher "Maverick" Blair, Malcolm McDowell as Admiral Tolwyn, John Rhys-Davies as James "Paladin" Taggart and Thrakhath nar Kiranka, and Tom Wilson as Todd "Maniac" Marshall.

== Gameplay ==
Screenshot of typical first person gameplay while piloting a ship

Wing Commander is a space combat simulator intercut with live action cutscenes. Gameplay involves completing missions and destroying enemy craft. Wing Commander III dispensed with the issuing of medals after such missions and relied more on cutscenes to drive the story along, making much more use of CD technology. As the man giving the orders, Blair often gets to choose what ship he will fly, what missiles it will carry, and what wingman (wingmen) he will take with him. As in Wing Commander, some wingmen can be killed permanently in combat. Blair's own call sign remained customizable.

== Plot ==
The protagonist of the previous two games is officially assigned a name, Colonel Christopher Blair. Thrakhath nar Kiranka, Crown Prince of the hostile Kilrathi Empire, presides over the execution by disintegration of a group of Terran Confederation prisoners of war. One, however, is left alive: Blair's lover Colonel Jeannette "Angel" Devereaux, due to her status among the Kilrathi as a respected warrior. On the planet Vespus, Blair and Brigadier General James "Paladin" Taggart inspect the downed wreckage of the TCS Concordia. The carrier is a total loss.

It is the year 2669, and the Terran-Kilrathi War has been going for over thirty years, with no signs of stopping. Blair, by orders of Admiral Geoffrey Tolwyn, is transferred as Wing Commander to the TCS Victory, a Ranger-class carrier twice as old as Blair. Her captain, William Eisen, has been with her for many years, and is proud of his ship. There are a few old faces—Colonel Ralgha nar "Hobbes" Hhallas, and Major Todd "Maniac" Marshall, but all the other pilots and staff are people Blair has never met. Among those on board, Blair meets Lieutenant Robin "Flint" Peters and Chief Fighter Technician Rachel Coriolis.

The Victory is assigned to the Orsini System, away from the front. Shortly after Blair's arrival, test pilot Major Jace "Flash" Dillon arrives on board the Victory with his prototype warcraft, the F-103A Excalibur heavy fighter. When Flash fails to respond to an attack on the Victory, willfully napping through the crisis, Blair commandeers the Excalibur in defense of the Victory and, in an ensuing argument with Flash, accuses him of being a coward and repeatedly insinuates that he has no flying skills. This angers Flash who challenges Blair to a simulator duel. If Blair wins the duel, he forces Dillon to request reassignment to the Victory's flight wing. Immediately afterward the Victory is rerouted to the Locanda System, where the Kilrathi are deploying a potent pair of new weapons: the "Skipper" cruise missile, equipped with a cloaking device, and a genetically-engineered bioweapon for use against the Locanda colonies, the home of Flint. Blair and his wing are scrambled to defend Locanda against several of these missiles. Even if Blair destroys the missiles, Flint breaks formation and attacks the Kilrathi forces in an act of revenge. The player is given the option to follow her, though she returns safely in either case.

Thrakhath appears with a squadron of Pakthan bombers and taunts the Victory over subspace radio, calling Blair "the heart of the tiger"; the Confed pilots gather the Kilrathi have bestowed this name on him as a sign of respect. Admiral Tolwyn rendezvouses with the Victory, escorted by several destroyers. Tolwyn is responsible for the escort and defense of the TCS Behemoth, an extremely large vessel (essentially a titanic particle accelerator with engines) capable of destroying a planet. Following a successful field test of the Behemoth in the Loki system, the Victory jumps to Kilrah and Tolwyn prepares to use the Behemoth on the Kilrathi home world. Thrakhath's forces attack the Behemoth. A traitor aboard the Victory has transmitted targeting data to the Kilrathi revealing the Behemoth's weakpoints, and the Behemoth is destroyed. Thrakhath then challenges Blair in single combat. He taunts Blair with a recording showing how he personally disemboweled Angel after her colleagues were disintegrated. Blair's instinct is to accept, but Lt. Ted "Radio" Rollins warns him that the Victory is leaving the system. When he returns to the Victory, the player chooses between getting drunk or talking to Rachel about his loss. If Blair gets drunk, he must then fly an emergency scramble drunk, with the game controls not responding reliably, making combat virtually impossible.

After a retreat to the Alcor System, Paladin arrives. He reveals that before Angel was captured, she transmitted data indicating that the Kilrathi home world is seismically unstable. Paladin suggests a weapon called the Temblor Bomb which, if dropped in the right place, will cause the planet to shake itself to pieces. Before they can complete the bomb, Hobbes kills one of the Victory's pilots, Lt. Laurel "Cobra" Buckley, steals her fighter and makes for Kilrathi space with news of the planned T-Bomb attack. Blair has the choice of chasing him or letting him go. If he gives chase, he kills Hobbes, the carrier is attacked, and Lt. Mitchell "Vaquero" Lopez is killed in the fight. Either way, afterwards Blair finds Hobbes left a message locker, explaining that he was brainwashed long before he met Blair, and this brainwashing led him to defect to the Confederation. His original personality was reactivated by the code phrase "heart of the tiger", the Kilrathi name for Blair.

Blair has the option to choose to initiate a romance with Flint or Rachel. Flint refuses to fly with him if he chooses Rachel, Rachel refuses to help him with his missile loadouts if he chooses Flint, and both are bitter with him if he chooses neither. Blair launches against Kilrah, with up to three wingmen of the player's choice. This attack comes just as the Kilrathi prepare for a massive and devastating strike against Earth, intending to finally force humanity into submission with the loss of their home planet. After successfully downing Prince Thrakhath above Kilrah (and Hobbes, if he was not killed earlier), Blair descends to the surface and delivers the bomb. The resulting explosion destroys Kilrah and wipes out nearly the entire Kilrathi armada assembled in orbit, but damages Blair's fighter as well; a surviving Kilrathi capital ship tractors him in. Morally devastated by the destruction of their home planet, the Kilrathi, commanded now by Thrakhath's retainer Melek nar Kiranka, surrender to Tolwyn. The surviving Kilrathi begin to colonize a new homeworld and now want to live in peace and harmony with humans while Blair and his romantic interest make plans to start their new lives together.

== Cast ==
- Mark Hamill as Colonel Christopher "Maverick" Blair
- Malcolm McDowell as Admiral Tolwyn
- John Rhys-Davies as Thrakhath Nar Kiranka (voice) / James "Paladin" Taggart
- Jason Bernard as Captain William Eisen
- Tom Wilson as Major Todd "Maniac" Marshall
- Ginger Lynn Allen as Rachel Coriolis
- Jennifer MacDonald as Lieutenant Robin "Flint" Peters
- Courtney Gains as Lieutenant Ted "Radio" Rollins
- François Chau as Lieutenant Winston "Vagabond" Chang
- B.J. Jefferson as Lieutenant Laurel "Cobra" Buckley
- Josh Lucas as Major Jace "Flash" Dillon
- Julian Reyes as Lieutenant Mitchell "Vaquero" Lopez
- Yolanda Jilot as Colonel Jeannette "Angel" Devereaux
- Barbara Niven as Barbara Miles
- Tim Curry as Melek Nar Kiranka (voice)
- Alan Mandell as Emperor (voice)
- John Schuck as Ralgha Nar "Hobbes" Hhallas (voice)

== Development ==
Wing Commander III: Heart of the Tiger was developed and released by Origin Systems. It was released in 1994 for DOS and Mac OS, in 1995 for 3DO, and in 1996 for PlayStation. A Sega Saturn version was also announced and advertised, but not released. Wing Commander III made the move from the sprite-based graphics used in previous titles to software-driven texture-mapped polygonal 3D, and used FMV for cutscenes. Wing Commander III featured an entirely new line of ships and fighters, abandoning the technology of Wing Commander and Wing Commander II. Terran Confederation craft were redesigned from "airplanes in space", while Kilrathi craft were totally redesigned into asymmetrical ships with prongs, barbs and fang-like surfaces. The new, blockier forms were made necessary by the then-primitive state of polygon graphics, as WCIII was released a few years before the first true 3D video cards, requiring all 3D effects to be calculated by the CPU.

Wing Commander III ultimately cost between $4 million and $5 million to develop. Adjusted for inflation, this is equivalent to between $9–11 million today.

FMV was filmed entirely via chroma key, with actors against green screens and all sets created digitally in post-production.

A number of branching ("interactive") conversations allow the player to choose what response his character will give; the choice may affect the other person's attitude towards the character, or even the morale of the entire crew. As such movie content consumes a large amount of data storage, the game was packaged on four CD-ROMs instead of floppy disks, another emerging technology at that point.

A Pentium (then a very high-end processor) was required to get optimum performance out of Wing Commander III. Roberts said, "We're not afraid to lead hardware sales a little, and we believe that Pentium will soon be the standard."

In June 1995, Atari Corporation realized a deal with EA to bring select titles to the Atari Jaguar CD, with Wing Commander III among the selected games. This port was never released due to the commercial and critical failure of the Atari Jaguar platform.

A novelization by William R. Forstchen and Andrew Keith was published in 1995. A collectible card game adaptation was published in the same year by Mag Force 7 Productions, under the helm of noted science-fiction authors Margaret Weis and Don Perrin. The sequel, Wing Commander IV: The Price of Freedom, was released in 1996.

After the end of the official support by Origin the fan community began to provide support for the game themselves. For instance, the community developed several unofficial patches to enhance the compatibility with newer versions of Windows and newer PC hardware.

In September 2011, the source code of Wing Commander III was handed to the fan community by a former developer for the purpose of digital long-time preservation.

On September 13, 2011 WC III was re-released on gog.com via digital distribution.

== Version differences ==
A number of major changes were made in porting the game to the 3DO. These include:

- Difficulty select was removed; the game can only be played at one difficulty, which roughly corresponds to "Veteran" in the PC version.
- All stages set on planetary surfaces are cut, and replaced with Full Motion Video cutscenes. Staple mission audio clips (e.g. "Attack my target") are used for the dialogue in these scenes.
- Manual takeoffs are similarly replaced by FMVs. The player starts each mission in open space.
- The left VDU cannot be made invisible.
- Several enemy types were removed, including all land-based enemies.
- A new enemy was added, the gun platform. This enemy is stationary.
- The ejection animation was cut, as was the option to retry the mission after ejecting.
- The player must select a ship as a target in order to communicate with it.
- The bug which prevents the player from accessing the cutscene explaining Hobbes' betrayal in the PC version is absent.
- There is a new bug in the first Hyperion mission. Unless all enemies in the mission are destroyed, this mission will register as failed, regardless of whether or not the player successfully used the bomb prototype.
- Only two of the three possible endings of the PC version are accessible. This is because the removal of the planetary sequence makes it impossible to fail the mission in which the Temblor Bomb is planted.
- The scripted deaths of the pilots in the Temblor Bomb mission were cut. Thus, it is possible to complete the mission with all four wingmen remaining.
- The cloaking device works on Hobbes and Thrakhath, and thus the Temblor Bomb mission may be completed without fighting either of them.

The PlayStation version is much more similar to the PC version, though like the 3DO version it does not carry the bug which blocks off the Hobbes cutscene. Also, unlike either the PC or 3DO versions, it includes considerable load times when navigating the Victory.

== Novelization ==
While mostly following the plot outlined above, authors Keith and Forstchen made a number of decisions and changes to increase the tension of the novel:

- Blair's Gold Squadron flies Thunderbolts exclusively before transferring over to the new Excaliburs. Green Squadron runs the Longbows, Red Squadron has Hellcats (misprinted as Arrow Interceptors in the book) and Blue Squadron flies Arrows.
- Flash arrives, not as a test pilot for the Excalibur, but from the Locanda system as a replacement contributed from a Home Defense squadron. He retains his "hotshot" mindset and rank of major, however.
- Blair fails to save Locanda.
- Forstchen-created character Kevin "Lone Wolf" Tolwyn makes an appearance as a courier, preparing the Victory for the admiral's arrival. Lone Wolf, now a major, declines to join Blair's wing only because it would pain his uncle.
- Thrakhath's declaration that Blair is the "Heart of the Tiger" occurs while the pilots are in their cockpits, scrambling to defend the Behemoth, instead of standing on the Victory's bridge. Flash, flying on Hobbes' wing, is killed in the ensuing fight.
- Since Hobbes knows about the Temblor bomb project, there is no question of allowing him to escape. Hobbes uses voice recordings to impersonate Buckley, but when Vaquero (Cobra's wingman) hears what has happened, he engages Hobbes, as per Blair's orders, and is killed just as Maverick arrives.
- Blair chooses Rachel.
- Flint, Winston "Vagabond" Chang and Maniac, the only living Gold Squadron pilots at this point in the novel, fly with him to Kilrah. Vagabond is shot down on the second leg of the journey (though he survives through unspecified means to return in Wing Commander IV: The Price of Freedom), Flint is killed in space above Kilrah, and Maniac is shot down in the planet's atmosphere. Maniac would also return in Wing Commander IV.

== Reception ==
Reception

Review scores
Publication	Score
AllGame	Macintosh: 4.5/5; 3DO: 4/5
Computer Gaming World	PC: 5/5
Electronic Gaming Monthly	3DO: 7.5/10
Game Informer	PlayStation: 8.5/10
Next Generation	3DO: 5/5
PC Gamer (US)	PC: 96%
Maximum	PlayStation: 3/5
MacUser	4/5
CD Player	3DO: 8/10; PC: 8/10

Wing Commander III: Heart of the Tiger was another major hit for the Wing Commander series, the PC versions alone selling over 500,000 copies. It sold over 700,000 copies in total. PC Data, which tracked computer game sales in the United States, reported that Wing Commander III's computer version earned $15.9 million and sold roughly 400,000 copies by October 1999.

A critic for Next Generation gave the 3DO version five out of five stars, chiefly praising the usage of big-name actors in the video cutscenes, which he argued makes the game more realistic and suspenseful and gives a sense that the FMV is enhancing gameplay rather than substituting for a lack thereof. While he noted that the 3DO version lacks the graphical sharpness of the PC version and is less challenging, he concluded that it "makes a more than acceptable alternative" for players who cannot afford the expensive hardware required to run the PC version at optimal settings. The four reviewers of Electronic Gaming Monthly focused their praise on the high quality of the FMV, which both Al Manuel and Sushi-X said was the cleanest FMV yet seen on either the 3DO or the PC. Ed Semrad and Sushi-X criticized that the control scheme is difficult to master.

James V. Trunzo reviewed Wing Commander III: Heart of the Tiger in White Wolf Inphobia #56 (June, 1995), rating it a 5 out of 5 and stated that "Wing Commander III is quite simply the most stunning game around. It does what other CD-ROM products only promise, and by doing so ups the ante for every game to come. A sure Hall of Famer, Wing Commander III is the ultimate gaming experience."

Reviewing the PlayStation version, a reviewer for Maximum praised the "intricate" plot but criticized that the combat is simplistic and dull and that the FMV sequences lack any interaction beyond the occasional multiple choice response.

Entertainment Weekly gave the game an A.

=== Accolades ===
The editors of PC Gamer US nominated Wing Commander III for their 1994 "Best Action Game" award, although it lost to TIE Fighter. In 1995, the game was awarded the 3DO Interactive Movie of the Year. In 1996, Computer Gaming World ranked it as the 54th best game of all time for its "thrilling space action in the first successful interactive movie", and the ninth most innovative computer game. In 2011, PC Gamer ranked it 72nd on the list of the 100 best PC games of all time.
