= Wing Commander IV: The Price of Freedom =

1996 video game

Wing Commander IV
- Developer: Origin Systems
- Publisher: Electronic Arts
- Directors: Anthony Morone (game); Chris Roberts (cutscenes)
- Producers: Mark Day; Dallas Snell (game)
- Designers: Ben Potter; Jeff Shelton; Scott Shelton
- Programmer: Frank Roan
- Artists: Jeffery Combs; Chris Douglas
- Writers: Terry Borst; Frank De Palma
- Composer: George Oldziey
- Series: Wing Commander
- Platforms: MS-DOS, Windows, Classic Mac OS, PlayStation
- Release: MS-DOS, Windows, Mac: NA: February 8, 1996; EU: 1996; PlayStation: NA: May 14, 1997; EU: June 1997
- Genre: Space combat simulator
- Mode: Single-player

Wing Commander IV: The Price of Freedom is the fourth main game in the Wing Commander space combat simulator series. It was developed by Origin Systems and released by Electronic Arts for MS-DOS, Windows, and Classic Mac OS in 1996 and the PlayStation in 1997. It was re-released via the North American PlayStation Network Store in 2009, and released on Steam in 2026 with restored cutscenes.

The first game set after the end of the Terran-Kilrathi War, Wing Commander IV depicts a galaxy in the midst of a chaotic transition, with human civilians, Kilrathi survivors and former soldiers on both sides attempting to restabilize their lives. A novelization, by William R. Forstchen and Ben Ohlander, was published on October 1, 1996.

== Gameplay ==
Wing Commander IV is a simulator game in which players take on the role of Col. Christopher "Maverick" Blair, a veteran pilot of enormous repute, as he flies starfighters. Players are presented with a series of missions, and must complete (or at least survive) them to progress the plot.

Cockpit view

In between missions, the player controls Blair aboard a carrier, initially the TCS Lexington, during which he may engage in conversations with other characters. These conversations are portrayed in FMV cut scenes. At the player's discretion, Blair may undertake a mission briefing, delivered by the ship's captain, and then select his wingman and fighter craft. Each fighter comes with qualities such as durability, maneuverability, top speed, mounted energy weapons, and number of available missile hardpoints, whose loadouts may be specified by the player. Upon completing the mission, Blair lands at the carrier to repeat the cycle again.

Starfighter combat revolves around close-in dogfights with ships' guns as their primary weapon. Missiles may be used, and ECM used to defend against them; each fighter has a limited supply of both. Every fighter has shields, which regenerate over time, as well as vehicle armor, which does not. An attacker must penetrate both layers of defenses to destroy the fighter. Each fighter also has a limited energy pool from which to fire its guns; while this, too, regenerates, the gap in firing patterns may be long enough for the defending fighter to re-establish its shields. In emergencies, pilots may use ejection seats to escape their craft.

Blair may select his wingmen from amongst a number of non-player characters. Wingman have different flying styles and performances in combat, from their skill at maneuvering to their marksmanship to the likelihood with which they will accept Blair's orders.

The game includes a large number of branching conversations in which the players must choose which response Blair will give. The choice may affect the other person's attitude toward Blair, the morale of the entire crew, the player's next assignment and the game's ending.

== Plot ==
The war between the alien Kilrathi Empire and the Terran Confederation has been over for several years. Confed is attempting to stabilize its economy and social structure. The Kilrathi survivors, now led by Melek nar Kiranka, retainer to the late Prince Thrakhath, are having greater problems than they had during the war, since their racial and societal makeup revolves around hunting and killing. Tension between the Confederation and the Union of Border Worlds has deepened, most recently with an attack on an unarmed medical transport. This transport is destroyed by a wing of mysterious fighters equipped with a new anti-ship weapon that incinerates the target's contents, leaving only a burning shell behind.

James 'Paladin' Taggart, a senior governor of the Assembly, declares that the Assembly must cast a vote on whether or not to declare war on the Border Worlds, with Admiral Geoffrey Tolwyn assigned to a fact-finding mission which will essentially decide the issue. Colonel Christopher 'Maverick' Blair, retired, is trying to make out a living on a desert world as a farmer, when he is recalled to active military service by Tolwyn. Within five minutes of Blair taking the cockpit, the station he's heading to is attacked by an Avenger-class fighter claiming Border Worlds allegiance. Border Worlds claims that similar strikes that have occurred on their ships are ignored. Tolwyn assigns Blair to the TCS Lexington with the task of unraveling these tensions and getting to the bottom of the story. Blair is reunited with Lexington's new Captain William Eisen, Major Todd 'Maniac' Marshall, and Lieutenant Winston 'Vagabond' Chang. Blair also meets Lieutenant Troy 'Catscratch' Carter, a Kilrathiphobe who joined the military a couple of years too late.

Blair can find no concrete evidence, and no one can positively identify the harassing ships. Tolwyn transfers a new officer to the Lex, Captain Hugh Paulsen, who replaces Eisen in command. After flying sorties under Paulsen's command, Blair either heads to the officer's lounge with Maniac or ventures down to the flight deck without proper authorization. If Blair heads to the lounge, Maniac abruptly leaves him at the lounge bar remembering "something he has to do." If Blair sneaks onto the flight deck, he witnesses Seether arriving in a shuttle and meeting Paulsen. Soon after, Paulsen calls Blair and Chang in for a surprise mission briefing: Eisen has defected to the Border Worlds and is fleeing in a shuttle, with Maniac piloting. Once in space, Vagabond announces that he is going to follow Eisen over. If Blair does not defect, he returns to the Lexington to meet a new cadre of pilots brought in by Paulsen. Blair flies with them for several missions before being confronted with a Border Worlds attack, led by Maniac, who gives Blair another chance to come over.

If Blair defects with Vagabond, he arrives with Eisen, Maniac, Vagabond and Catscratch at the BWS Intrepid, an old Durango-class carrier that has recently suffered damage from a Confed attack. Much of the senior staff has been killed, including Eisen's contact (and old friend) Captain Dominguez. The two officers currently sharing the command, Colonels Jacob 'Hawk' Manley and Tamara 'Panther' Farnsworth, assign Blair as Wing Commander for the flight group, and Eisen becomes her captain. Other Intrepid natives include Chief Technician Robert "Pliers" Sykes, Colonel John 'Gash' Dekker, head of the ship's contingent of Marines; and communications technician Lieutenant Velina Sosa, whom Catscratch quickly takes a shine to. Eisen confides that he's been in touch with connections back on Earth, and it seems that the nascent Confed-Border Worlds war is being instigated by elements within Confed. He defected so that he could hunt for proof of this. Blair and Maniac succeed in downing the Lexington, though Paulsen escapes in a shuttle with Seether. Seether kills Paulsen for his failure.

Pliers comes up with a jerry-rigged cloaking device and a "Manned Insertion Pod" - a coffin-sized torpedo that can be used to land ground troops. Blair takes them in against a communications station in the Orestes System, where Sosa and Vagabond collect valuable data on the conspiracy. Vagabond is killed in the gunfight.

Blair picks up a distress signal from the Kilrathi Melek and rescues the convoy. Melek brings flight recorder data of the sleek black ships using their incineration weapon against a Kilrathi transport. One of the ships pulls a move that Blair saw in the attack on the space port, using the ship's afterburners to supercharge and detonate an explosive mine which pushes the ship away at a faster rate. Hawk tells them that when he signed on with Confed, there was a rookie pilot on his ship, call sign 'Seether', who could pull off the maneuver. He also informs them that there was some talk of a 'G.E.' program, but that he never found out what it was, and Seether was transferred from the flight roster to Confed Intelligence Operations. Eisen leaves the Intrepid, intent on returning to Earth and delivering the information to friends in high places; he leaves Blair as acting captain reporting to Border Worlds Rear Admiral Eugene Wilford. Finally, the Intrepid catches wind of a secret Confed freighter sneaking through the area. Blair subdues it so that Dekker and his boys can capture it. Pliers, clambering aboard in the aftermath, discovers a squadron of sleek black fighters and a single example of their incendiary weapon, called "Dragons" and "Flash-Paks" respectively.

The Telamon system is under biological attack. The vast majority of the colony, particularly planet FT957, has died. Few survive the attacks, hale and untouched, evidently due to an innate immunity. The survivors at the colony recount that visiting Dragons dropped canisters containing a biological weapon. Blair traces the attacking Dragons to the Axius System, which he infiltrates. There he discovers a secret starbase, guarded by the TCS Vesuvius, and manned by thousands of black-clad soldiers, including Seether, collectively known as the Black Lance. Blair learns that their leader is Admiral Geoffrey Tolwyn, who is instigating a war between the Border Worlds and Confed, with the goal being constant war-driven evolution of tactics and technology, to prepare the Confederation to meet the next hostile alien race. The Gen-Select Bioweapon, recently tested at Telamon, is the next obvious step in the plan: a virus that kills off all but the most genetically superior. Blair is spied by Seether and forced to fight his way out.

The Intrepid, pursued by the Vesuvius and Tolwyn's Black Lance pilots, makes a run toward Earth, intending to stop Tolwyn from addressing Congress. Though helped by the intervention of the TCS Mount St. Helens, sister ship to the Vesuvius, and its new captain, Eisen, the Intrepid is unsuccessful in stopping Tolwyn. Blair duels Seether one-on-one above Earth and then lands at the Congressional Building.

Tolwyn delivers his report on the Border Worlds and Blair slips in. If Blair makes a silent entrance, Tolwyn alerts the chamber guards to arrest Blair and he is not given a chance to speak, instead being executed. If Blair instead chooses to make a dramatic entrance, Paladin gives him the chance to speak before the Assembly. Blair baits Tolwyn into revealing his true agenda and admitting his crimes.

If the player scores enough points against Tolwyn, the Senate votes against war. Tolwyn is then indicted and convicted for his actions; lacking an appeal, he hangs himself in his jail cell, rather than be executed. Blair will either regain his rank as Colonel and be seen helping Panther train new pilots at the BWS Intrepid or using Black Lance assets to crush rebellions with Hawk at his side as the new Admiral, depending on the general tone of his choices throughout the game. If the player makes the wrong choices facing Tolwyn, Blair is convicted of treason and executed as the war begins. This also happens if at any time Blair is captured by Confederation forces after his defection. If Blair fails enough missions before his defection, he is simply sent back to his farm.

== Cast ==
- Mark Hamill as Christopher 'Maverick' Blair
- John Rhys-Davies as James 'Paladin' Taggart
- Malcolm McDowell as Admiral Geoffrey Tolwyn
- Jason Bernard as William Eisen
- Tom Wilson as Todd 'Maniac' Marshall
- François Chau as Winston 'Vagabond' Chang
- Mark Dacascos as Troy 'Catscratch' Carter
- John Spencer as Captain Hugh Paulsen
- Robert Rusler as Seether
- Chris Mulkey as Colonel Jacob 'Hawk' Manley
- Elizabeth Barondes as Tamara 'Panther' Farnsworth
- Richard Riehle as Robert "Pliers" Sykes
- Jeremy Roberts as Colonel John 'Gash' Dekker
- Holly Gagnier as Lieutenant Velina Sosa
- Casper Van Dien as Confed Redshirt #3
- Walton Goggins as Border World Pilot

== Development and release ==
Initially targeted for a December 1995 release (thus giving the game an aggressive 12-month development schedule), the game was ultimately released on February 8, 1996 for MS-DOS PCs. WCIV was produced on the then-unheard-of-for-a-video-game budget of US$12 million. The majority of this budget went into the production of the game's full motion video scenes, which were shot on actual sets instead of a greenscreen and using 35mm film instead of digital capture. The original MS-DOS edition shipped on six CD-ROMs.

Origin later released a native-client for Windows 95. The Windows client added a deinterlace-option to improve the appearance of the cutscenes, but was identical to the original MS-DOS game in all other respects. In 1997, a special DVD-ROM edition of the game was released. In this edition, the cutscene video was upgraded to full DVD quality (made possible due to the fact that the scenes were originally shot on film). As most PCs of the time were insufficiently powerful to play the MPEG2 DVD video, the game client relied on Windows 95's multimedia player to stream the video from DVD to a hardware decoder. This dependency on external hardware rendered the game unplayable outside Windows PCs equipped with the correct decoder board. Hence, the game was strategically bundled with DVD-ROM kits that included the necessary decoder hardware. Later, the gaming community developed fan-made patches to allow this version to play on more modern hardware where no hardware-based MPEG2 decoding was available (or necessary). There was also a separate DVD release which lacked the enhanced video, and was hence playable on all PCs capable of playing the original CD-ROM release.

Unlike Wing Commander III, the PlayStation version of Wing Commander IV was not a direct port; much of the graphics were redone, the collision detection was modified, and the controls were simplified by making certain actions automated, though a control scheme similar to that of the PC version is also an option. In addition, in order to fit the game on four CDs (as compared to the six CDs of the PC version), some of the transitional FMVs were cut. A 3DO Interactive Multiplayer version was announced to be in development but it was never released. Likewise, a port for the Panasonic M2 was in the works by Origin Systems and slated to be one of the console's launch titles but never happened due to its eventual cancellation.

On April 3, 2012, the DVD quality version of the game was made available as a digital download at Good Old Games.

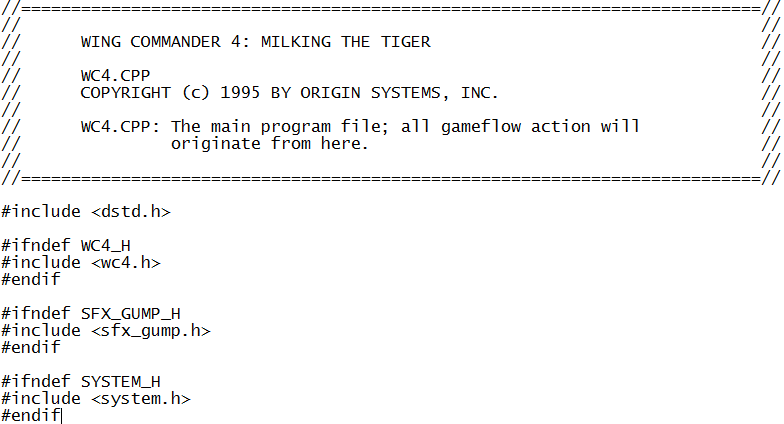
First lines of the WC4 source code as it became available to the WC community in 2012

Also in April 2012, the source code was handed to the game community by a former developer for the purpose of long-time preservation. The codename was Milking The Tiger.

In 2021, a fan project known as Wing Commander IV: Remastered, began development of a version using upscaled video assets from the original series with the goal of producing a modern remake of the game.

== Reception ==
=== Sales ===
PC Data, which tracked computer game sales in the United States, ranked Wing Commander IV at #1 for the month of February 1996. It was the 11th-best-selling game of 1996's first six months, but was absent from the year-end top 20, according to Computer Games Magazine. The game sold above 200,000 units across Europe by February 1997, and ultimately received a "Gold" award from the Verband der Unterhaltungssoftware Deutschland (VUD) in August 1998, for sales of at least 100,000 units across Germany, Austria and Switzerland. In the United States, PC Data reported that the game earned $7.9 million and sold roughly 170,000 copies by October 1999. According to CNET Gamecenter's Mark Asher, the game "made back its $10 million development, but barely."

=== Critical reviews ===
Reception

Aggregate score
Aggregator	Score
GameRankings	83.75% (PC); 66.44% (PS)

Review scores
Publication	Score
AllGame	4/5 (PC); 3/5 (PS1)
Electronic Gaming Monthly	7.625/10 (PS)
Game Informer	7.75/10 (PS)
GameSpot	8.5/10 (PC); 8.1/10 (PS)
Next Generation	4/5 (PC); 2/5 (PS)
Entertainment Weekly	A− (PC)
Maximum	4/5 (PC)
MacUser	3/5
PC Games	B

Wing Commander IV: The Price of Freedom for the PC was well received by critics. Computer Gaming World had it as a runner-up for the "Space Simulation Game of the Year" award, adding that it was the best yet attempt at creating an 'interactive movie'. In GameSpot's 1996 annual awards, the game placed second in the category "Best Story". Daniel Jevons of Maximum opined that "Wing Commander IV makes huge leaps and bounds in the interactive movie stakes, seamlessly blending impressive interactive cinematic sequences with slick and exciting SVGA battle sequences." A reviewer for Next Generation criticized that the interactive portions are essentially unchanged from Wing Commander III: "... with $10 million [the game's budget], you'd think the programmers could have optimized the code. They could have added tons of features: replays, multiplayer support, more ships, or even more interactivity. ... the actual gameplay, which runs on exactly the same engine as WCIII (with only a few improvements), runs almost half as fast at even the lowest resolution – with all the details turned off." However, he assessed this as more of a lost opportunity than an actual problem, since "WCIII was a great game, and it's nice to get more of the same." Bob Strauss wrote in Entertainment Weekly that "I've come to the conclusion that the Wing Commander series has two reasons for existence: to prolong the career of Mark Hamill (who has leveraged his big-screen space-jockey credentials into this most prestigious of CD-ROM franchises) and to force technological laggards to trade in their old PC clunkers for the whiz-bang models of the moment. There's nothing in Wing Commander IV: The Price of Freedom to dissuade me from this opinion."

Wing Commander IV was nominated as Computer Games Strategy Plus's 1996 "Science-Fiction Simulation" of the year, although it lost to Terra Nova: Strike Force Centauri. It won the 1996 Spotlight Award for "Best Use of Video" from the Game Developers Conference, and was a nominee in the "Best Script, Story or Interactive Writing" category. Inside Mac Games named it 1996's best space simulation.

Reaction to the PlayStation version was more mixed. Critics generally approved of the cutscenes, praising the story, acting, and full motion video quality, but assessed the gameplay as average at best. The chief complaint was that the sensitivity of the controls makes it excessively difficult to track enemies or fine-tune the ship's heading. Trent Ward noted in GameSpot that though the control is dramatically improved when using the PlayStation Analog Joystick, this controller was not due to be released in the U.S. for another two months. Both Ward and the review team for Electronic Gaming Monthly argued that the gameplay issues are irrelevant due to the quality of the cutscenes; Shawn Smith of EGM remarked, "WC4 is an example of packaging done so well, that you can't help but enjoy the game underneath." In contrast, Next Generation and GamePro said that while the cutscenes are excellent of themselves, they ultimately detract from the game due to their excessive length, forcing the player to spend a large share of their time watching video instead of playing the game. Next Generation summarized the game as "a last gasp of the failed FMV subgenre."

Crispin Boyer of EGM devoted his entire PlayStation version review to the quality of the conversion, commenting that whereas Wing Commander III was a straight port, Wing Commander IV had been effectively redesigned to accommodate the hardware, in particular simplifying the control scheme and redrawing the HUDs so that they can be read on the lower resolution of a TV monitor. Next Generation, however, contended that the 3DO and PlayStation versions of Wing Commander III had much better tuned controls.
