= Wing Commander Arena =

2007 video game

- Developer: Gaia Industries
- Publisher: Electronic Arts
- Series: Wing Commander
- Platform: Xbox 360
- Release: WW: July 25, 2007
- Genre: Space combat simulator
- Modes: Single-player, multiplayer

Wing Commander Arena is a space combat simulator video game developed by independent software developer Gaia Industries for the Xbox 360's Xbox Live Arcade service. It is a spin-off of the popular Wing Commander series of games. The game was released on July 25, 2007.

== Gameplay ==
Players engage in dogfights that take place in one of nine environments, and they are able to choose from 18 ships, half being Terran, and the other half Kilrathi. There can be up to 16 players in a single match.

The game is separated into single-player and multiplayer modes. Multiplayer modes include eight-on-eight teamplay or 16 player free-for-all, capship battles allowing two teams to launch an organized assault on each other's ship while defending their own, "Satellite", which is a variation of capture the flag, and one-on-one duels. There is also a "Bearpit" where one-on-one duels can be watched from the sidelines by other players who can take potshots at the duelers.

Single player modes include Asteroids, Training Modes and Melees. Playing through the single player modes will unlock the various ship types.

== Relation to previous Wing Commander games ==
Arena's gameplay differs from previous Wing Commander installments. Rather than using a first-person perspective cockpit used throughout the series, Arena is played from a top-down perspective on a 2D plane with the third axis reserved for special maneuvers, using a control scheme that resembles a first-person shooter.

The producer, Sean Penney, is a longtime fan of the franchise. Early in development, Electronic Arts sought input from members of the original Wing Commander development team, such as Chris Roberts, and from the Wing Commander online community.

== Reception ==
IGN rated the game 4.9/10 Metacritic rated the game 51/100.
