= Wing Commander Academy (video game) =

1993 video game

- Developer: Origin Systems
- Publisher: Origin Systems
- Producers: Thomas Blom; Dallas Snell
- Programmers: Jeff Everett; Brent Allen Thale
- Artists: Whitney Ayres; Glen Johnson
- Composers: John Tipton; Kirk Winterrowd
- Series: Wing Commander
- Platform: DOS
- Release: August 1993
- Genre: Space combat simulation
- Mode: Single-player

Wing Commander Academy is a spin-off of Wing Commander II: Vengeance of the Kilrathi, published in 1993.

== Reception ==
Computer Gaming World in 1993 stated of Wing Commander Academy that "if you enjoy space combat simulations, you must have this game. Period". The magazine approved of the "absolute ball to play" game's improved graphics, and the mission builder, and concluded that "Academy is a tremendously exciting game, one which provides many, many hours of play and replay". The 1994 survey gave the game three stars out of five, stating that it was "for those who don't need a plot".

James Trunzo reviewed Wing Commander Academy in White Wolf #39 (1994), giving it a final evaluation of "Good" and stated that "For those among you who yearn for hot and heavy galactic dog-fights, and don't want to waste time with convoluted plots and pretty but time-wasting graphic interludes, WC Academy puts all your skills to the test."
