= Wing Commander (franchise) =

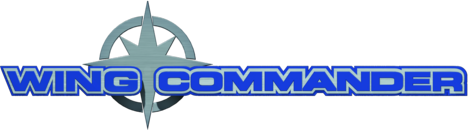
- Logo as of Wing Commander: Prophecy
- Genre: Space flight simulator
- Developer: Origin Systems
- Publishers: Origin Systems; Electronic Arts
- Creator: Chris Roberts
- First release: Wing Commander; September 1990
- Latest release: Wing Commander Arena; July 25, 2007

Wing Commander is a media franchise consisting of space combat simulation video games from Origin Systems, Inc., an animated television series, a feature film, a collectible card game, a series of novels, and action figures. The franchise originated in 1990 with the release of the video game Wing Commander.

== Setting and gameplay ==
Set in the 27th century, the games tell the story of humanity's war against the Kilrathi, an alien species of large feline bipeds. The Kilrathi are native to the planet Kilrah with their society depicted as an empire. Physically they are bipeds who strongly resemble big Earth cats. They have leonine manes, and markings which distinguish their clan of origin. The species is featured in every game, with later games revealing more complex characters than a mindless enemy. Later games moved on from the Kilrathi war setting, with Wing Commander IV: The Price of Freedom being about a conspiracy within the ranks and Wing Commander: Prophecy and Secret Ops telling the battles against a new enemy known as the Nephilim.

The player represents the Terran Confederation, the primary human government in the Wing Commander series. The Terran Confederation is an alliance of systems and regional governments which provide unified protection and economic growth. Launching from carrier ships, the player fulfills various missions in space fighter aircraft. The games were all notable for their storytelling through extensive cutscenes. Starting with Wing Commander III, every game (excluding Secret Ops) contained cutscenes that incorporated live action filming, starring several major Hollywood actors, including John Rhys-Davies, Mark Hamill, Thomas F. Wilson and Malcolm McDowell, as well as Christopher Walken, John Hurt, and Clive Owen in Privateer 2: The Darkening.

== Games ==
Release timeline Main series in bold
1990	**Wing Commander**
1990	Wing Commander: The Secret Missions
1991	Wing Commander: The Secret Missions 2 - Crusade
1991	**Wing Commander II: Vengeance of the Kilrathi**
1991	Wing Commander II: Special Operations
1992	Wing Commander II: Special Operations 2
1993	Wing Commander Academy
1993	Wing Commander: Privateer
1994	Wing Commander: Privateer - Righteous Fire
1994	Super Wing Commander
1994	Wing Commander: Armada
1994	**Wing Commander III: Heart of the Tiger**
1994	Wing Commander: Armada - Proving Grounds
1995
1996	**Wing Commander IV: The Price of Freedom**
1996	Privateer 2: The Darkening
1997	**Wing Commander: Prophecy**
1998	Wing Commander: Secret Ops
1999
2000
2001
2002
2003
2004
2005
2006
2007	Wing Commander Arena

The Wing Commander game series began in 1990 with Wing Commander. The newest addition to the series, Wing Commander Arena, was released for the Xbox Live Arcade service on July 25, 2007.

=== Wing Commander ===
The player begins his tour of duty as a young space fighter pilot on the carrier TCS Tiger's Claw. The player can set this character's name and callsign in the first games in the franchise. As of Wing Commander III, the protagonist is given the canonical name Christopher "Maverick" Blair. Through the player's heroic efforts, the Confederation is able to destroy the Kilrathi's sector headquarters and drive them from the Vega sector. Through the course of the Vega campaign, the player can gain numerous promotions and medals and fly in various squadrons, each featuring a different fighter. The game was notable for its innovative and seldom-repeated "campaign tree" structure, whereby the "path" the player took on the way to the end would be determined by the player's performance on preceding missions. In-game cinematics in "newsreel" format reflected the success or failure of the player and the Claw.

Originally announced as Squadron, the name was changed to Wingleader shortly into development; however, trademark issues forced a name change to Wing Commander at the last moment. The development team's nickname for the otherwise-unnamed protagonist was "Bluehair", due to his unusual shade of hair. Perhaps in a nod to this in-joke, when the character was given an actual name in later installments, Origin chose "Blair", a shortened version of the old nickname. Wing Commander was ported to the Amiga, FM Towns, SNES, Mega-CD, Amiga CD32, 3DO, Mac OS, and PlayStation Portable systems, the most ports of any Wing Commander game. In the Sega CD port which added voice acting, the player character was given the callsign of "Hotshot" to allow him to be addressed by voice.

In 1991, Wing Commander won the Origins Award for Best Fantasy or Science Fiction Computer Game of 1990.

==== The Secret Missions ====
A new Kilrathi secret weapon destroys the Terran colony of Goddard. In retribution, the Confederation plans a daring raid, Operation Thor's Hammer. Tiger's Claw must follow the Kilrathi deep into their own territory and destroy their new super weapon, the dreadnought Sivar.

The Secret Missions was ported to the FM Towns, SNES, Sony PSP (as part of the EA Replay bundle), and was included with Wing Commander on the 3DO and Macintosh as part of Super Wing Commander.

==== The Secret Missions 2: Crusade ====
When the Confederation is just celebrating a new alliance with the bird-like native species of the planet Firekka, they learn that entire fleets of Kilrathi ships are leaving from other sectors and heading towards the Firekka system. Concerned, but massively outnumbered, the Confederation ships must retreat, but they soon learn from a Kilrathi defector that Firekka has been chosen as the place for a holy Kilrathi ceremony. The Confederation soon develops a plan to disrupt that ceremony in an act of terrorism meant to deliver a blow to enemy morale, and it is up to the pilots of Tiger's Claw to ensure the success of the mission.

The Secret Missions 2: Crusade was ported to the FM Towns.

==== Super Wing Commander ====
In 1994, a revamped version of the original Wing Commander, entitled Super Wing Commander (SWC), was released for the 3DO. It featured new graphics, full speech and included a Secret Missions 1.5 campaign (between the original campaigns 1 and 2) with a follow-up to Thor's Hammer in which the Claw destroys the Kilrathi shipyards that constructed the Sivar.

Super Wing Commander was ported to the Macintosh in 1995.

=== Wing Commander II: Vengeance of the Kilrathi ===
Shortly after the Firekka campaign, the Tiger's Claw attempts to attack the Kilrathi headquarters in the Enigma sector, but is ambushed by new Kilrathi "Strakha" stealth fighters and is lost. No one but Blair sees these fighters, so they are dismissed as an excuse to cover his cowardice. He is scapegoated for the loss of the Claw, is demoted to captain and transferred to a backwater space station. Ten years later, he is called back into action when he is able to save the Confederation's flagship, the TCS Concordia. Meeting many old friends there, he continues the fight against the Kilrathi, finally culminating in the destruction of their sector HQ, thus clearing his name and uncovering a traitor on the Concordia's flight decks, who was the mastermind behind the ambush and destruction of the Tiger's Claw.

Wing Commander II was ported to the FM Towns. In 1992, it won the Origins Award for Best Fantasy or Science Fiction Computer Game of 1991.

==== Special Operations 1 ====
Blair is transferred to the undercover Special Operations division, supporting Kilrathi colonies that are defecting from the Empire. But first he must solve the problem of a mutiny on a Confed cruiser.

==== Special Operations 2 ====
Jazz, the traitor from Wing Commander II, has fled imprisonment and the Mandarins (the society of traitors) are also able to steal some of the Confederation's newest top-secret fighters. Blair must hunt them down and face Jazz in one final showdown.

=== Wing Commander III: Heart of the Tiger ===
The war is going very badly for the Confederation, far worse than what the public (or the player) generally knows. Battles are lost on all fronts, casualties are mounting, and the Concordia is destroyed. Colonel Christopher Blair (the player from the first games, now with a set name), is transferred to the TCS Victory, an old ship from the first days of the war. In a last-ditch attempt to win the war, Confed has designed the TCS Behemoth, a doomsday weapon able to destroy an entire planet. It is Blair's mission to help end this war for good, by destroying the Kilrathi homeworld of Kilrah. Unfortunately the Behemoth is destroyed by Kilrathi forces. The enemy fighters seemed to know exactly about the weak points of the weapon. Later on Blair finds out that his old friend Hobbes, a Kilrathi defector, is a sleeper agent and the traitor responsible for the Confed's losses. The last hope of winning the war for the Confederation is a secret weapon, the "Temblor Bomb", using the tectonic instability of Kilrah to destroy the planet. Blair is finally able to attack Kilrah, firing the bomb and destroying the Kilrathi homeworld. With the royal family of Kilrah killed and their homeworld lost, Melek, once attaché to the Kilrathi prince, surrenders before Blair.

Wing Commander III was the first game in the series to use full motion video as opposed to animated cutscenes, and texture-mapped 3D instead of sprite-based graphics. The game features well-known actors such as Mark Hamill as Christopher Blair, John Rhys-Davies as James "Paladin" Taggart, Thomas F. Wilson as Todd "Maniac" Marshall, Malcolm McDowell as Admiral Geoffrey Tolwyn, Josh Lucas as "Flash", and Ginger Lynn as Chief Technician Rachel Coriolis.

Wing Commander III was ported to the PlayStation, Macintosh and the 3DO.

=== Wing Commander IV: The Price of Freedom ===
The war with the Kilrathi is over, but not all is well within the Confederation. Skirmishes in the Border Worlds destroy ships regularly. Both Confed and the Union of Border Worlds assign blame to each other and the skirmishes threaten to lead to all-out war. Blair is soon recalled to active duty and sent to the Border Worlds to confirm Confed's determination. But he finds out that a conspiracy of warmongers with members in the highest Confed circles are responsible for the attacks. Defecting to the Border Worlds, Blair must expose the conspiracy to help restore the peace in a galaxy still torn over the events of the Kilrathi-Terran War.

The Price of Freedom retained the storytelling-style of its predecessor, using live-action cutscenes with an ensemble cast of actors. Many of the actors from Wing Commander III returned to reprise their roles. The story's final sequence was innovative in that dialogue choices made by the player affected the outcome of the hearing. However, only three endings were possible, and two of the outcomes depended on the earlier choices made by the player.

Wing Commander IV was ported to the PlayStation and Mac OS. To owners of the original MS-DOS version, Origin made available a Windows 95 DirectX port, free of charge.

=== Wing Commander: Prophecy ===
Peace has finally come to the Confederation, or so it seems. Still remaining vigilant, they commission the new megacarrier TCS Midway, which is soon needed when Kilrathi worlds are attacked by an enemy whose coming was foretold in ancient Kilrathi prophecies. The insectoid enemy, codenamed the Nephilim, soon begins attacking Confed space and the Midway is called in to stop their advance. As young hotshot pilot Lance Casey, the player must fight their organic ships to help destroy the wormhole they used to enter Kilrathi space, thereby halting the invasion, at least for a while.

As did Wing Commander IV, Prophecy incorporated live-action cutscenes with actors. Prophecy was ported to the Game Boy Advance.

==== Wing Commander: Secret Ops ====
The Nephilim return, this time much closer to Earth. Transferred to the cruiser TCS Cerberus, Casey and his wingmates must repel the invasion once again.

Secret Ops was an experiment in game distribution. It was at first only available as a free download. In regular intervals, new episodes were released, each featuring several new missions with the storyline told through in-game cutscenes. The game was later available in a collection together with Prophecy, and sold as Prophecy Gold.

=== Spin-offs ===
==== Wing Commander Academy ====
A game where the player could build their own missions using ships from Wing Commander II.

==== Wing Commander: Privateer ====
Set in the border regions of Confederation space, the player takes control of a privateer (in Wing Commander, a "privateer" is a mercenary spacer) who may profit by trading, performing various missions, or pirating. Meanwhile, an ancient alien spaceship has been awakened and is on the loose, attacking ships at random, and the player-controlled privateer may be the Confederation's only hope in defeating it.

This game featured completely open-ended gameplay, with the player able to completely ignore the main storyline if they so desired.

===== Righteous Fire =====
When the player's priceless Steltek Gun is stolen, he embarks on a quest that will bring him into conflict with the Luddite-like Church of Man and their shady leader, Mordecai Jones.

==== Wing Commander Armada ====
Armada featured both an action and a strategy game mode and several multiplayer options. The game was ported to the NEC PC9821 and FM Towns.

===== Proving Grounds =====
This add-on for Armada added numerous new features such as a new "arcade"-mode with powerups, radar-obscuring asteroids, and several new multiplayer options, including IPX.

==== The Kilrathi Saga ====
Kilrathi Saga was a limited-edition reissue of the first three Wing Commander games (Wing Commander, Wing Commander II: Vengeance of the Kilrathi, and Wing Commander III: Heart of the Tiger). Origin fixed some of the games' known bugs and adjusted the speed to run on the early Pentium processors of the time. At the time of its release only 20,000 copies were published.

Kilrathi Saga also featured complete digital re-orchestrations of the original two soundtracks by George Oldziey, but the Saga did not include the Secret Missions and Special Operations packs of the first two games. The packs were instead made available for download on the Origin website. Due to the add-on packs not being on the CDs there is a bug that causes some music to not be played during animated sequences in the add-ons.

==== Privateer 2: The Darkening ====
Privateer 2 was launched in late 1996 by Erin Roberts.

The game features live-action video scenes, directed by Steve Hilliker. The cast included Clive Owen, Mathilda May, Jürgen Prochnow, John Hurt, Christopher Walken, Brian Blessed and Amanda Pays. Dani Behr voiced the onboard computer, also named Dani. The game also featured David Warner, and Jürgen Prochnow, who later played Admiral Geoffrey Tolwyn and Commander Paul Gerald, respectively, in the Wing Commander feature film. The filming was done at Pinewood Studios in England.

Set in a remote region of the Wing Commander universe in the Tri-System Confederation (a three system government that has almost three thousand-year history of its own parallel to the Terran Confederation history), a cargo ship Canera is attacked during landing and crashes into Mendra City on planet Crius in the year 2790 of the Tri-System calendar (the calendar appears to be longer than a Terran year with months that are about 40 days each). One survivor, As Ser Lev Arris, a man with no memory of who he is and no record of his existence prior to two weeks before the crash, awakens from his cryo-sleep and must take on the life of a privateer in the Tri-System, re-discovering his past along the way.

==== Wing Commander Arena ====
Publisher Electronic Arts and developer Gaia Industries revived the Wing Commander franchise with a downloadable release on Xbox Live Arcade called Wing Commander Arena. Dogfights take place in one of nine environments, and pilots are able to choose from 18 ships. There can be up to 16 players in a single match. The title was released on July 25, 2007. It is set chronologically after Wing Commander Prophecy Gold, and background information is included in the digital Star*Soldier manual.

=== Canceled games ===
==== Alien Commander ====
Around 1993, Warren Spector developed a pitch for a science fiction game called Alien Commander, which would be set in the Wing Commander universe. A concept document was produced, however the project was scrapped in favor of proceeding with System Shock.

==== Privateer 3 ====
Origin aborted several attempts to continue the Privateer franchise between 1995 and 2003, by either developing a sequel (Privateer 3) or an online game (Privateer or Wing Commander Online). Only one of these was formally announced. The May 1998 issue of Computer Games Strategy Plus featured a cover story on Privateer 3. Origin confirmed that development of the game had been canceled shortly after the magazine was published.

==== Strike Team ====
Wing Commander: Strike Team was a planned sequel to Wing Commander: Secret Ops which focused on multiplayer gameplay. The title was officially announced in an EAUK promotional publication but was canceled early in development.

=== Fan game ===
A fan game, Wing Commander Saga: The Darkest Dawn, was released on March 22, 2012 as freeware for Windows. The game's story runs parallel to the events of Wing Commander III.

== Spiritual successor ==
After Origin Systems was bought out by Electronic Arts, Roberts lost the rights to the Wing Commander franchise. Although there was an attempt to revive it, Roberts said the publisher "doesn't care about that world." This encouraged him to create a spiritual successor to Wing Commander called Star Citizen in 2012. Both Hamill and Rhys-Davies joined the cast of actors working on Squadron 42, a story-based single-player game set in the Star Citizen universe.

== Novels ==
Several novels based on the games have been released by Baen Books. They include novelizations of WCIII and WCIV as well as offering further depth into known Wing Commander events such as the defection of Ralgha nar Hhallas.

== Television series ==
Wing Commander Academy is a 13-episode animated series that originally aired on the USA Network between September 21 and December 21, 1996. The series is set before and during the events of the first game and features many familiar ships and characters. The cast featured Mark Hamill, Tom Wilson, and Malcolm McDowell reprising their Wing Commander game roles.

== Film ==
In 1999, Wing Commander was released in theaters. It was directed by Chris Roberts, the creator of the game series, and stars Freddie Prinze, Jr., Saffron Burrows, Matthew Lillard, Tchéky Karyo, Jürgen Prochnow, and David Warner. The film diverged significantly from the established Wing Commander universe, and was a critical and commercial failure.

== Collectible card game ==
Wing Commander: Collectible Card Game
- Kilrathi card back to the Wing Commander CCG
- Designers: Jeff Grubb and Don Perrin
- Publishers: Mag Force 7
- Players: 2
- Playing time: c. 10 min.
- Chance: Some
- Skills: Card playing arithmetics

The Wing Commander: Collectible card game was an effort to combine the franchise's rising fortunes with the rising interest in card games, as Magic: The Gathering was revolutionizing gaming centers the world over. The collectible card game (CCG) was based exclusively on the WC3 intellectual license and contains no characters found elsewhere.

The game supports two players, one as the Kilrathi Empire and one as the Terran Confederation (rules modifications may be made to allow teams of players instead). In the pre-game phase, players set out five "Nav Point" cards in an X pattern, with a Terran and Kilrathi carrier at either end (to form a hexagon). During gameplay, players may deploy fighters, and then deploy pilots and equipment upon those fighters. Every card has its own "Power Point" cost; players start with 30 Power Points and gain two each turn. The designers recommend pencil and paper for the keeping-track of Power Points. Finally, certain cards feature "Medals", which also feature as a resource, as some elite cards require the "tapping" of Medal-bearing cards to deploy.

Fighters, with pilots and secondary armaments potentially attached, move among the nav points, fighting with each other and attacking the enemy carrier. During combat, either player may play "Maneuver" cards to fortify their fighters (assuming the targeted craft has a high enough Maneuver statistic) or "Battle Damage" cards to cripple their enemies; both have Power Point costs. Attacks are then resolved by comparison of the aggressor's Attack value with the defender's Defense value (with Support values from allied ships augmenting as appropriate). Each card lost results in the loss of one Power Point as well. There are two ways to win: to destroy the enemy carrier (with the successful use of Torpedo cards) or to reduce the opponent's Power Point pool to zero.
