= Wing Commander (video game) =

1990 video game

- Developer: Origin Systems
- Publisher: Origin Systems
- Director: Chris Roberts
- Producers: Chris Roberts; Warren Spector
- Designer: Chris Roberts
- Writer: Jeff George
- Composers: George Alistair Sanger; David Govett
- Series: Wing Commander
- Platform: MS-DOS: Super NES, Amiga, Amiga CD32, Sega CD, 3DO, FM Towns, Macintosh, Windows, PlayStation Portable
- Release: September 26, 1990: MS-DOS September 26, 1990 Super NES; NA: March 1, 1992; PAL: 1993 Amiga September 1992 CD32 June 1, 1993 Sega CD; NA: March 1994 Macintosh August 1995 Windows November 30, 1996
- Genre: Space flight simulation
- Mode: Single-player

Wing Commander is the first game in Chris Roberts' space flight simulation Wing Commander franchise by Origin Systems. The game was first released for MS-DOS on September 26, 1990, and was later ported to the Amiga, CD32 (256-color), Sega CD and the Super Nintendo Entertainment System, and re-released for the PC as Wing Commander I in 1994. An enhanced remake Super Wing Commander was made for the 3DO in 1994, and later ported to the Macintosh.

Two expansion packs for the game were released: Wing Commander: The Secret Missions in November 1990 and Wing Commander: The Secret Missions 2: Crusade in March 1991.

The game was considered a major step forward for space dogfight games, featuring graphics, audio, and a story campaign that invited comparison to the Star Wars films. Set in the year 2654 and characterized by Chris Roberts as "World War II in space", it features a multinational cast of pilots from the "Terran Confederation" flying missions against the predatory, aggressive Kilrathi, a feline warrior race (heavily inspired by the Kzinti of Larry Niven's Known Space universe).

== Gameplay ==
Screenshot showing the cockpit of the player's ship and a targeted enemy in an outer space setting

Wing Commander is a space flight simulation game, with the player piloting a ship, completing missions, and engaging enemy ships of various capabilities. As the title suggests, there will generally be an AI-controlled wingman which the player can give orders to. Missions will generally include multiple objectives, but the game can proceed even if objectives are failed as long as the protagonist survives. The game features a branching, open-ended story where overall performance affects the campaign: succeeding at objectives results in medals, promotions in rank, and progressing to missions with better ships; failing at objectives leads to more difficult missions and piloting inferior ships. The mission tree is designed so players on the "losing" path could work their way back to the "winning" path, and conversely players on the "winning" path could fail subsequent missions to fall into the "losing" path. In addition, the wingmen can be killed permanently in combat, including by the player, and thus be gone for the rest of the campaign.

The two Secret Missions expansion packs do not have a branching, open-ended story, and the player must successfully complete the core missions to win the game.

== Plot ==
=== Wing Commander ===
The player takes the role of a nameless pilot (later referred to as Christopher Blair in sequels) aboard the TCS Tiger's Claw, a Bengal-class Strike Carrier. The player names the pilot and chooses his call sign. The pilot, known in-production to Origin personnel as "Bluehair" after his most notable feature, quickly rises through the ranks of the flight wing. The campaign will split to various different planets and scenarios depending on the player's performance. If the player performs overall well, they eventually lead a strike on the Kilrathi High Command starbase in the Venice system and force the Kilrathi to retreat. If the player fails too many objectives, missions become increasingly defensive in nature. Human refugees abandon the sector, and eventually the Claw is forced to retreat as well. Of the two endings, the "winning" path is considered canon by the game's two expansion packs as well as its many sequels.

=== Wing Commander: The Secret Missions ===
In the add-on's plot, the Tiger's Claw, on maneuvers in the Goddard System, receives an abortive distress call from Goddard colony. When the Claw arrives, though, nothing is left but wreckage and corpses; a quarter of a million colonists have been killed. Confed realizes that this is the work of a new Kilrathi weapon, the "Graviton weapon", which is able to increase the power of gravity by over a hundred times. Clever work by the Claw's crew and pilots allows them to capture a Kilrathi courier ship, which reveals that this weapon is mounted on an entirely new class of ship; CNC codenames it the Sivar-class dreadnought, after the Kilrathi god of war. Bluehair leads the strike against the Sivar and destroys it in the Vigrid system; for unexplained reasons, ships of that class and armament are never seen again.

=== Wing Commander: The Secret Missions 2: Crusade ===
In the add-on's plot, the Tiger's Claw is in the Firekka System, whose native intelligent lifeforms – the bird-like Firekkans – are negotiating to join the Terran Confederation. Tensions are high, and will only get higher. There is an unusual Kilrathi presence in the area, including their upgraded Dralthi II and ships that have never been seen before: the Hhriss-class heavy fighter and the Snakeir-class heavy carrier. This presence develops into a massive battle group, and though the Firekkans sign the Articles of the Confederation, the outnumbered Terrans have no choice but to retreat. Adding to the mess, a Kilrathi lord, Ralgha nar Hhallas, defects, bringing his Fralthi-class cruiser, the Ras Nik'hra, and word of a rebellion against the Empire on the Kilrathi colony of Ghorah Khar.

Finally, almost overlooked in all the chaos, Major Kien "Bossman" Chen is lost while flying on Jeannette Devereaux's wing; the nearby TCS Austin transfers over two pilots, Lieutenants Zachary "Jazz" Colson and Etienne "Doomsday" Montclair. All this happens in the first six missions of the game. The Kilrathi presence in the Firekka sector is eventually explained by an all-channels transmission from the Crown Prince of the Kilrathi Empire, Thrakhath nar Kiranka: Firekka has been chosen as the site of this year's Rite of Sivar, a religious festival that involves live sacrifices. Seeing the chance to strike a heady blow to Kilrathi morale, the Confederation assigns its Firekka-sector resources the task of disrupting the ceremony.

The Dralthi medium fighters from the Ras Nik'hra are put to work on reconnaissance missions (conveniently, the Confederation Scimitar medium fighter is retired at the beginning of the expansion pack, opening a space in the database of Confederation fighters for the Dralthi), and Terran troops begin landing in secret. Between these, the Firekkans' warrior spirit and some of the Confederation's best pilots and tacticians, the Sivar ceremony is utterly wrecked and the Kilrathi forced to retreat, though they take a number of important Firekkans with them as hostages. At the end of Crusade, Jeannette Devereaux is detailed off to the TCS Austin, where she will serve as Wing Commander.

Interested in the other half of the crusade, Mercedes Lackey and Ellen Guon penned the first Wing Commander novel, Wing Commander: Freedom Flight. It tells the Firekkan side of the story, from several points of view: Ralgha nar Hhallas, Ian "Hunter" St. John, James "Paladin" Taggart, and K'kai, a Firekkan flock leader.

=== Super Wing Commander ===
Super Wing Commander was a drastic new look at the events of the original Wing Commander. That mission led the Tiger's Claw to track down and destroy the shipyards responsible for creating the Sivar Dreadnought. Additional background elements about stealth fighters and Admiral Tolwyn were added to improve the continuity with Wing Commander II.

Next Generation reviewed the 3DO version of the game, rating it four stars out of five, and stated that "Super Wing Commander succeeds at being what it was intended to be - a straightforward space simulator with an arcade spin".

== History ==
=== Development ===
Wing Commander was originally titled Squadron and later renamed Wingleader. During development for Wing Commander, the EMM386 memory manager the game used would give an exception when the user exited the game. It would print out a message similar to "EMM386 Memory manager error..." with additional information. Before the team could isolate and fix the error and they considered a work-around, one of the game's programmers, Ken Demarest, hex-edited the memory manager so it displayed a different message. Instead of the error message, it printed "Thank you for playing Wing Commander". This workaround was removed before shipping the game, once the problem was fixed.

=== Release ===
Wing Commander shipped in 1990 for PC/DOS as the initial platform and came with an instruction booklet styled as a shipboard magazine, Claw Marks. It provided tactical suggestions, statistics on fighters and weapons both Kilrathi and Terran, capsule biographies of notable pilots on both sides of the line, and general shipboard news (such as the discontinuation of the popular comic strip Hornet's Nest, due to the recent death of its artist, Lt. Larry "Tooner" Dibbles). Notable contributors to the Claw Marks magazine include Captain Aaron Allston, Major Warren Spector, and Col. Chris Roberts. The game also shipped with a set of blueprints for the game's four playable fighters, the Hornet, Scimitar, Rapier, and Raptor.

==== Mission packs ====
In November 1990, an add-on campaign, named Wing Commander: The Secret Missions, was released, adding new missions, new ships, a new storyline, and an increase in difficulty. Unlike the original game, The Secret Missions does not feature a branching mission tree; every player plays the same missions in the same order. However, if the player does not fulfill the mission requirements at any system, he immediately plays the two losing "retreat" missions that are not on the winning path. The Secret Missions was also released for the Super NES as a stand-alone cartridge.

The second expansion pack for Wing Commander, Wing Commander: The Secret Missions 2: Crusade adds a new narrative, new ships, more difficult missions, and two new wingmen. It was released in March 1991.

==== Ports and re-release ====
Wing Commander was ported to the Super NES and Amiga in 1992, to the Amiga CD32 in 1993, and to the Sega CD system in 1994. A Sega Mega Drive version intended to use a custom ASIC graphics chip on the cartridge was planned but never released.

In 1994, Wing Commander was retroactively renamed Wing Commander I in a bundled re-release together with Wing Commander II, in preparation for the release of Wing Commander III: Heart of the Tiger. The rebundled remakes do not contain and do not support the Secret Missions addons.

In 1996 Wing Commander was ported to Windows 95 in a bundled re-release together with Wing Commander II, and Wing Commander III: Heart of the Tiger known as Wing Commander: The Kilrathi Saga. All three games were ported to Windows 95 and the Secret Missions Addons whilst not shipped on the CDs could be downloaded from Origin's website.

==== Super Wing Commander ====
Screenshot showing vastly improved graphics

Super Wing Commander; released on March 23, 1994, for 3DO and Macintosh; was a drastic new look at the events of the original Wing Commander game with enhanced graphics and full speech. The game also contained both Secret Missions and a special third campaign was also created between them (called "Secret Mission 1.5" by fans).

=== Legacy ===
Chris Crawford said of Wing Commander that it "raised the bar for the whole industry", as the game was five times more expensive to create than most of its contemporaries. Because the game was highly successful, other publishers had to match its production value in order to compete. This forced a large portion of the video game industry to become more conservative, as larger budgets required greater sales to be profitable and the possibility of large losses dictated a decrease in the chance of that outcome, an aspect of classic risk-and-return dynamics. Crawford opined that Wing Commander in particular affected the marketing and economics of computer games and reestablished the "action game" as the most lucrative type of computer game.

In 2006 Electronic Arts ported the Super NES version of Wing Commander to the PlayStation Portable as part of EA Replay, released in the United States on November 14. In August 2011, after many years of unavailability, the Wing Commander PC version was re-released into the digital distribution on gog.com. The long lost source code of Wing Commander was given to the fan-community in that year in August by a former developer for the purpose of long-time preservation.

== Reception ==
Reception

Review scores
Publication	Score
Computer Gaming World	4.5/5
Dragon	6/5
Electronic Gaming Monthly	8/10, 8/10, 7/10, 8/10 (3DO)
3DO Magazine	4/5 (3DO)

Awards
Publication	Award
Computer Gaming World	1991 Game of the Year
Computer Gaming World	Hall of Fame
Computer Gaming World	#7 Best PC Game of All Time
Computer Gaming World	15 Best Ways to Die
Time	100 Best Video Games of All Time
PC Format	50 Best Computer Games of All Time
PC Gamer US	#23 Best Game of All Time

Wing Commander became a best seller and resulted in the development of competing space combat games, such as LucasArts' X-Wing. It was very well received by critics. Dragon gave Wing Commander six stars, out of a five-star system, the Secret Missions Expansion Disk receiving five stars. Computer Gaming World in 1990 described the game as a "stellar warfare adventure in every sense of the word", praising its graphics, story, and music. The magazine described The Secret Missions expansion as "more of the same", albeit more difficult, but the second as improving computer pilots' intelligence. In a 1992 survey of science fiction games, the magazine gave the title five of five stars, stating that "the richness of the entire package makes this a 'must-have'". A 1994 survey of strategic space games set in the year 2000 and later gave the game four-plus stars out of five. Its readers gave Wing Commander a score of 10.91, the highest rating in the history of the magazine until 1992, when it was superseded by the sequel Wing Commander II; that year the magazine added Wing Commander to its Hall of Fame for games that readers highly rated over time.

GamePro gave the Sega CD version a positive review, commenting that "a great story line with cinematic animation and digitized speech gives this game the feel of a big screen space opera". They regarded the Super Wing Commander remake for the 3DO to be "a tedious disappointment", citing missions that are "either too short or too repetitive", dramatic slowdown which interferes with the gameplay, poorly animated character faces, and low quality voice tracks.

Jim Trunzo reviewed Wing Commander in White Wolf #26 (April/May, 1991), rating it a 5 out of 5 and stated that "Wing Commander brings back all the excitement and danger of the space combat scenes of the Star Wars trilogy (from which it appears to have borrowed liberally). It succeeds on every conceivable level and this review has only skimmed the surface of the features included in the program."

In 1991, Wing Commander won Computer Gaming World's Overall Game of the Year award. In 1996 the magazine ranked it as the seventh best PC video game of all time, also listing the game's Game Over funeral cutscene among the 15 best ways to die in computer gaming. In 2011, Maximum PC included it on the list 16 classic games that need to be remade today, stating: "Chris Roberts and Origin really nailed the space opera with this series, which blended fast action and a fairly engaging (if hokey) story. Way ahead of its time". In 2012, Time named Wing Commander one of the 100 greatest video games of all time, remembering its "unprecedented detail" of graphics and calling it "a revelation in 1990 for PC space-sim buffs looking for a little less Star Trek and a little more Star Wars from the genre".

In 1991, PC Format placed Wing Commander on its list of the 50 best computer games of all time. The editors praised its "superb graphics, atmospheric storyline and [the] sheer hectic pace of the dogfighting". In 1994, PC Gamer US named the game's CD-ROM release the 23rd best computer game ever. The editors wrote: "If Wing Commander were just a dog-fighting arcade game, it would still be great. But it's a lot more than that, as it combines animated sequences, voice acting, and a great story to create the first example of that now-overused phrase, 'Interactive Cinema'". In 1995, Flux magazine rated the pc version 20th on its "Top 100 Video Games." In 1996, GamesMaster ranked the 3DO version 5th on their "The Gamesmaster 3DO Top 10."

In 1991 it won the Origins Award for Best Fantasy or Science Fiction Computer Game of 1990.

By February 1995, Wing Commander had sold 290,000 copies.
