= Index of DOS games (W) =

This is an index of DOS games.

This list has been split into multiple pages. Please use the Table of Contents to browse it.

Title	Released	Developer(s)	Publisher(s)
Wacky Wheels	1994	Beavis Soft	Apogee Software
Walls of Rome	1993	Mindcraft	Mindcraft
Wanderer	1988	S. Shipway	
Warcraft: Orcs & Humans	1994	Blizzard Entertainment	Blizzard Entertainment/Interplay Entertainment
Warcraft II: Beyond the Dark Portal	1996	Cyberlore Studios	Blizzard Entertainment
Warcraft II: Tides of Darkness	1995	Blizzard Entertainment	Blizzard Entertainment/Ubisoft
Wargame Construction Set	1986	Roger Damon	Strategic Simulations
Wargame Construction Set III: Age of Rifles 1846–1905	1996	Strategic Simulations	Strategic Simulations
War Inc.	1997	Optik Software	Interactive Magic
War in the Gulf	1993	Oxford Digital Enterprises Ltd.	Empire Software
Warlords	1990	Steven Fawkner	Strategic Studies Group
Warlords II	1993	Steven Fawkner	Strategic Studies Group
Warlords II Scenario Builder	1994	Strategic Studies Group	Strategic Studies Group
War of the Lance	1990	Strategic Simulations	Strategic Simulations
Warp Factor, The	1982	Strategic Simulations	Strategic Simulations
Warrior of Ras: Volume I - Dunzhin	1982	Intelligent Statements Inc.	Computer Applications Unlimited
Warship	1988	Strategic Simulations	Strategic Simulations
Wasteland	1988	Interplay	Electronic Arts
Waterloo	1989	Personal Software Services	Mirrorsoft
Waterworld	1995	Ocean Software	Ocean Software
Waxworks	1992	Horrorsoft	Accolade
Wayne Gretzky Hockey	1988	Bethesda Softworks	Bethesda Softworks
Wayne's World	1993	Capstone	Capstone
Weird Dreams	1989	Rainbird Software	Rainbird Software
Welltris	1989	Spectrum Holobyte	Spectrum Holobyte
Werewolf vs. Comanche 2.0	1995	NovaLogic, Inc	Softgold Computerspiele GmbH
Western Front: The Liberation of Europe 1944-1945	1991		
Wetlands	1995	Hypnotix	New World Computing
Whale's Voyage	1993	Neo Software	Flair Software
Wheel of Fortune	1988	Softie	ShareData
When Two Worlds War	1993	Impressions Games	Impressions Games
Where in America's Past is Carmen Sandiego?	1991	Broderbund	Broderbund
Where in Europe is Carmen Sandiego?	1988	Broderbund	Broderbund
Where in Space is Carmen Sandiego?	1993	Broderbund	Broderbund
Where in the U.S.A. Is Carmen Sandiego?	1986	Broderbund	Broderbund
Where in the U.S.A. is Carmen Sandiego? (Enhanced)	1992	Broderbund	Broderbund
Where in the World Is Carmen Sandiego?	1985	Broderbund	Broderbund
Where in the World is Carmen Sandiego? Deluxe Edition	1990	Broderbund	Broderbund
Where in the World is Carmen Sandiego? (Enhanced)	1996	Broderbund	Broderbund
Where in Time Is Carmen Sandiego?	1989	Broderbund	Broderbund
Where Time Stood Still	1988	Denton Designs	Ocean Software
Whizz	1994	Flair Software	Flair Software
Who Framed Roger Rabbit	1988	Buena Vista Software	Buena Vista Software
Who Shot Johnny Rock?	1991	American Laser Games	American Laser Games
WiBArm	1989	Arsys Software	Broderbund
Wilderness: A Survival Adventure	1986	Titan Computer Products	Electric Transit, Inc.
Will Harvey's Zany Golf	1988	Sandcastle Productions	Electronic Arts
Williams Arcade Classics	1995	Digital Eclipse Software	Williams Entertainment Inc.
William Shatner's TekWar	1995	Capstone Software	Capstone Software
Willow	1988	MidNite Entertainment Group, Brian A. Rice	Mindscape
Wing Commander	1990	Origin Systems	Origin Systems
Wing Commander: The Secret Missions	1990	Origin Systems	Origin Systems
Wing Commander: The Secret Missions 2: Crusade	1991	Origin Systems	Origin Systems
Wing Commander II: Vengeance of the Kilrathi	1991	Origin Systems	Origin Systems
Wing Commander: Academy	1993	Origin Systems	Origin Systems
Wing Commander: Armada	1994	Origin Systems	Electronic Arts
Wing Commander: Privateer	1993	Origin Systems	Origin Systems
Wing Commander: Privateer Speech Pack	1993	Origin Systems	Origin Systems
Wing Commander III: Heart of the Tiger	1994	Origin Systems	Origin Systems
Wing Commander IV: The Price of Freedom	1995	Origin Systems	Electronic Arts
Wings of Fury	1987	Distinctive Software	Broderbund
Wings of Glory	1994	Origin Systems	Electronic Arts
Win, Lose or Draw	1988	Buena Vista	Buena Vista
Winnie the Pooh in the Hundred Acre Wood	1986	Sierra On-Line	Sierra On-Line
Winter Challenge	1991	MindSpan	Accolade
Winter Games	1986	Epyx	Epyx
Winter Olympics: Lillehammer 94	1993	ID Software	U.S. Gold
Wipeout	1995	Psygnosis	Psygnosis
Wishbringer	1985	Infocom	Infocom
Witchaven	1995	Capstone Software	Intracorp Entertainment
Witchaven II: Blood Vengeance	1996	Capstone Software	Intracorp Entertainment
Witness, The	1983	Infocom	Infocom
Wizard and the Princess	1982	On-Line Systems	On-Line Systems
Wizard of Oz, The	1985	Windham Classics	Windham Classics
Wizard Wars	1988	Out of the Blue	Paragon Software
Wizard Warz	1987	Canvas Software	GO! Media Holdings
Wizardry: Proving Grounds of the Mad Overlord	1984	Sir-Tech	Sir-Tech
Wizardry II: The Knight of Diamonds	1985	Sir-Tech	Sir-Tech
Wizardry III: Legacy of Llylgamyn	1986	Sir-Tech	Sir-Tech
Wizardry IV: The Return of Werdna	1987	Sir-Tech	Sir-Tech
Wizardry V: Heart of the Maelstrom	1988	Sir-Tech	Sir-Tech
Wizardry VI: Bane of the Cosmic Forge	1990	Sir-Tech	Sir-Tech
Wizardry VII: Crusaders of the Dark Savant	1992	Sir-Tech	Sir-Tech
Wizard's Crown	1986	Strategic Simulations	Strategic Simulations
Wizball	1987	Sensible Software	Ocean Software
Wizkid: The Story Of Wizball II	1992	Sensible Software	Ocean Software
Wolf	1994	Manley and Associates	Sanctuary Woods
Wolfenstein 3D	1992	id Software	Apogee Software
WolfPack	1990	NovaLogic	Broderbund
Wonderland	1990	Magnetic Scrolls	Virgin Mastertronic
Word Rescue	1992	Redwood Games	Apogee Software
Wordtris	1991	Realtime Associates	Spectrum HoloByte
Word Whiz	1988	Apogee Software	Apogee Software
World Championship Boxing Manager	1990	Goliath Games	Goliath Games
World Championship Soccer	1991	Elite Systems	Elite Systems
World Circuit	1992	Microprose	Microprose
World Class Leader Board	1987	Access Software	Access Software
World Cup USA '94	1994	U.S. Gold	U.S. Gold
World Empire	1991	Viable Software Alternatives	Viable Software Alternatives
World Games	1986	K-Byte	Epyx
World Hockey '95	1995	Merit Studios	Softkey
World of Aden: Thunderscape	1995	Strategic Simulations	Strategic Simulations
World Karate Championship	1986	Epyx	System 3
Worlds of Ultima: The Savage Empire	1990	Origin Systems	Origin Systems
World Tour Golf	1986	Electronic Arts	Electronic Arts
World War II GI	1999	TNT Team	GT Interactive
Worlds of Legend: Son of the Empire	1993	Mindscape	Mindscape
Worms	1995	Team17	Ocean Software
Worms: Reinforcements	1995	Team17	Ocean Software
Wrath of the Demon	1991	ReadySoft	ReadySoft
Writer Rabbit	1986	The Learning Company	The Learning Company
WWF European Rampage Tour	1992	Arc Developers	Ocean Software
WWF In Your House	1996	Sculptured Software	Acclaim Entertainment
WWF WrestleMania	1991	Twilight	Ocean Software
WWF WrestleMania: The Arcade Game	1995	Sculptured Software	Acclaim Entertainment
