= Mitsubishi Fuso Aero Bus =

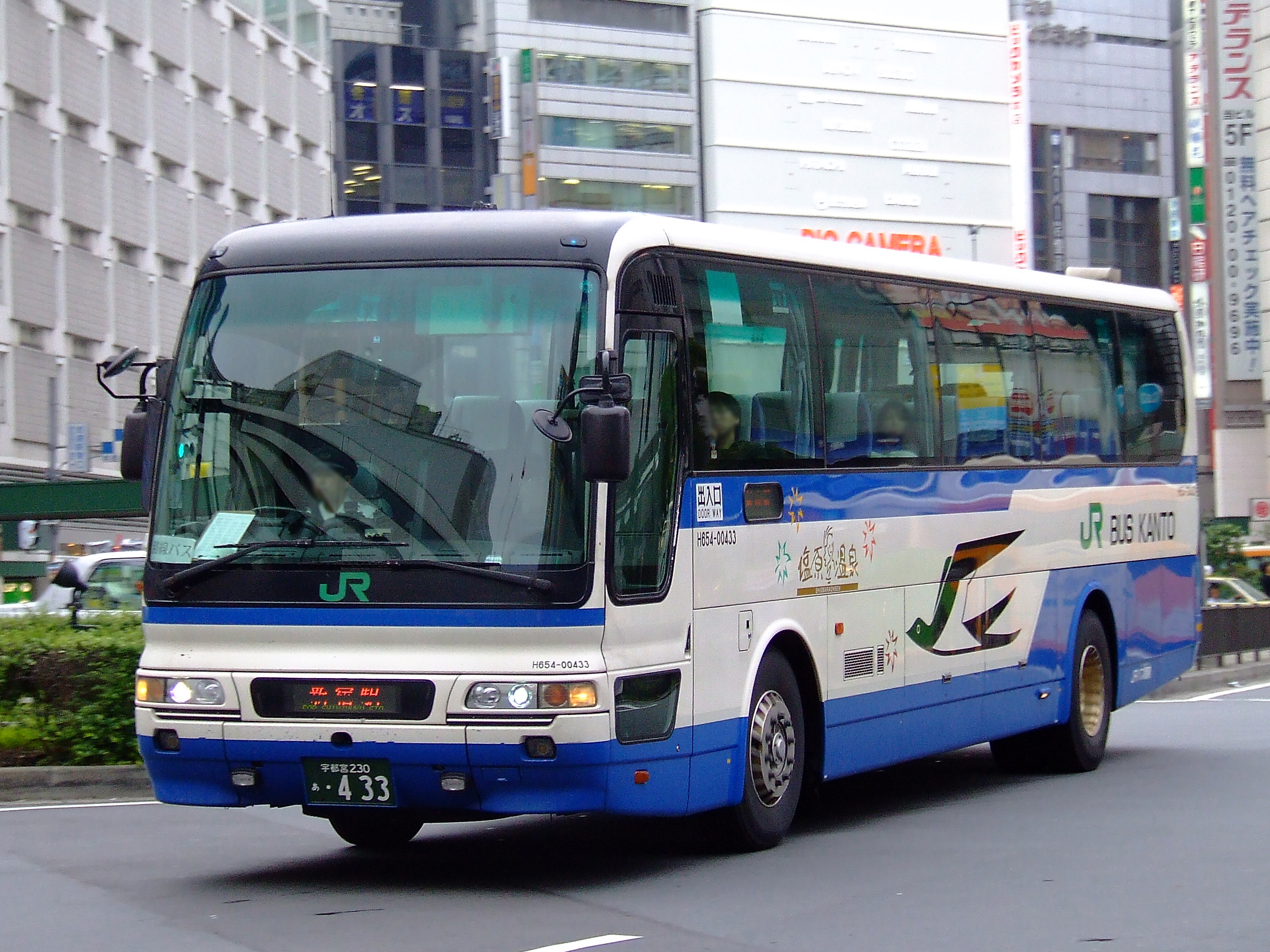
- JR Bus Kanto H654-00433 (Up) and Miagi Kotsu (Down)

Overview
- Manufacturer: Mitsubishi Motors Corporation (1982–2002); Mitsubishi Fuso Truck and Bus Corporation (2003–present); Hyundai Motor Company; Temsa (1988–2008)
- Also called: Hyundai Aero (for Korean domestic market); Mitsubishi Maraton-Prenses-Safir (for Turkish domestic market)
- Production: 1982–present

Body and chassis
- Class: Complete bus Bus chassis
- Body style: Single-decker coach

Powertrain
- Engine: 8DC8, 8DC9, 8DC10, 8DC11, 8M20, 6M70, 6R10
- Transmission: 6-speed manual INOMAT 6-speed automatic

Dimensions
- Wheelbase: 6500 mm (MS7), 6150 mm (MS8), 6000 mm (PJ-MS86 and MS9)
- Length: 12000 mm
- Width: 2500 mm

Chronology
- Predecessor: Mitsubishi Fuso MS Series; Mitsubishi Fuso MM Series

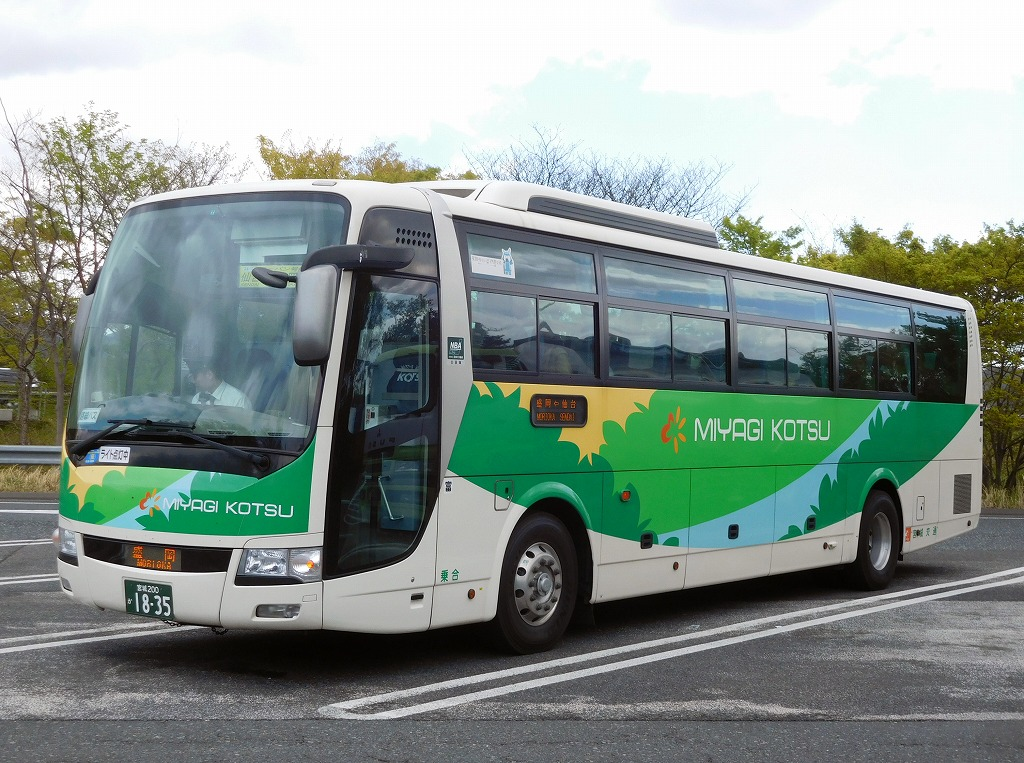

The Mitsubishi Fuso Aero Bus (kana:三菱ふそう・エアロバス) is a series of heavy-duty intercity coaches produced by the Japanese manufacturer Mitsubishi Fuso. The range was primarily unavailable with left-hand drive. However, Turkish bus maker Temsa used produce a left hand drive variant models, called Mitsubishi Maraton and Prenses (facelift) and later Safir (next generation Aero Queen), while Hyundai Motor Company produced another left hand drive variant called the Hyundai Aero. Its principal Japanese competitors are Isuzu Gala, Nissan Diesel Space Arrow and Hino S'elega.

== Fuso tourist buses (predecessors of Aero Bus) ==
- MAR820 (1962)
- B806､B905/906/907 (1967)
- MS512/513 (1976, 1977)
- K-MS613/615 (1980)
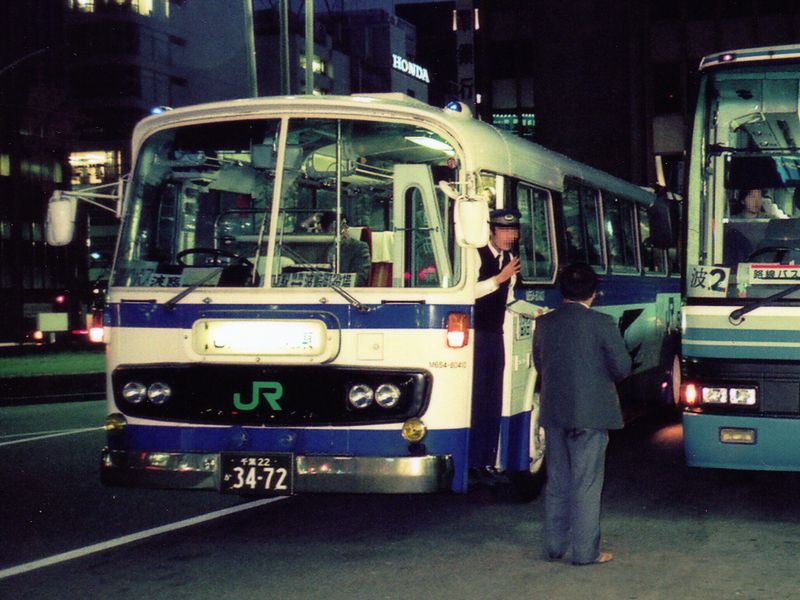
MS K-MS504R

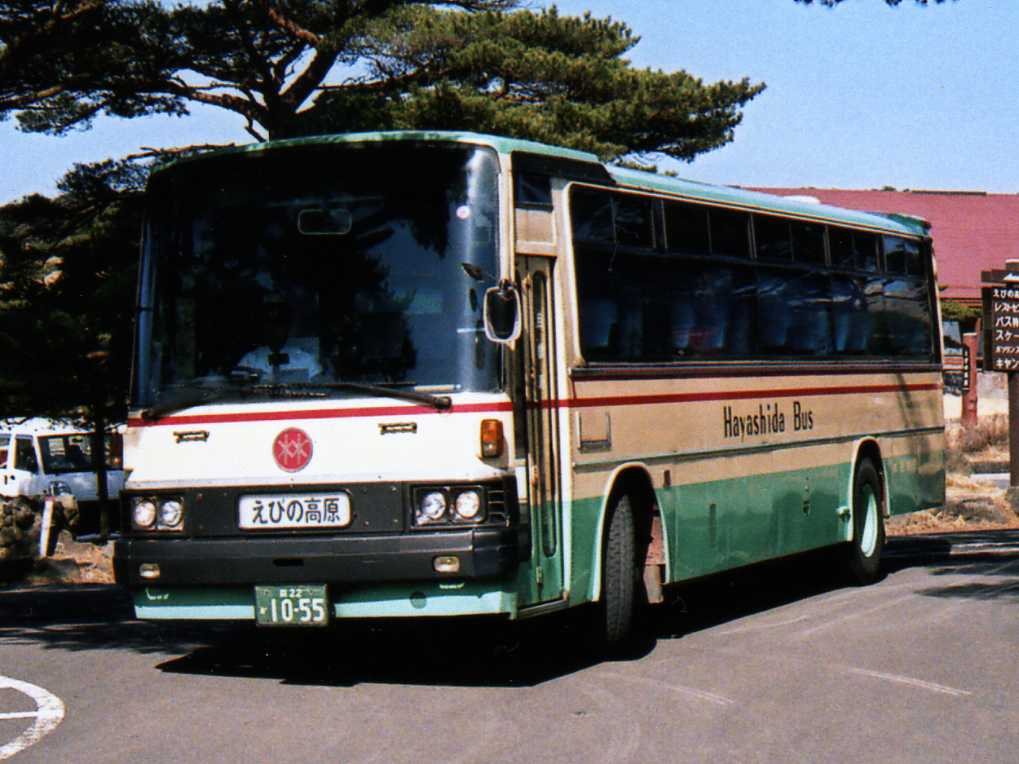
MS K-MS615S

== Aero Bus/Aero Queen ==
=== Aero Bus/Super Aero (MS) ===
- P-MS713/715/725 (1982)
- U-MS716/726/729 (1984)

=== Aero Queen W (MU) ===
Chassies based on the Aero King double-decker, 8DC9T engine equipped ("T"=turbocharged, maximum output: 380PS).

- P-MU525TA (1985)
- U-MU525TA (1990)

=== Aero Queen M/MV (MS) ===
8DC11 Engine equipped.

- P-MS729S (1988)
- U-MS729S (1990)
- P-MS725(1986)
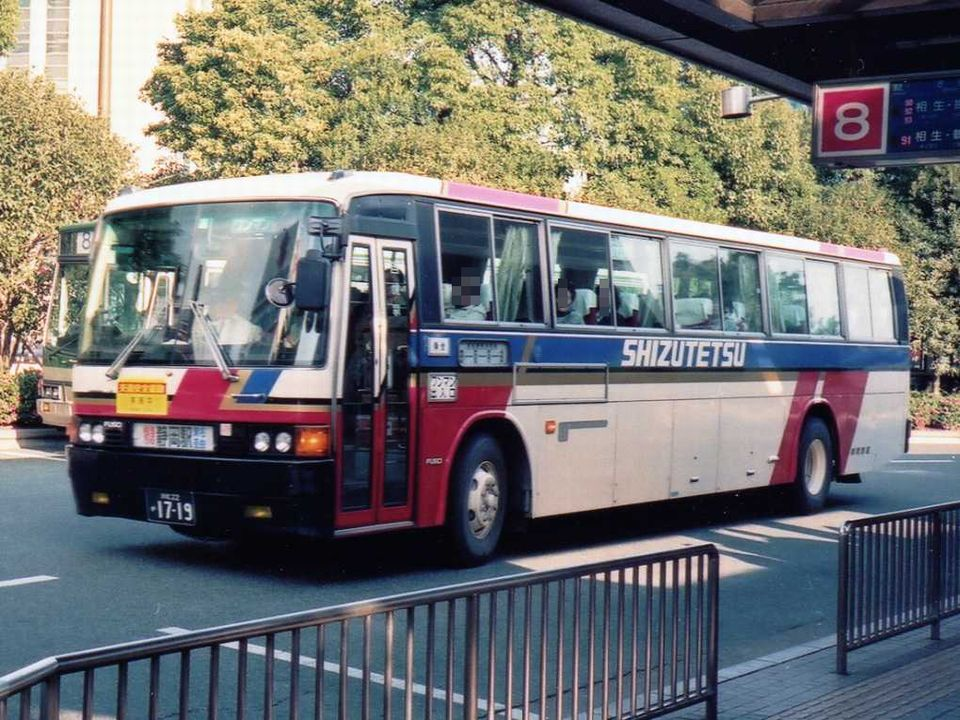
Aero Bus P-MS715N

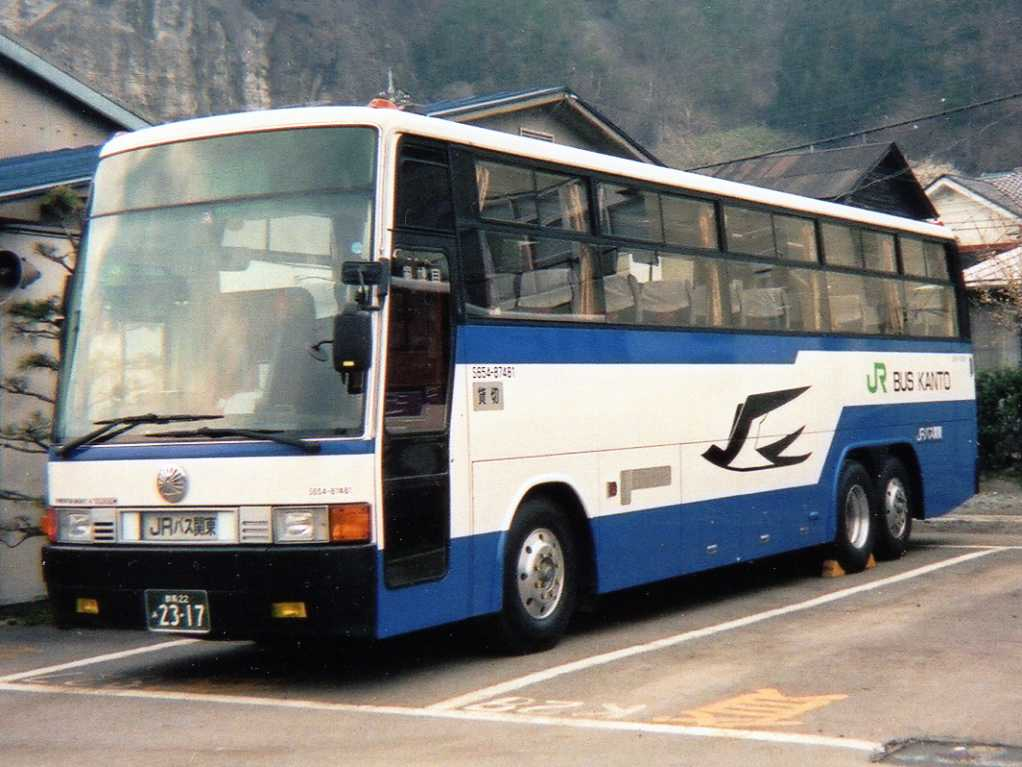
Aero Queen W P-MS525TAkai

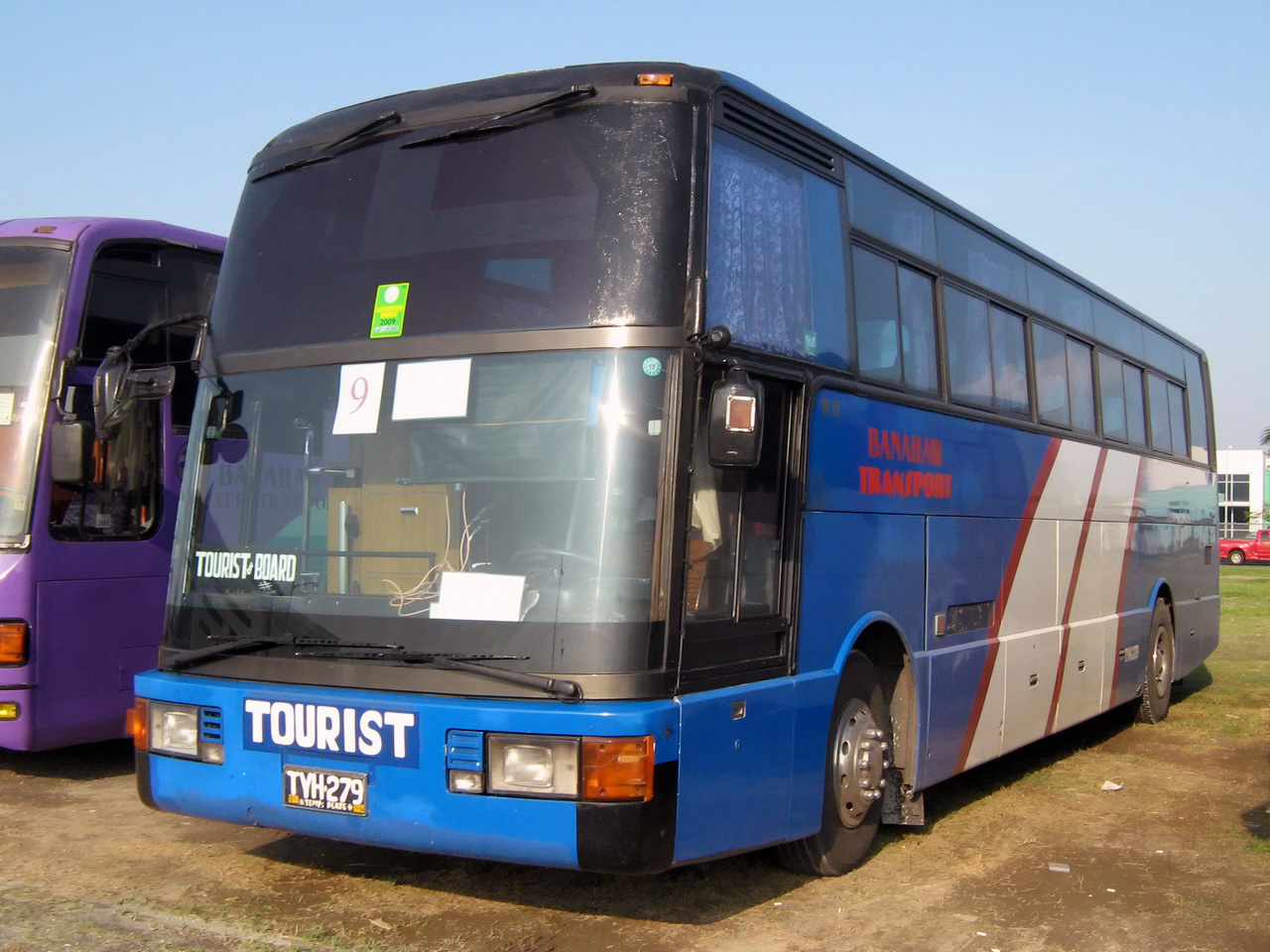
Aero Queen K P-MS729SA

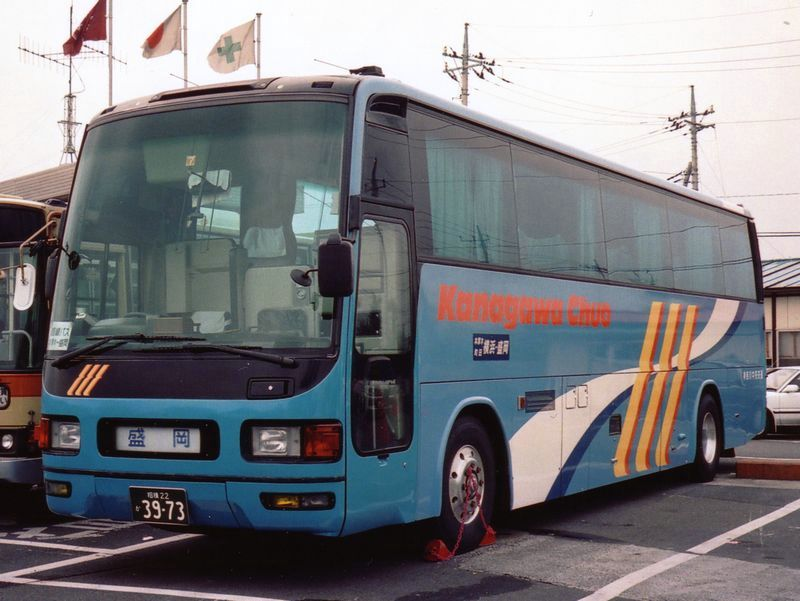
Aero Queen M P-MS729SA

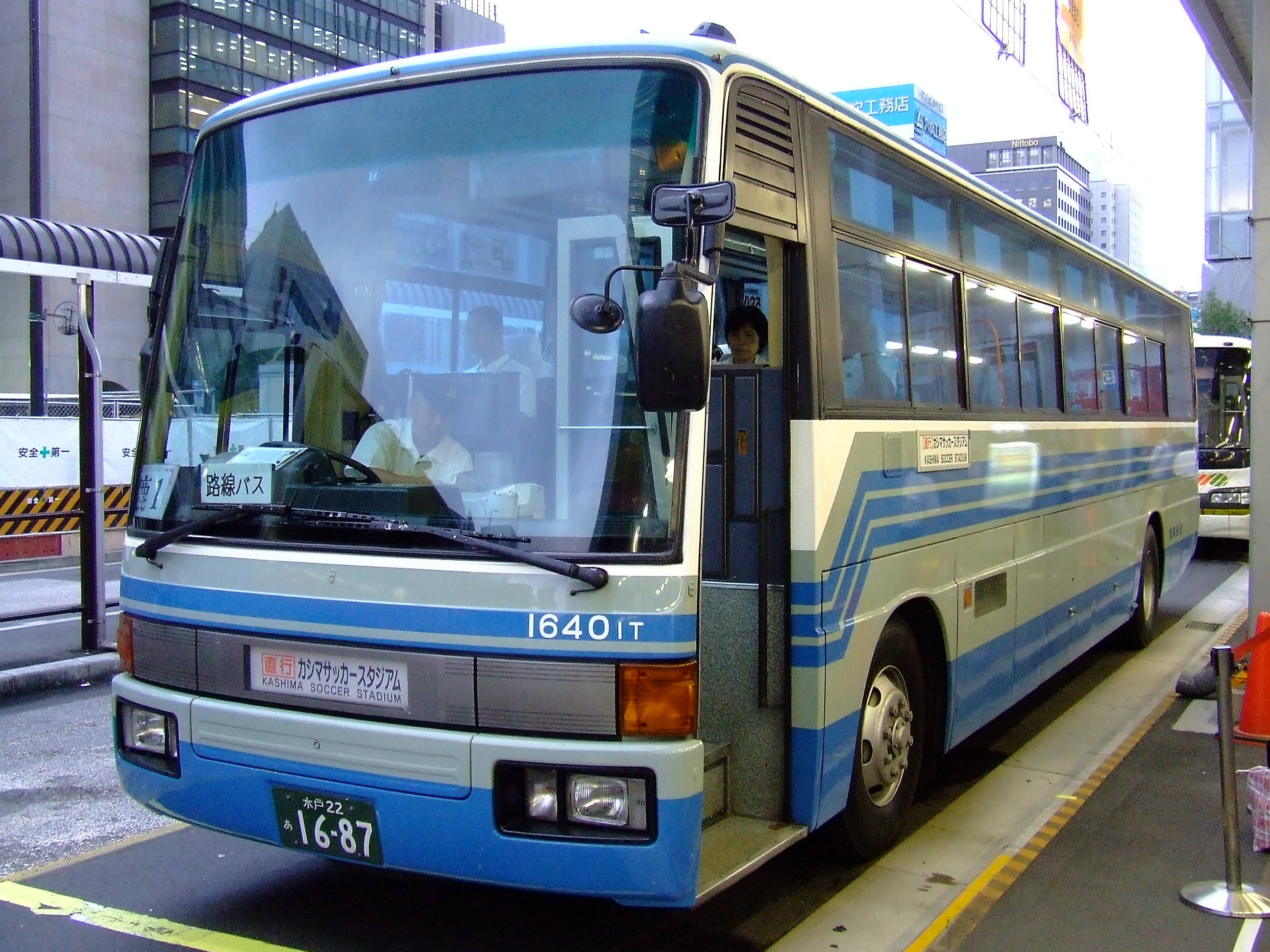
Aero Bus K U-MS726N

== New Aero Bus/New Aero Queen ==
- U-MS821/826/815 (1992)
  - 8M20 Engine equipped, and wheelbase reduced to 6.15 meter.
  - Jake brake equipped (named "Powertard", except low-end model) (Turkish variant models Prenses and Safir feature an electrical resistive retarder instead)
- KC-MS822/829/815 (1995)
  - 8M21 Engine equipped.
  - Front bumper design changed (Aero Bus and Queen-I).
- KL-MS86/85 (2000)
  - All model equipped wedge air-brake and driver's airbag.
  - HID headlight equipped.
- PJ-MS86 (2005)
  - Engine changed to 6M70 (turbocharged), and wheelbase reduced to 6.0 meter.
  - Queen-III deleted from line-up.
  - Tail light design changed (minor).
  - Added extra brake light
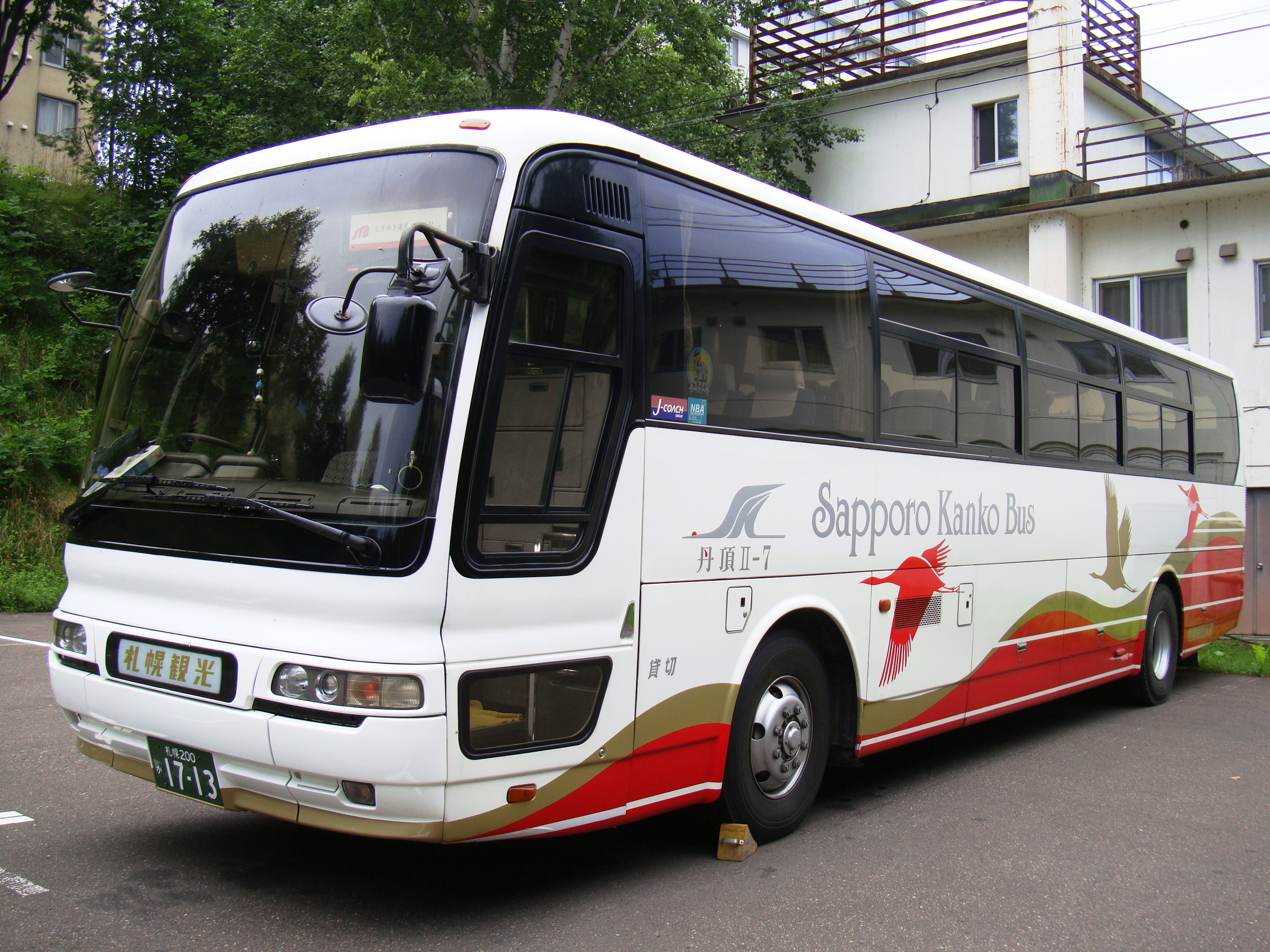
Aero Bus U-MS826P

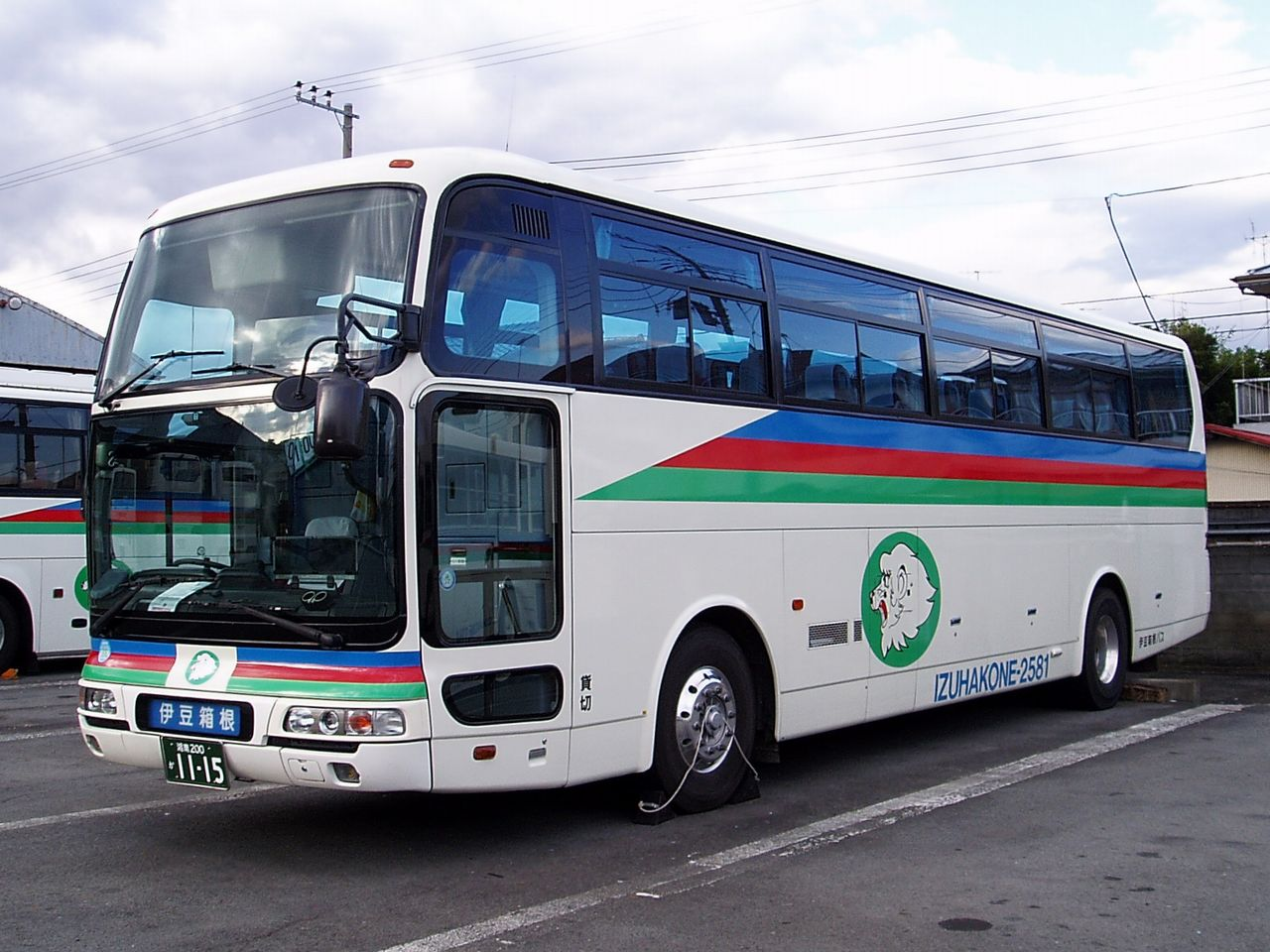
Aero Queen II KC-MS822P

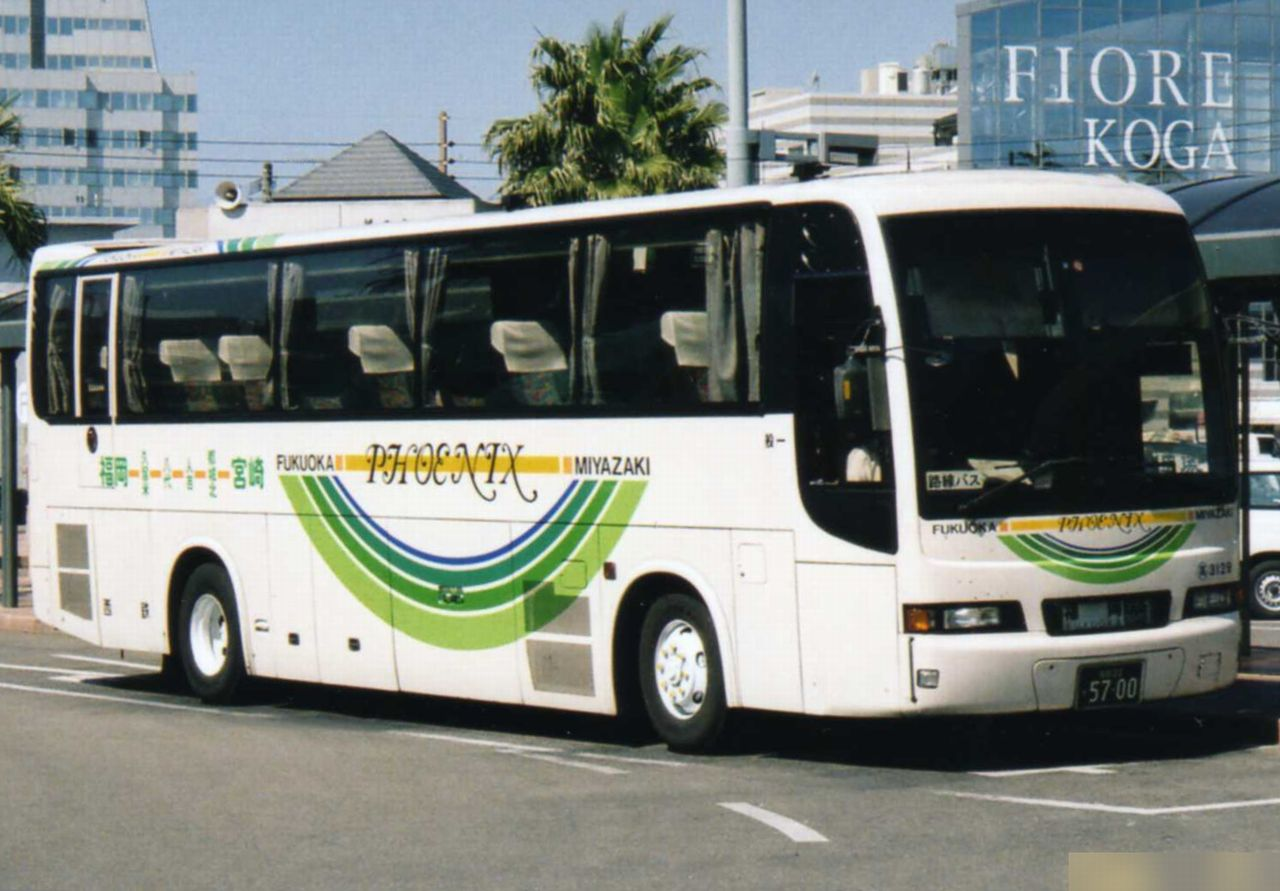
Aero Bus (NSK 92MC body) KC-MS829P

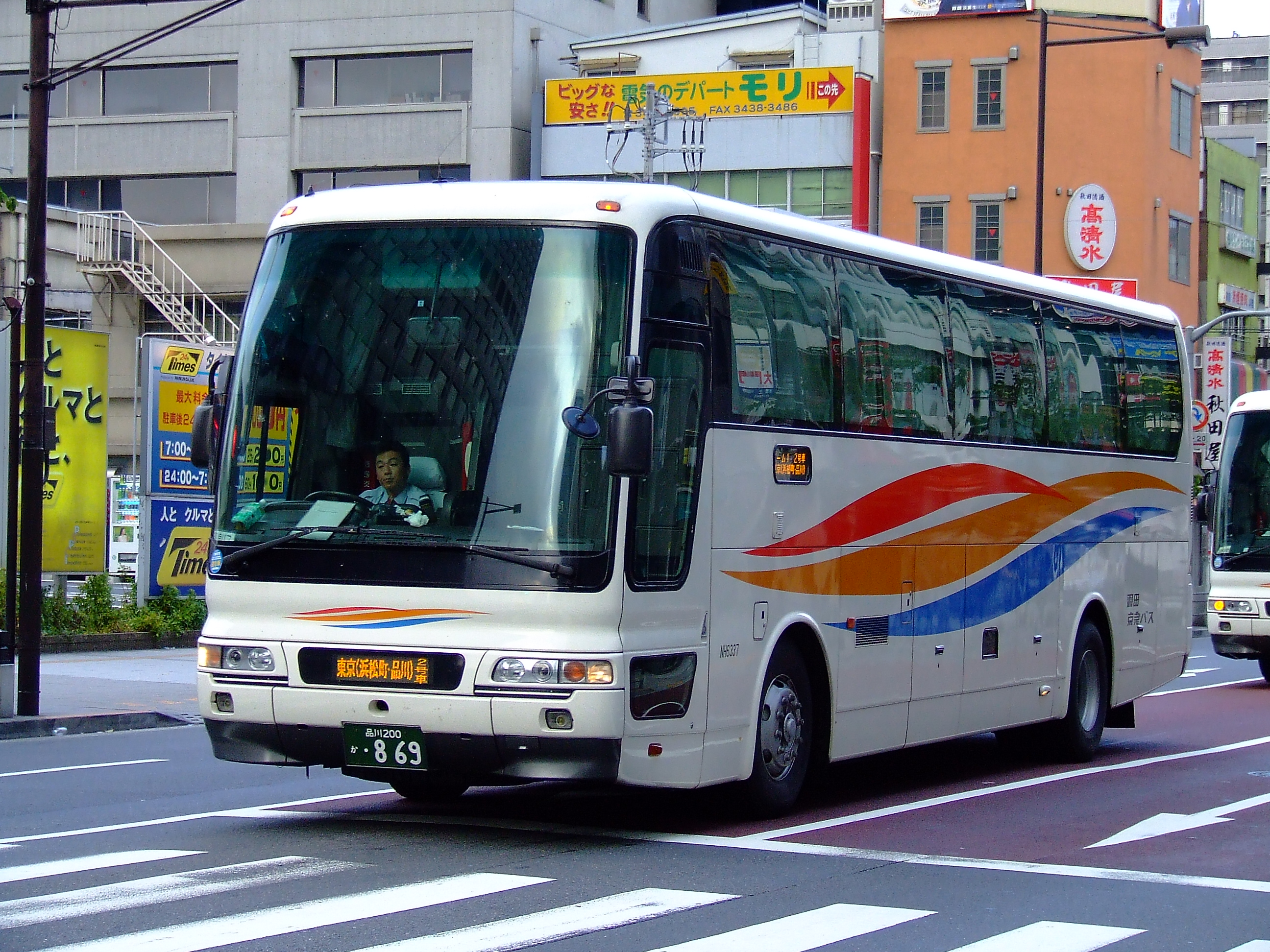
Aero Queen I KL-MS86MP

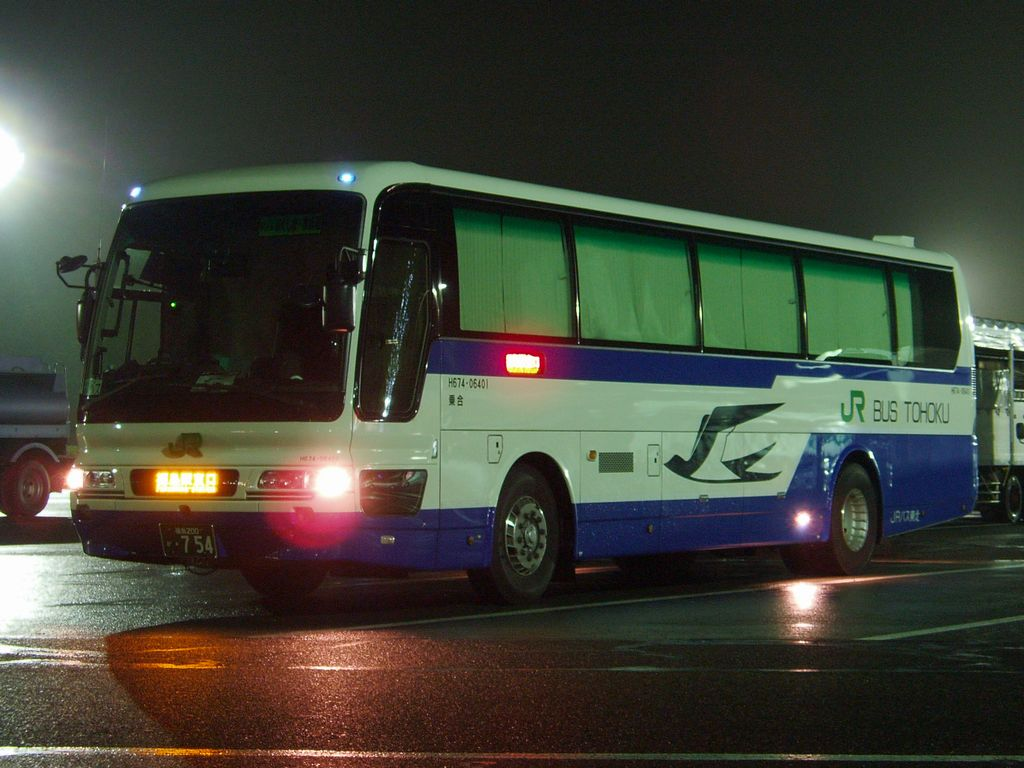
Aero Bus PJ-MS86JP

== Aero Ace/Aero Queen ==
These models are equipped Urea selective catalytic reduction system. (AdBlue needed)

- BKG-MS96JP (2007)
  - 6M70 Engine equipped
- LKG-MS96VP (2010)
  - 6R10 Engine equipped (Developed by MFTBC and Daimler), Wheelbases extended 95mm
- QRG-/QTG-MS96VP (2012)
  - 6R10 Engine equipped
  - Brake override system and side view cameras equipped
- 2TG-MS06GP (2018)
  - 6S10 Engine equipped
  - "ShiftPlot"
  - Active Attention Assist, Active Brake Assist 3, and Proximity Control Assist equipped
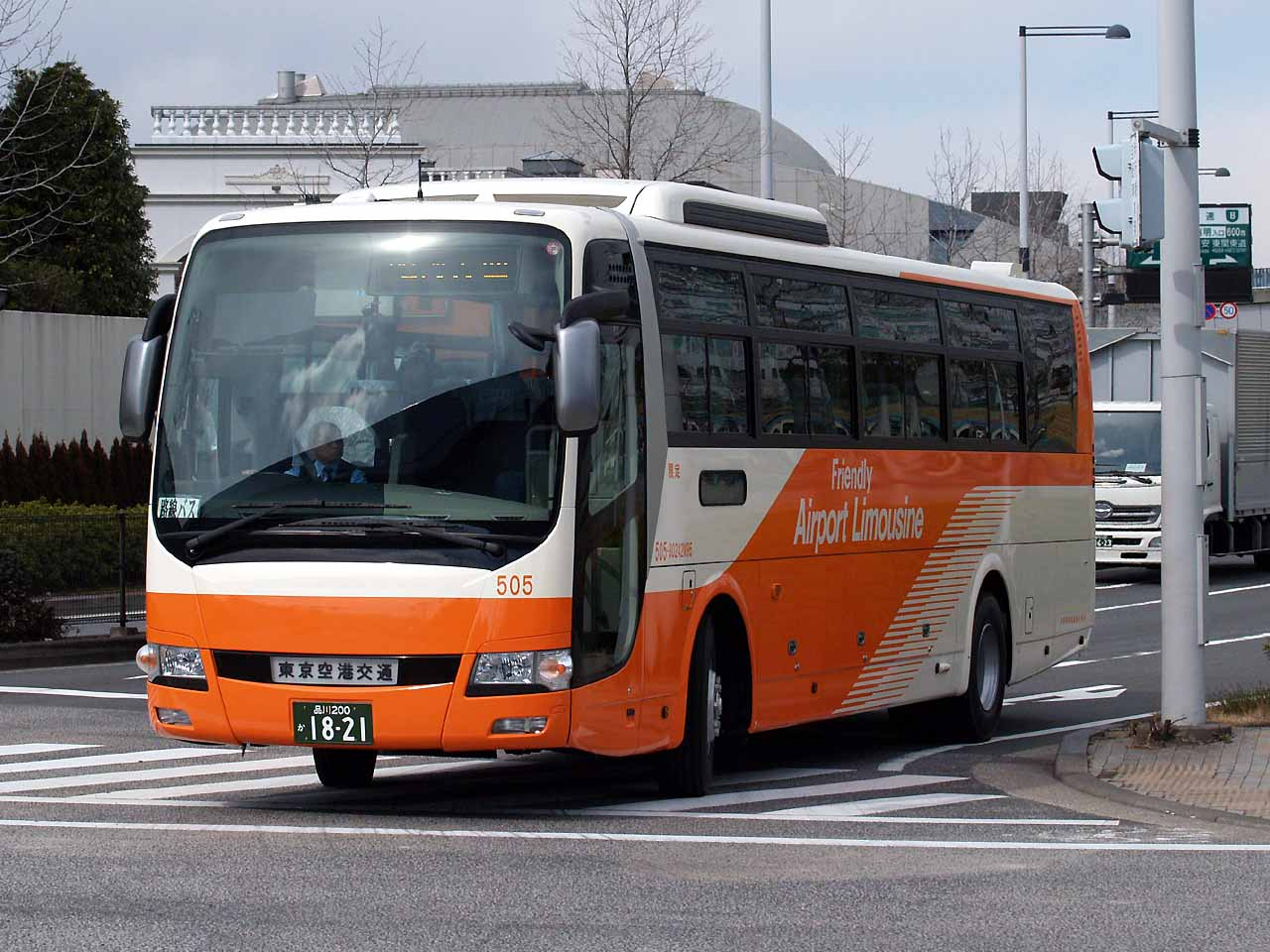
Aero Ace BKG-MS96JP

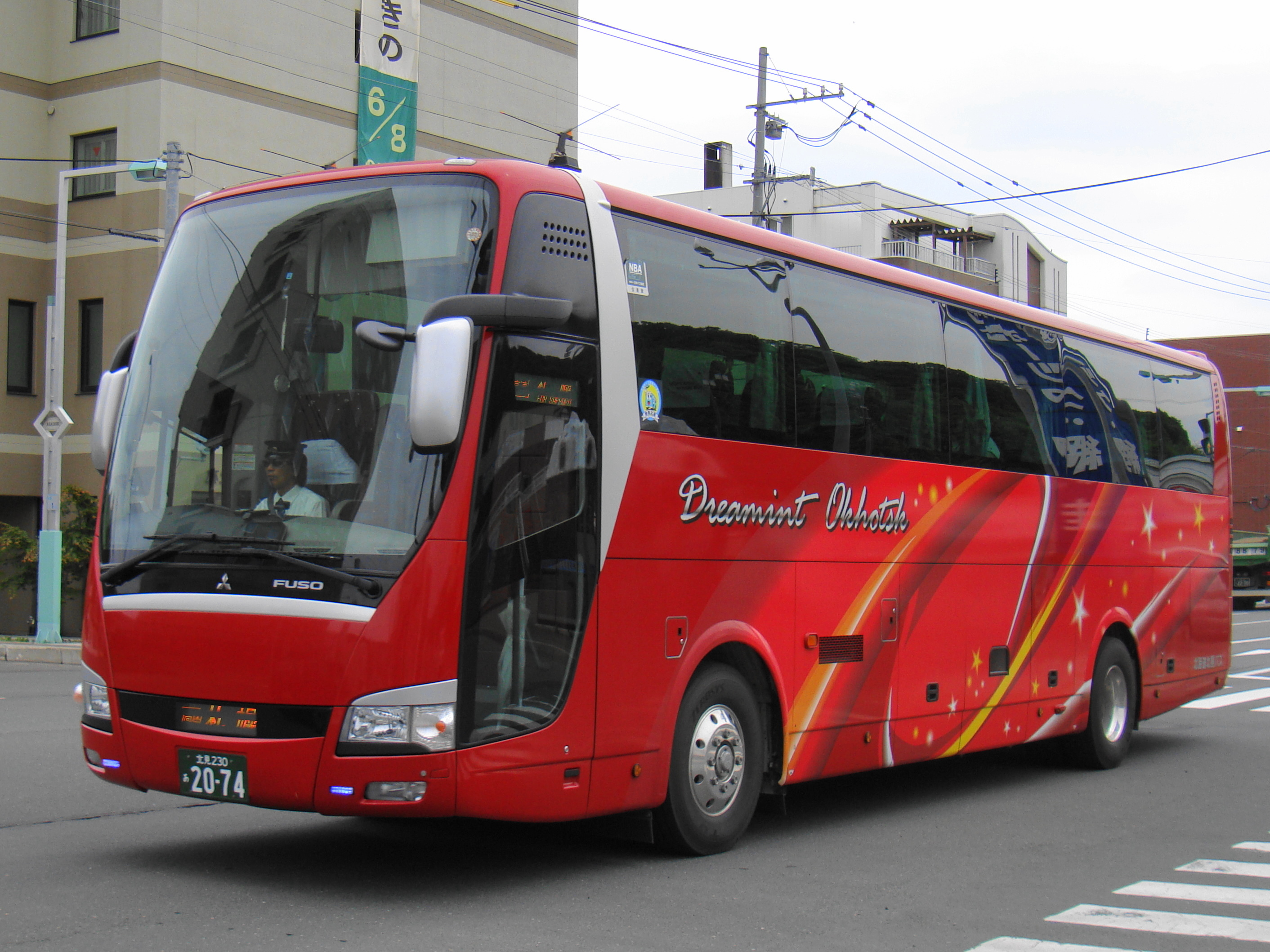
Aero Queen BKG-MS96JP

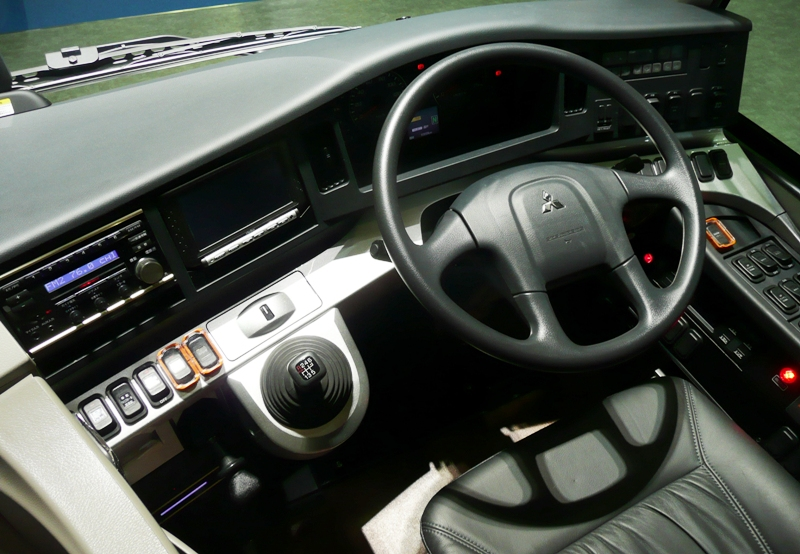
Aero Queen cockpit

== Model lineup ==
- Aero Ace 12m (Hi-decker)
- Aero Queen 12m (Super hi-decker)

=== Logistical lineup ===
- Hi-decker
  - Aero Queen I:12m
  - Aero Queen II:12m
  - Aero Queen III:12m
- Super hi-decker
  - Aero Bus MS EX:12m
  - Aero Bus MS SA:12m
  - Aero Bus MS SX:12m
  - Aero Bus MS SD:12m
  - Aero Bus MS EX:11m
  - Aero Bus MS SX:11m
  - Aero Bus MS SD:11m
  - Aero Bus MM EX:9m
  - Aero Bus MM SD:9m

== See also ==
- Mitsubishi Fuso Truck & Bus Corporation
- Mitsubishi Fuso Aero King - Double-decker coach
- List of buses
