= Space Wing =

Space Wing or variation, may refer to:

== Military ==
- a military unit involved in outer space, which is a type of Wing (military aviation unit)

=== United States military ===
Several units of the United States Air Force involved in outer space duties are designated as Space Wings:

- 91st Space Wing (1997-2008) an ICBM unit
- 50th Space Wing (activated 1992) a unit of the USAF Space Command
- 45th Space Wing (activated 1951) a unit involved in U.S. DOD space launches from Cape Canaveral AFS
- 30th Space Wing (activated 1964) a unit involved in U.S. DOD space launches from Vandenberg AFB
- 21st Space Wing (re-activated 1992) a unit of the USAF Space Command
- 3d Space Wing (1986-1992) a unit of the USAF Space Command
- 2d Space Wing (1985-1992) a unit of the USAF Space Command
- 1st Space Wing (1982-1992) a unit of the USAF Space Command
- 310th Space Wing (re-activated 1997) a unit of the USAF Reserve for Space Command
- 341st Space Wing (1997-2008)
- 460th Space Wing (re-activated 2001) a unit of the USAF Space Command

== Other uses ==
- Nissan Diesel Space Wing, a motorcoach
- Astronaut wings, colloquially

== See also ==
- Space (disambiguation)
- Space Development and Test Wing (activated 2006) a unit of the USAF Space Command
- Starwing (disambiguation)
- Wing (disambiguation)
