= Wingstar =

Wingstar may refer to:

- Wingstar (women's professional ice hockey team) former name (1998-2003) of the Montreal Axion
- Wingstar (superhero) a fictional character created in 2015, from the Indian comic Tinkle, the superhero alterego of Mapui
- Wingstar (dragon) a fictional character from The Immortals novel series by Tamora Pierce, see List of dragons in literature
- Wingstar (video game), a 1996 videogame from Interactivision, see Index of DOS games (W)

== See also ==
- Star (disambiguation)
- Starwing (disambiguation)
- Wing (disambiguation)
