= Starwing =

Starwing, star wings, or variation, may refer to:

== Entertainment and sports ==
- Starwings Basel, the "Starwings" basketball team from Basel, Switzerland
- Star Fox (1993 video game), released as Starwing in PAL regions, first game in the Nintendo Star Fox series
- Starwings, 1984 novel by George Wyatt Proctor
- star wing, the science fiction military unit space equivalent to Wing (military aviation unit)

=== Fictional characters ===
- Leyerlain Starwing (dark elf) a fictional character from the 2001 Dragonlance novel by Nancy Varian Berberick, The Inheritance (novel)

== Aviation ==
- Starwing, a U.S. aircraft manufacturer, see List of aircraft (St)
- EAE European Air Express (1999-2007) callsign STARWING; see List of defunct airlines of Germany
- Astronaut wings, colloquially

== See also ==
- Starwing Paradox (2018 video game; Japanese: 星と翼のパラドクス, romanized: Hoshi to Tsubasa no Paradokusu) an arcade game from Square-Enix
- Space Wing (disambiguation)
- Star (disambiguation)
- Wing (disambiguation)
- Wingstar (disambiguation)
