= Nissan Diesel Space Dream =

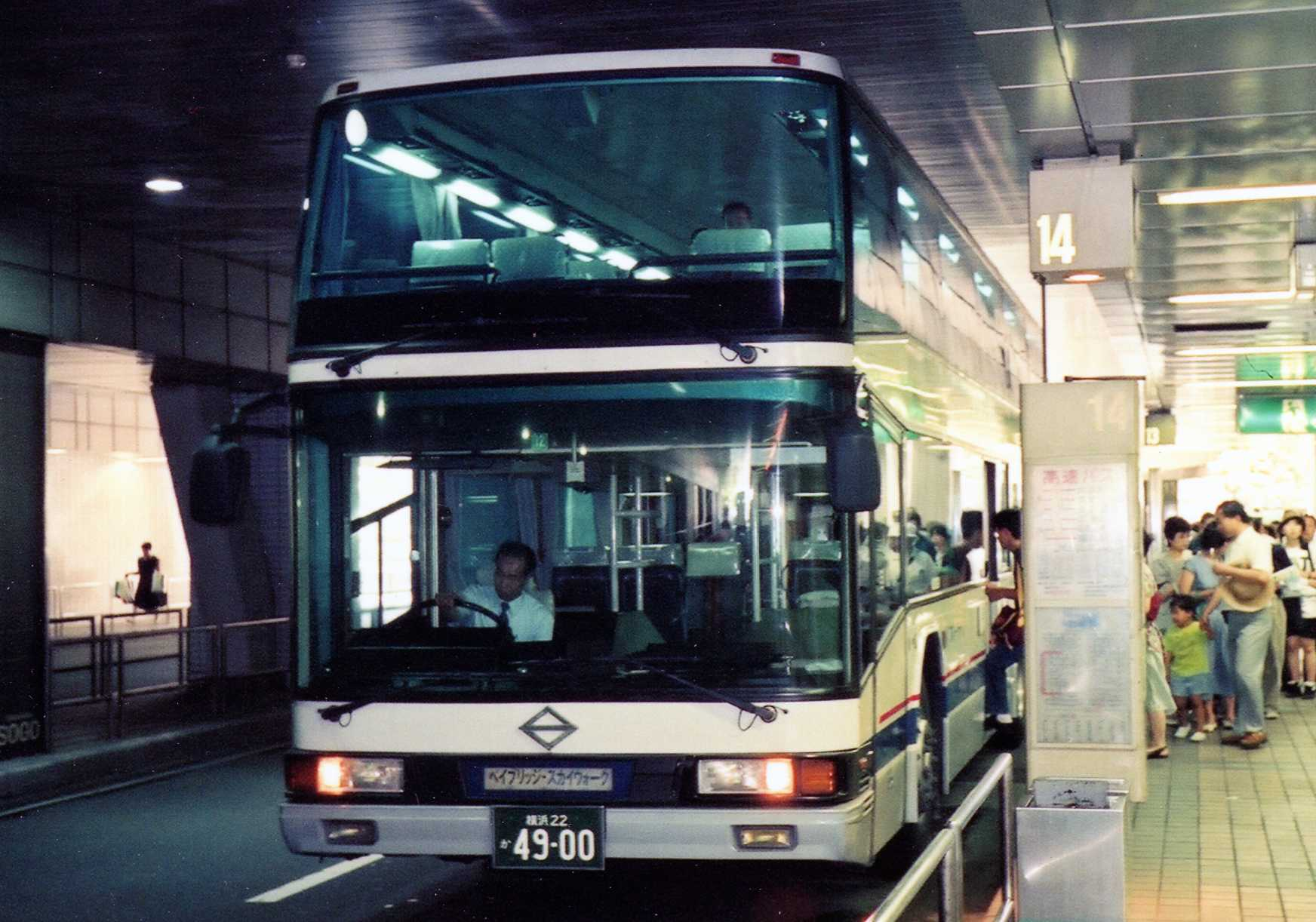

Overview
- Manufacturer: Nissan Diesel
- Production: 1983-2000

Body and chassis
- Class: Coach
- Body style: Double-decker bus
- Doors: 1 door
- Floor type: Step entrance

Powertrain
- Engine: RE10
- Transmission: 6-speed manual

The Nissan Diesel Space Dream (Kana: 日産ディーゼル・スペースドリーム) was a heavy-duty double-deck tourist coach produced by the Japanese manufacturer Nissan Diesel in the 1980s.

== Space Dream (1983-1988) ==
The Space Dream was introduced at the 1983 Tokyo Motor Show, where it was fitted with a Fuji Heavy Industries body. The engine that was used in the Space Dream at this time was:

1984-1988
P-GA66T

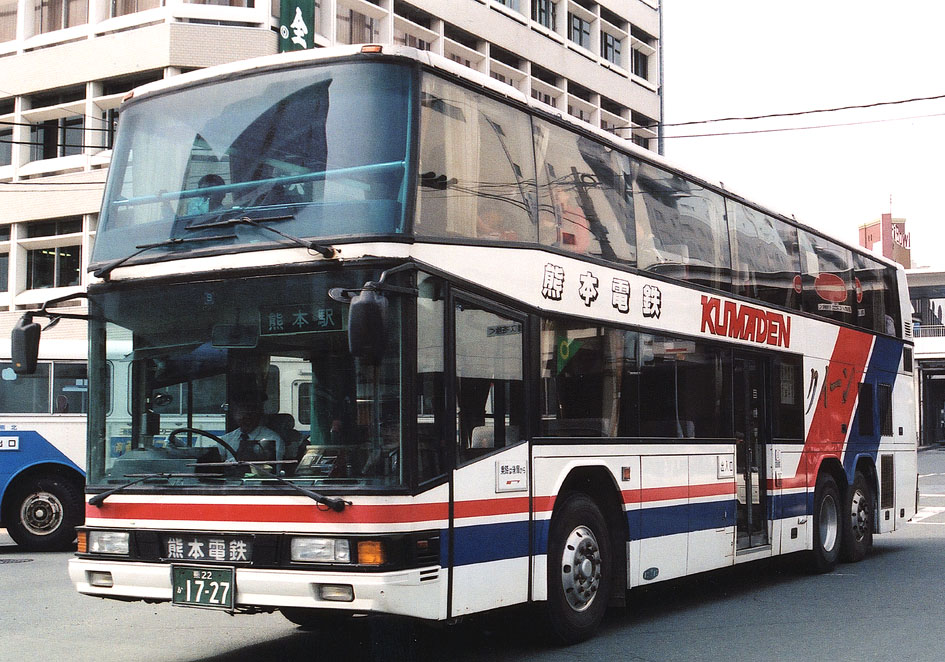
P-GA66T

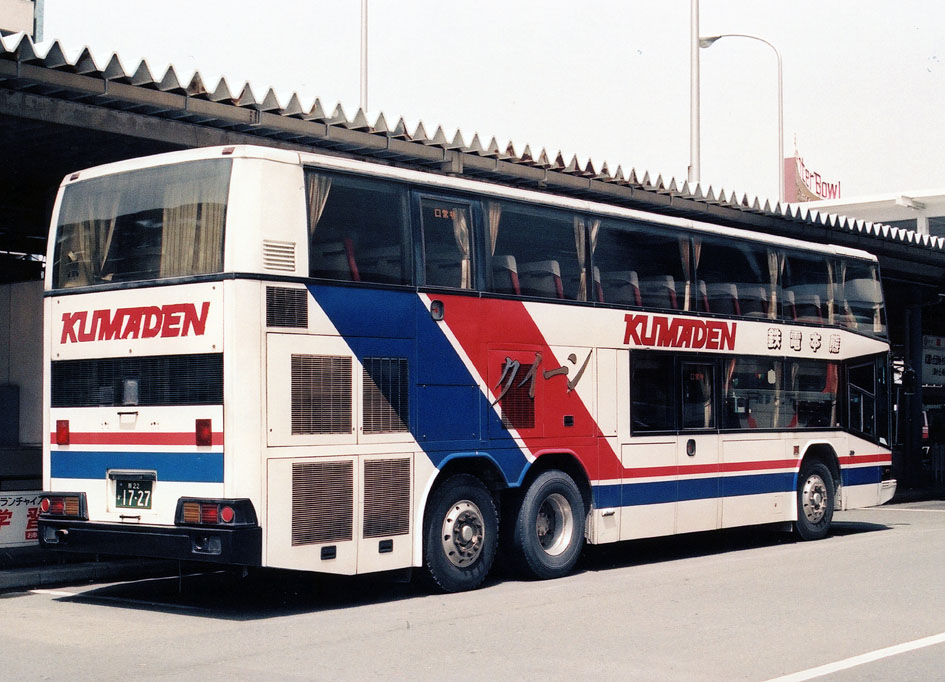
P-GA66T rear

== Jonckheere-bodied double-decker bus (1993-2000) ==
The Nissan Diesel second generation double-decker bus was introduced in 1993, with a new double-decker bus chassis, which was developed from Nissan Diesel Space Wing tri-axle, the new generation bus was fitted with Jonckheere Monaco body.

The engines that were used during this time were:

1993-1995	1995-2000
RG620VBN	RG550VBN

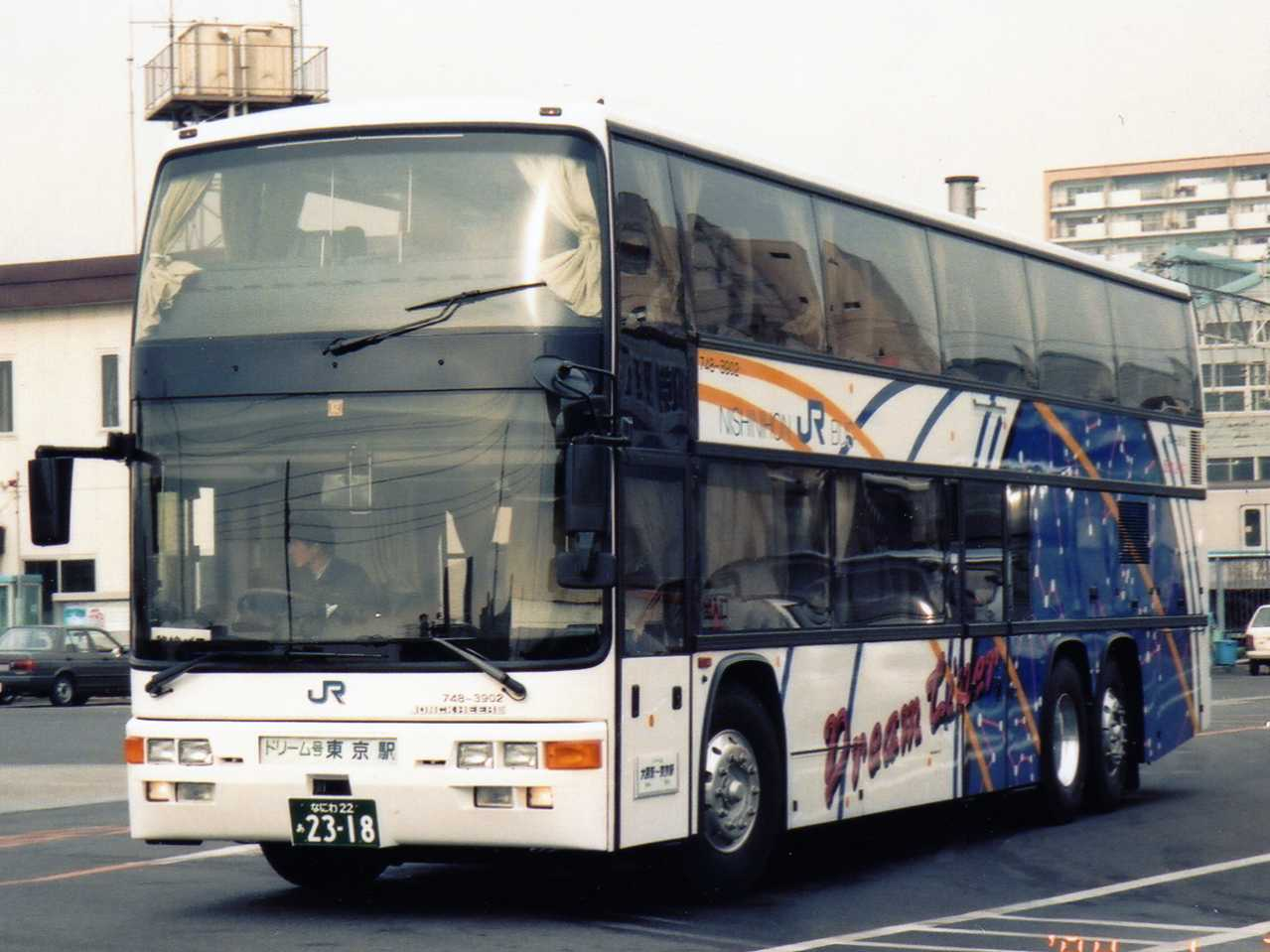
RG620VBN

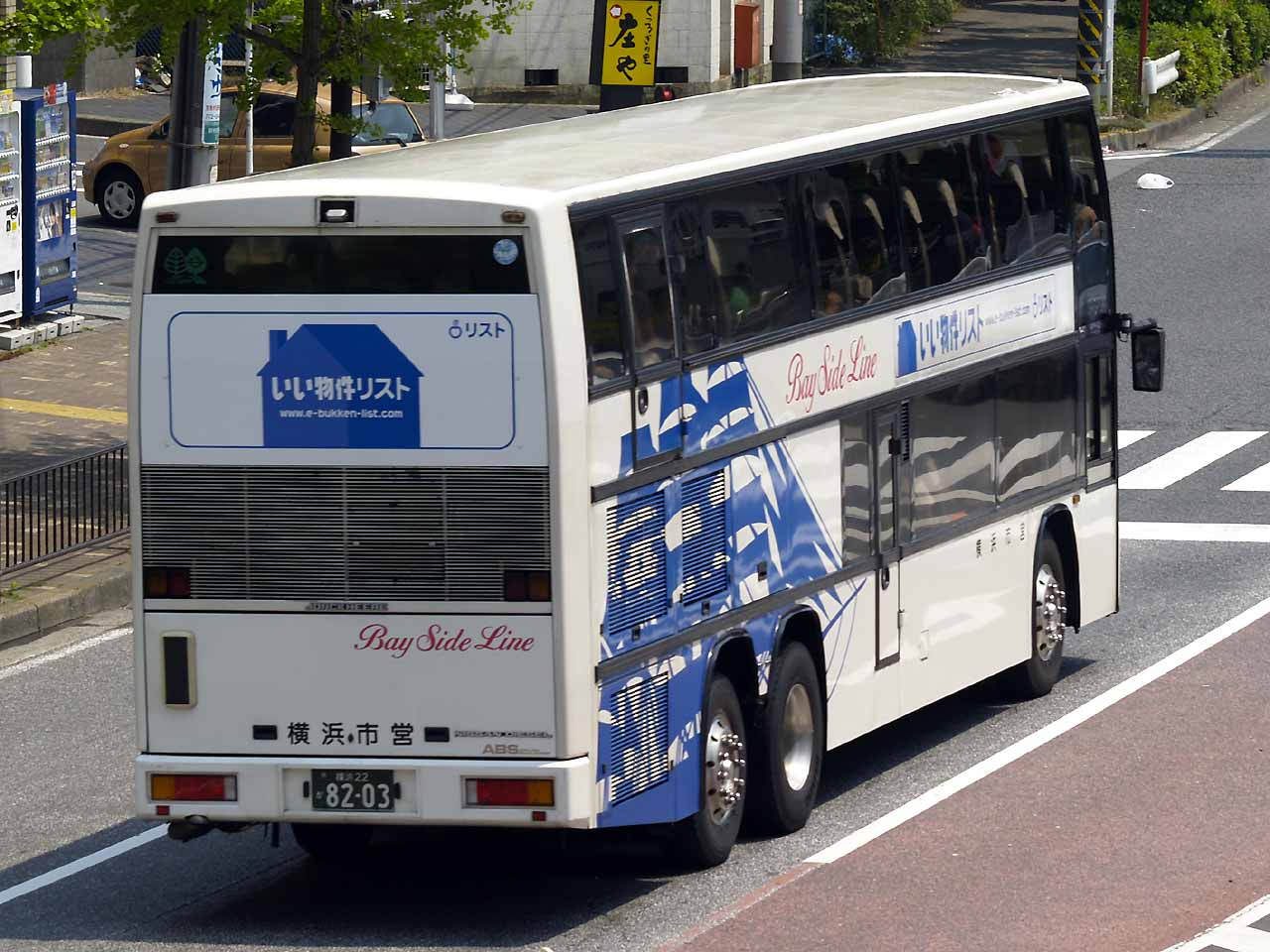
RG620VBN
