= Mitsubishi Fuso Aero King =

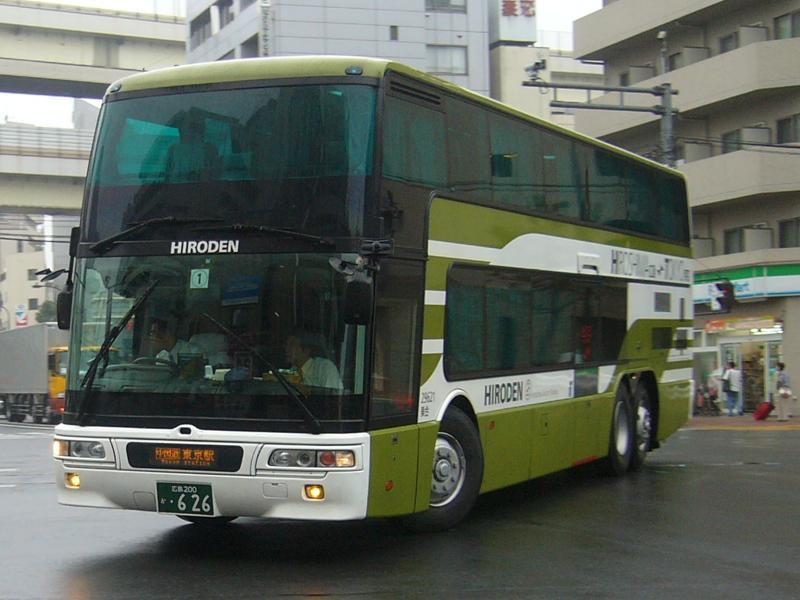

Overview
- Manufacturer: Mitsubishi Motors Corporation; Mitsubishi Fuso Truck and Bus Corporation
- Production: 1984–2005; 2008–2010

Body and chassis
- Class: Complete bus Bus chassis
- Body style: Double-decker coach
- Doors: 2
- Floor type: Step entrance

Powertrain
- Transmission: 6-speed manual

Dimensions
- Length: 12.0m
- Width: 2.5m
- Height: 3.8m

The Mitsubishi Fuso Aero King (kana:三菱ふそう・エアロキング) was a series of heavy-duty double-decker coaches built by Mitsubishi Fuso Truck and Bus Corporation.

The Aero King first went on sale in 1984, after being introduced at the 1983 Tokyo Motor Show, and was discontinued in 2010, after five generations. It was either built as an integral bus or a bus chassis.

The engines that were used in the Fuso Aero Bus were the 8DC9 (turbocharged V-8, 380 PS or 280 kW, used between 1984 and 1995 for MU515TA/MU525TA), the 8M21-3 (NA V-8, 420 PS or 310 kW/430 PS or 320 kW, used between 1995 and 2005 for MU612) and the 6M70-T4 (turbocharged L-6, 420ps, used between 2008 and 2010 for MU66JS).

== Models ==
- P-MU515TA/525TA (1984)
- U-MU525TA (1990)
- KC-MU612TA (1995)
- MU612TX (2000)
- BKG-MU66JS (2008)
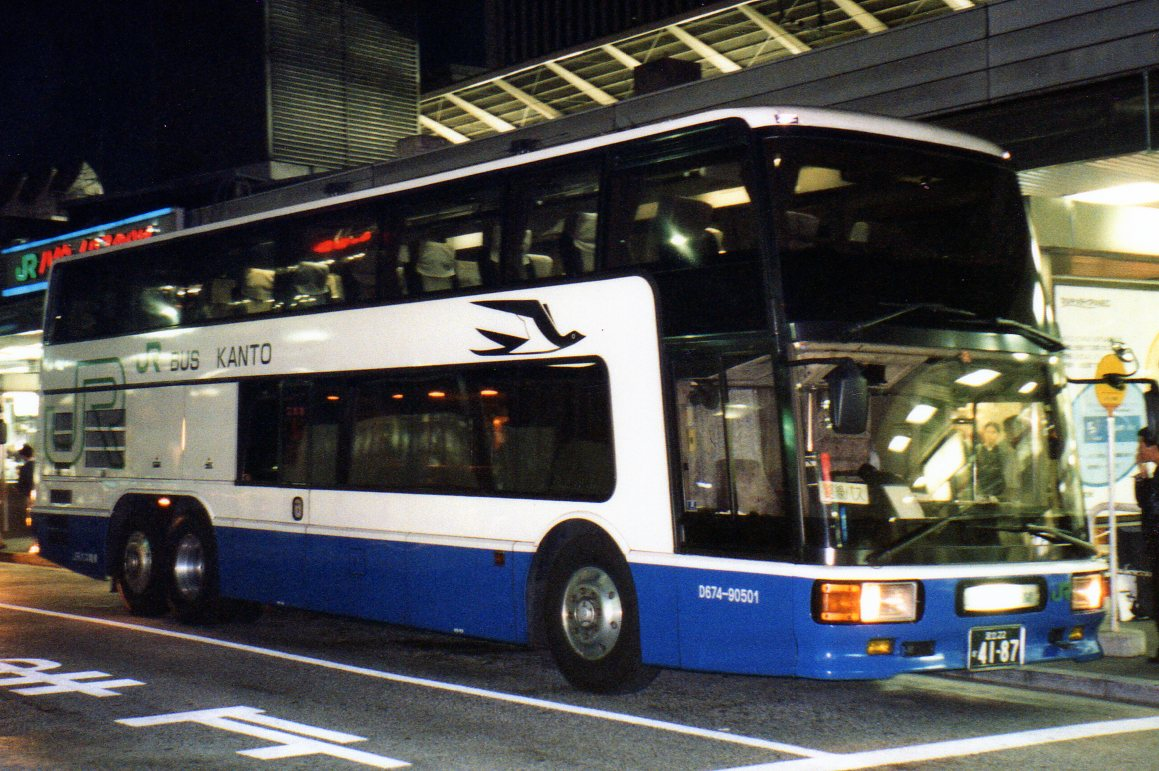
Aero King P-MU525TA

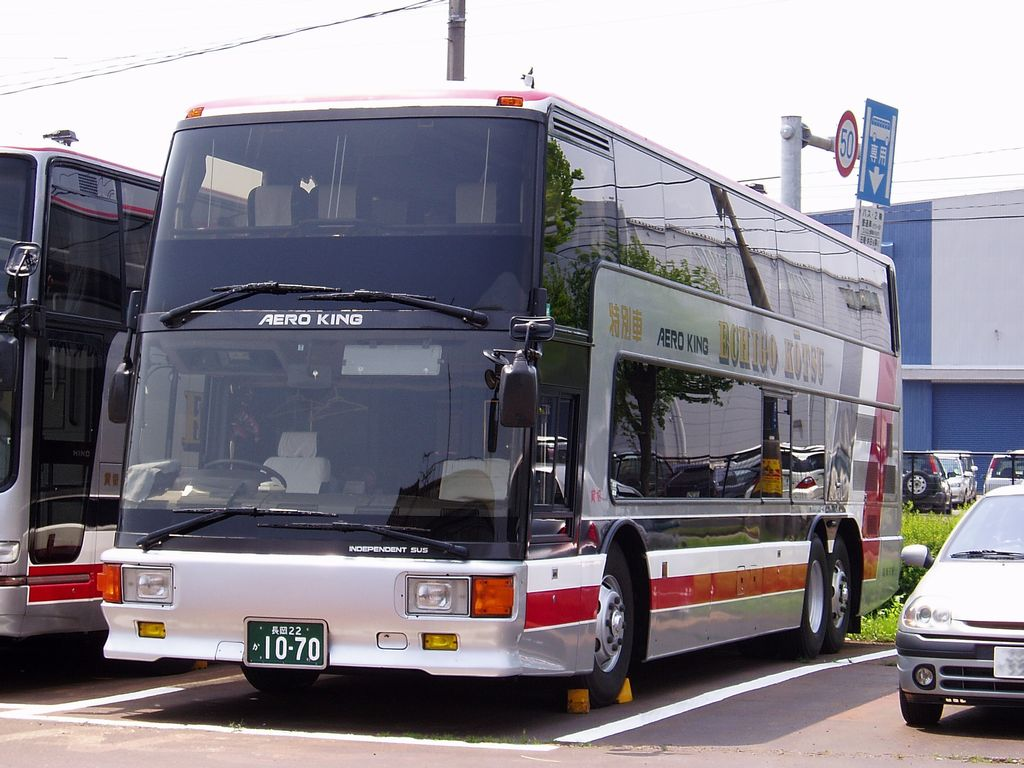
Aero King U-MU525TA

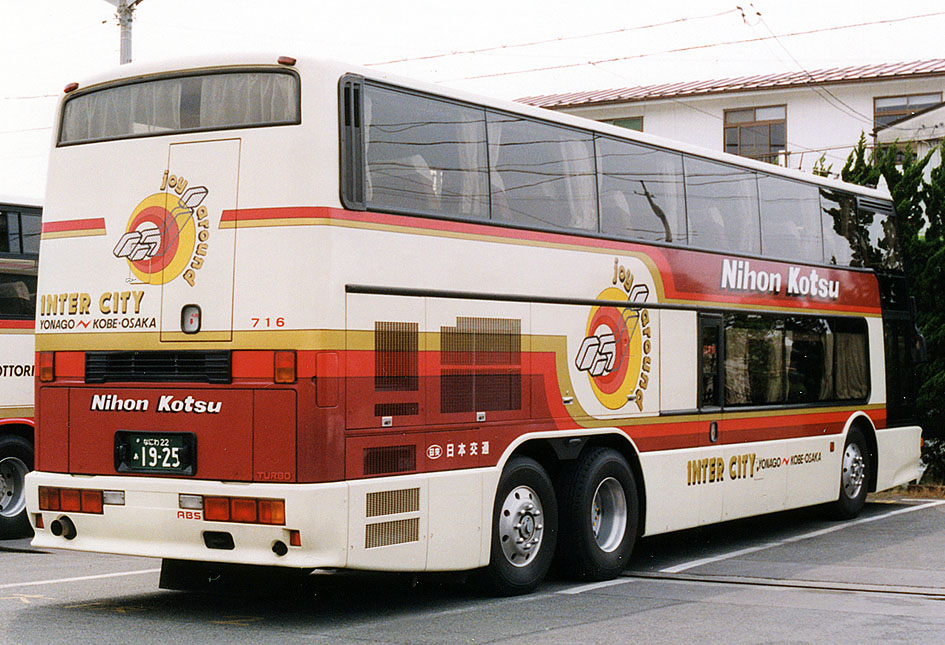
Aero King U-MU525TA rear

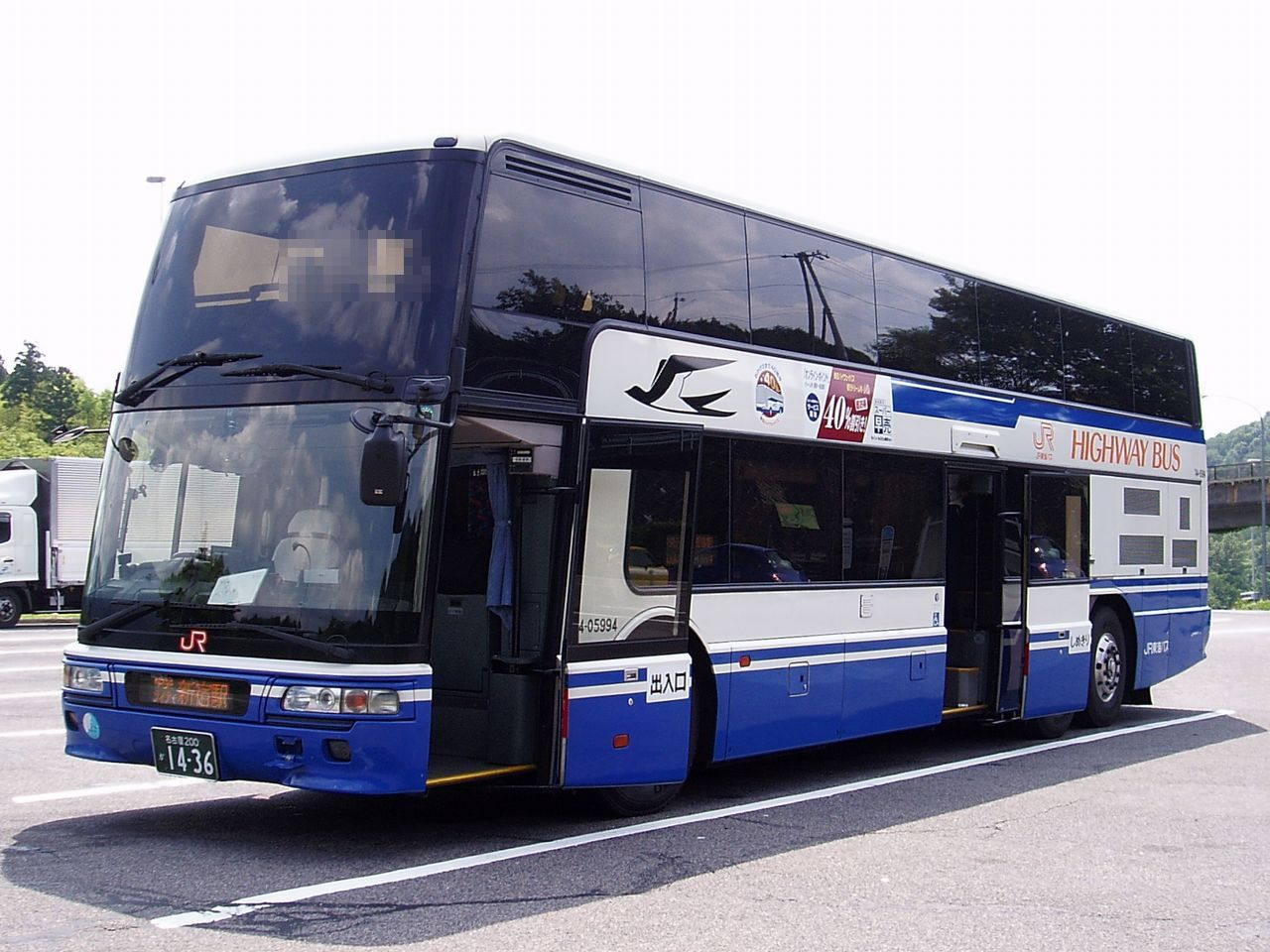
Aero King MU612TX

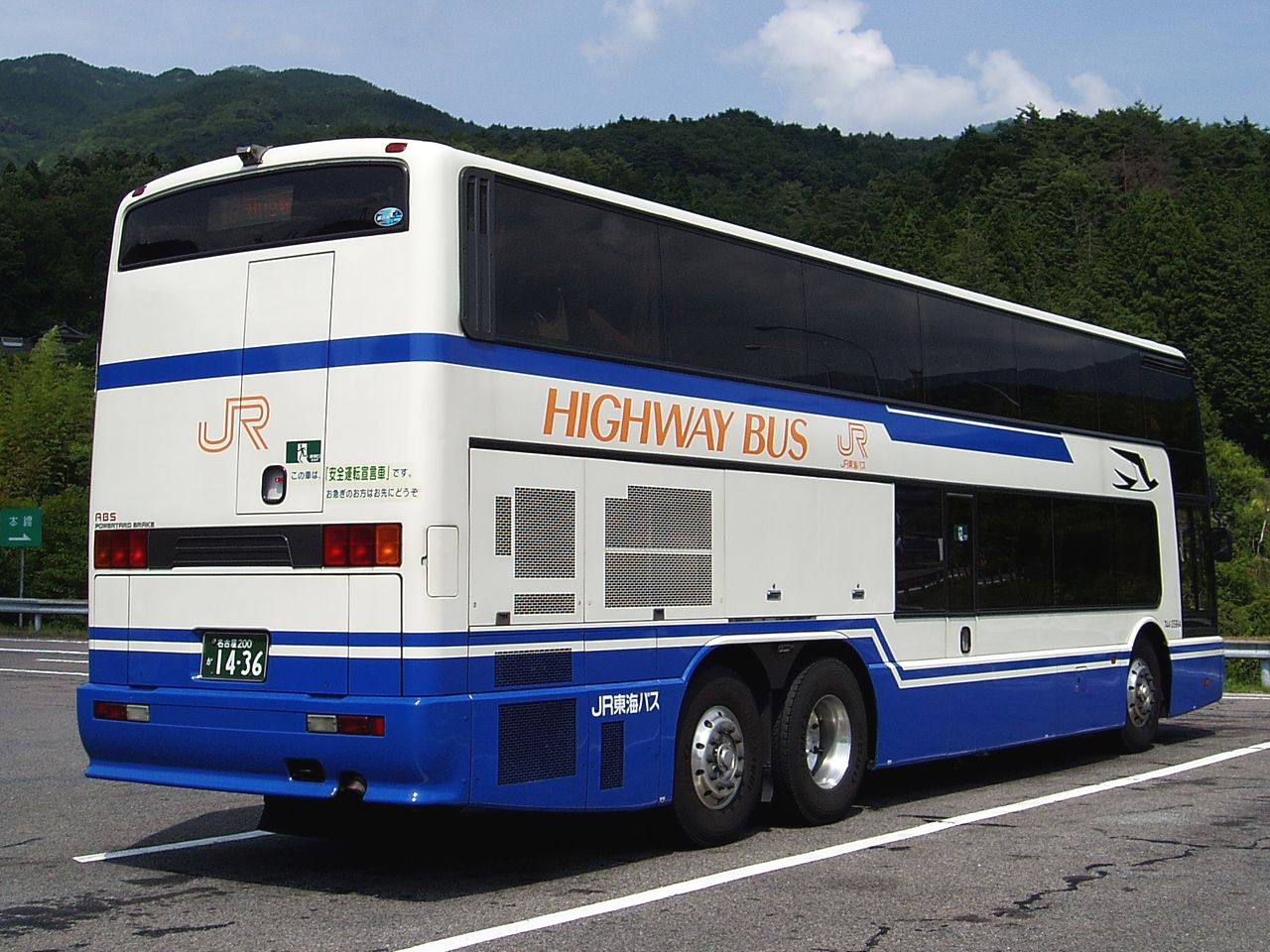
Aero King MU612TX

== See also ==
- Hino Grand View
- Van Hool Astromega
- List of buses
- Mitsubishi Fuso Truck and Bus Corporation
- Nissan Diesel Space Dream
