= Optik Software =

Optik Software is a former game development company, best known for creating the DOS game War Inc. in 1997.

== See also ==
- Index of DOS games
