= World Empire =

- Developer: Viable Software Alternatives
- Publisher: Viable Software Alternatives
- Designer: Casey Butler
- Platforms: MS-DOS, Windows
- Release: 1991
- Genre: Turn-based strategy
- Modes: Single-player, multiplayer

World Empire is a turn-based strategy video game, released as shareware in 1991 by Viable Software Alternatives. Players compete to conquer the Earth country by country through military force.

== Gameplay ==
Each player is controlled by either a human or the computer; recent versions of the game have included the option of network play. At the beginning of the game, the players choose a unique political ideology, select or are assigned a flag and a home country, and are given the same number of armies. Each country on the map is assigned a political ideology. Players then take turns during which they attack neighbouring countries and, if successful, occupy them with some of their armies. If the occupied country's political ideology matches that of the player, then only one occupying army is needed; otherwise, the game informs the player how many more occupying armies are required. If the player fails to maintain the minimum number of occupying armies in a country, the country may revolt and switch allegiances to another player. Players can end their turns at any time, and usually do so when they have no further armies with which to attack. At the beginning of each turn other than the first, players receives a number of armies calculated from the number of countries they hold, plus a bonus if they control entire continents.

The game ends once one player has occupied all the opponents' countries, or when all the opponents have surrendered.

== Release ==
World Empire was originally released for MS-DOS as shareware. It has 16-colour EGA graphics and a classical musical score played through the PC speaker.

== Reception ==
The game was favourably reviewed in PC Plus, Computer Shopper, Windows User, and Computer Gaming World. World Empire III won 1995's Best Shareware Strategy Game Award from Ziff-Davis and Computer Gaming World.

== Legacy ==
Four more games in the series were released.

Version	OS	Release date
World Empire II	Windows 3.x	1992
World Empire III	Windows 3.x	1994
World Empire IV	Windows 3.x	1996
World Empire V	Windows 95	2003
