= Where in the U.S.A. Is Carmen Sandiego? Deluxe =

1992 video game

- Developer(s): Broderbund
- Publisher(s): Broderbund
- Series: Carmen Sandiego
- Platform(s): DOS, Classic Mac OS, Microsoft Windows
- Release: 1992
- Genre(s): Educational
- Mode(s): Single-player

Where in the U.S.A. Is Carmen Sandiego? Deluxe is a video game developed as a remake of the 1986 title Where in the U.S.A. Is Carmen Sandiego?. It is sometimes considered Version 2.0 alongside World and Space. CD-ROM versions for DOS and Macintosh were released in 1992, and a Windows version was released in 1994. The game featured additional animation and a reworked interface from the 1985 version.

The game was preceded by the "Enhanced version" of Where in The USA is Carmen Sandiego?, which was released in 1989.

== Updates from 1985 version ==
OldGame explains "This game features a database of information about all of the states. There are tons of facts about each state's geography, landmarks, history, economy, and culture. There are also photos, video clips, maps, flags, and music." The game "features high-resolution graphics, digitized sound effects, and new locations."

== Gameplay ==
The goal of the game is to track Carmen's henchmen across the US, arrest them, and ultimately arrest Carmen Sandiego. The player will be given information on the suspect which is used to obtain a warrant on them so as to narrow down the suspect to one of the V.I.L.E. members in the database.

MobyGames explains: "Sign your name up, then listen to the chief give you details about the suspect and the loot stolen by them, the location where the suspect was last seen, and the deadline by which you have to apprehend the suspect by. Question witnesses and contact informants to get information on the next location that the suspect headed to, as well as any information that could lead to a warrant. (You cannot arrest the suspect without one.) Determining where to go next will require research on your part, as everyone you question will reveal places, not cities that appear on the travel map. When you have decided where you should go next, you can travel to the next location. And from there, the above process gets repeated until you finally caught up with the suspect. A new feature on this map allows you to zoom in to a state, allowing you to look closer on its towns and terrain, and its surrounding states. If you select the wrong state, the locals who you talk to won't have any information for you. If you chose the correct state, then you will see bumbling criminals running around."

== Critical reception ==
The game has a rating of 4 out of 5 at MyAbandonware. OldGames describes it as "educational, yet fun".
