= World Hockey 95 =

1995 video game

- European cover art
- Developer: Merit Studios
- Publisher: SoftKey
- Platform: DOS
- Release: 1995
- Genre: Sports
- Modes: Single-player, multiplayer

World Hockey 95 is a sports video game developed by American company Merit Studios and published by SoftKey for DOS. The game had different titles in various regions including Alex Dampier Pro Hockey 95, Alex Dampier World Hockey 95, and Pro Hockey.

== Gameplay ==
World Hockey 95 features full-motion video commentary and a three-quarter perspective view of the playfield.

== Reception ==
Reception

Review scores
Publication	Score
Computer Game Review	52/100
Computer Gaming World	1/5
Joystick	120/200
Micromanía	74/100
Next Generation	1/5
PC Gamer (US)	53%
PC Games (DE)	81%
PC Zone	66/100
Electronic Entertainment	1/5
Excalibur	45/100
Games World: The Magazine	36%
MikroBitti	30/100
PC Games (UK)	73%
PC Home	71%
PC Joker	52%
PC Power	76%
Play Time	40%
Score	2/10
Secret Service	77%

Next Generation reviewed the PC version of the game, rating it one star out of five, and stated that "this game deserves some credit for being the only PC product around that lets you play hockey on the international level. So, if you are absolutely dying for the ability to play hockey on your PC, and you want a rematch of Team USA vs. Canada, this will suffice ... barely." It received a largely negative review from Computer Game Review; the magazine's Tasos Kaiafas concluded, "Steer clear!"

In 1996, Computer Gaming World declared World Hockey the 26th-worst computer game ever released.
