= War Inc. =

1997 video game

- Developer: Optik Software
- Publisher: Interactive Magic
- Platform: DOS
- Release: September 5, 1997
- Genre: Real-time strategy

War Inc. (Project Airos in Australia and Germany) is a real-time strategy video game developed by Optik Software. It was published by Interactive Magic for DOS on September 5, 1997. It incorporates a rudimentary stock market, placing the player directly in control of research and development, and the ability to completely customize units by using a variety of components.

== Reception ==
Reception

Review scores
Publication	Score
Game Revolution	B+
GameSpot	5.2/10

GameSpot gave War Inc. an overall score of 5.2 out of ten, expressing that the game 'doesn't meet its potential' in that it has innovative and 'varied' gameplay options, but its combat and map design is "subpar" and "boring". Game Revolution praised War Inc.'s 'varied' technology trees and high degree of unit customization, further expressing that War Inc. sets itself apart from the "stagnating genre of real-time strategy games", giving it an overall score of a B+.
