= Nissan Diesel Space Arrow =

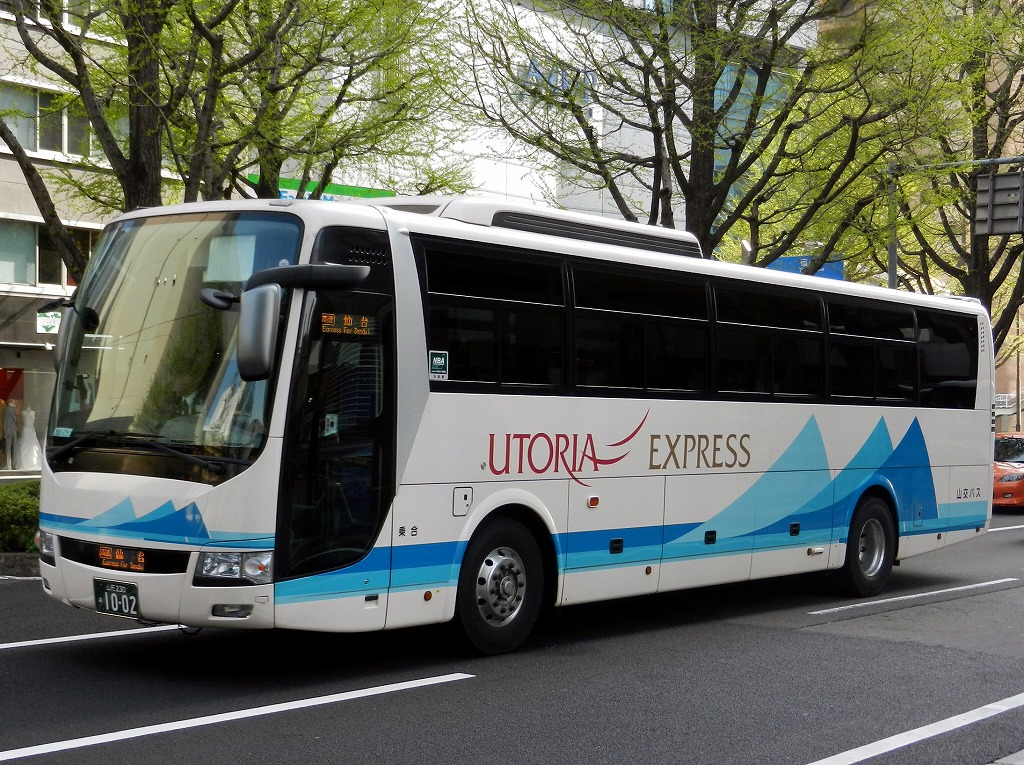

Overview
- Manufacturer: Nissan Diesel
- Production: 1985-2010

Body and chassis
- Class: Commercial vehicle
- Body style: Single-deck coach

Powertrain
- Engine: Nissan Diesel MD92TK / Mitsubishi Fuso 6R10, 6 speed cylinder
- Transmission: 6-speed manual ZF6-speed automatic

The Nissan Diesel Space Arrow (kana:日産ディーゼル・スペースアロー) is a heavy-duty coach produced by the Japanese manufacturer Nissan Diesel from 1985 until 2010. The range was primarily available as tourist coach.

== RA Series ==
- RA50 (1973)
- K-RM51 (1980)
- P-RA52 (1984)
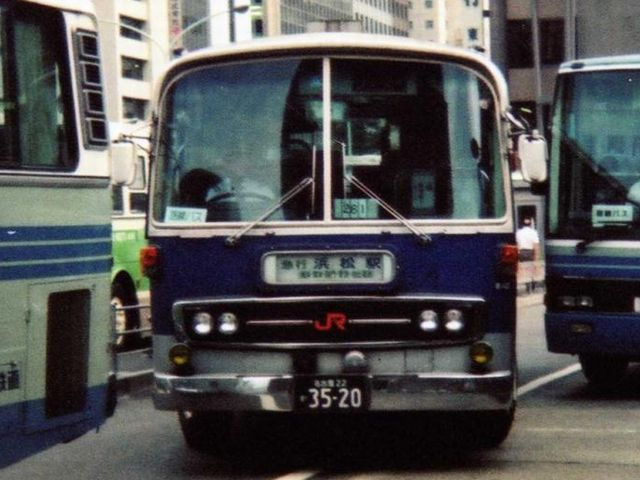
RA K-RA60S

== Space Arrow RA/Space Wing I ==
In 2005, Space Arrow RA/Space Wing I engine was changed to MD92TK. The MD92TK engine uses AdBlue Urea Selective Catalytic Reduction technology and ZF Ecomat 2 Plus 6-speed automatic equipped (6-speed manual deleted from lineup).

- P-RA46/53 (1985)
- U-RA520/530 (1990)
- KC-RA531/550 (1995)
- KL-RA552 (2000)
- ADG-RA273 (2005)
- PKG-RA274 (2006)
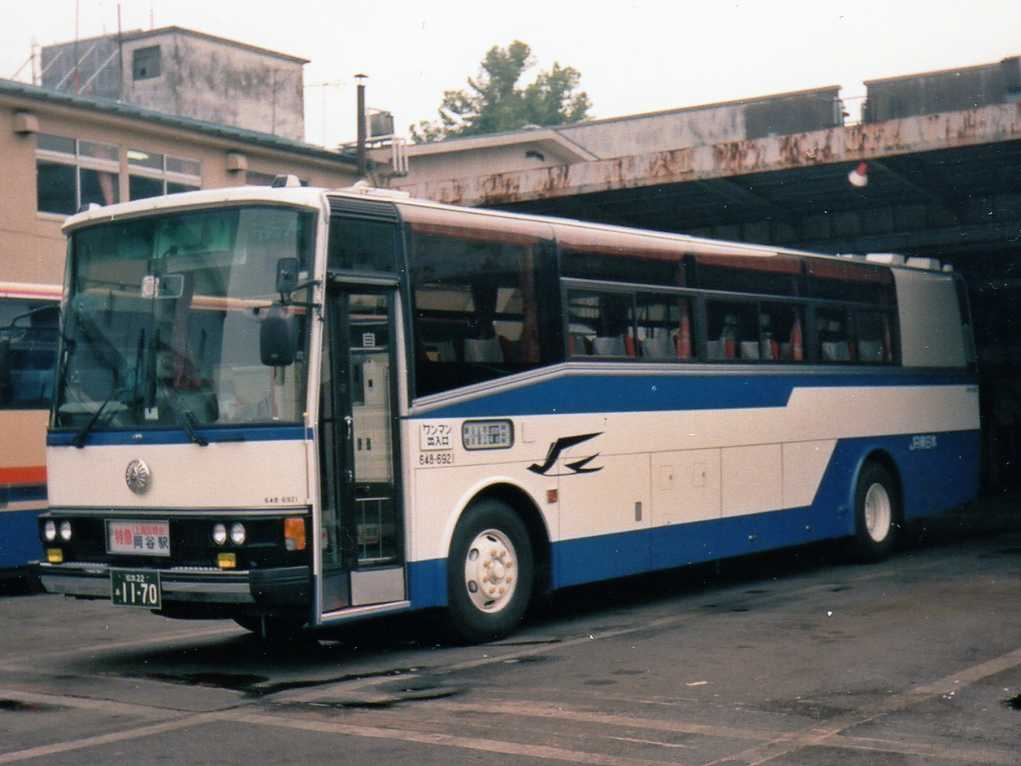
Space Arrow RA P-RA53T

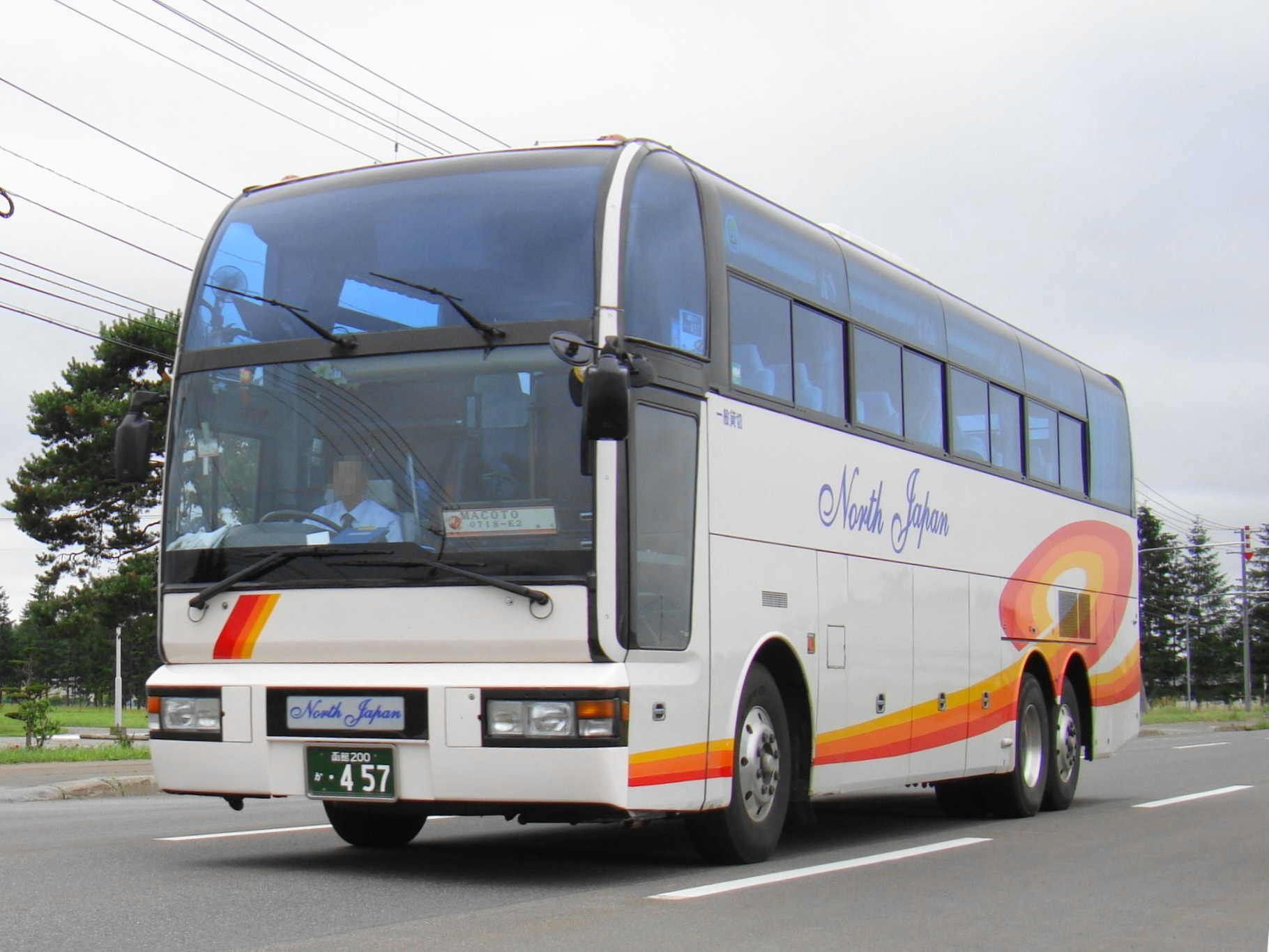
Space Wing II U-RD620UBN

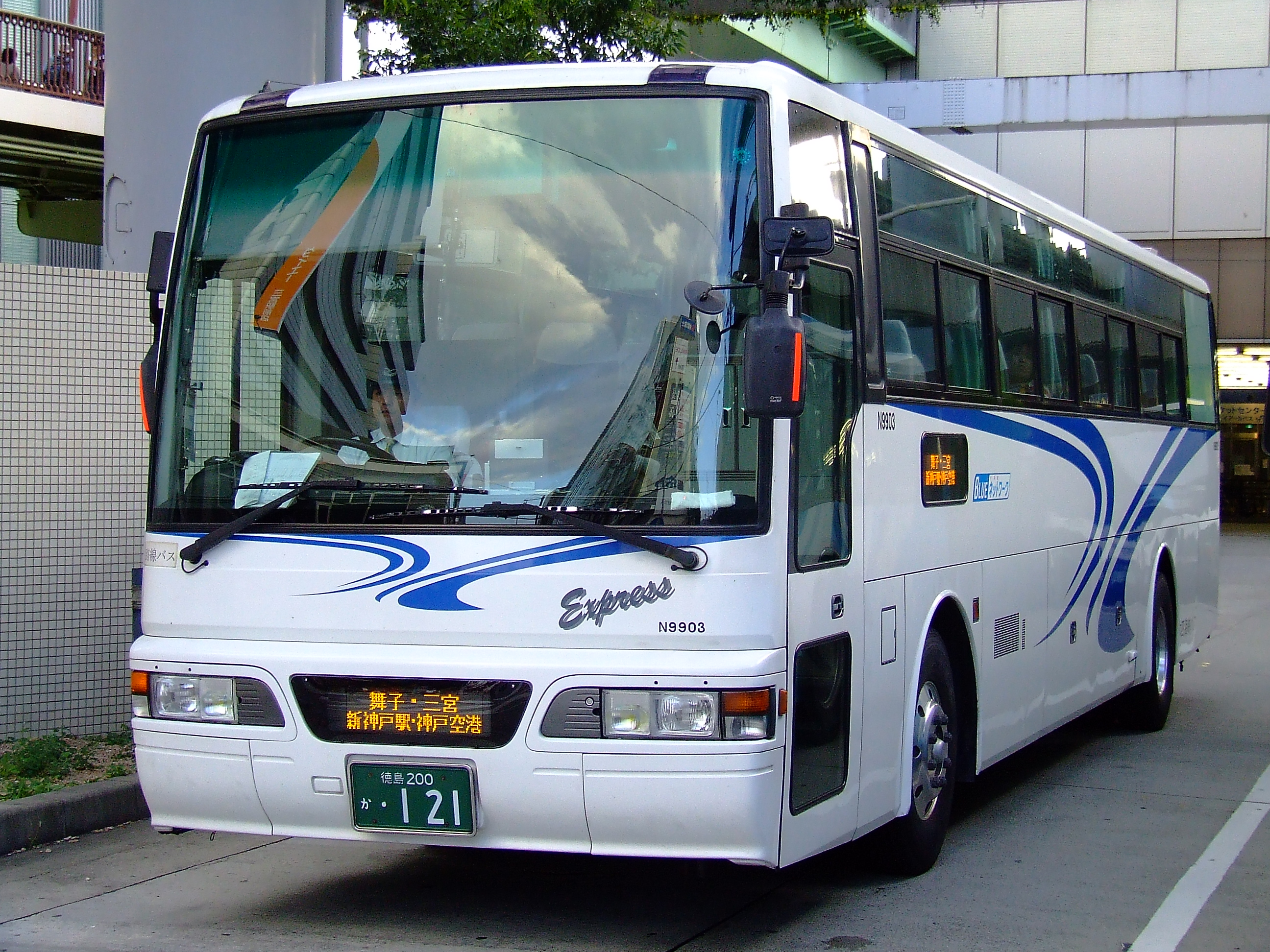
Space Arrow RA KC-RA531RBN

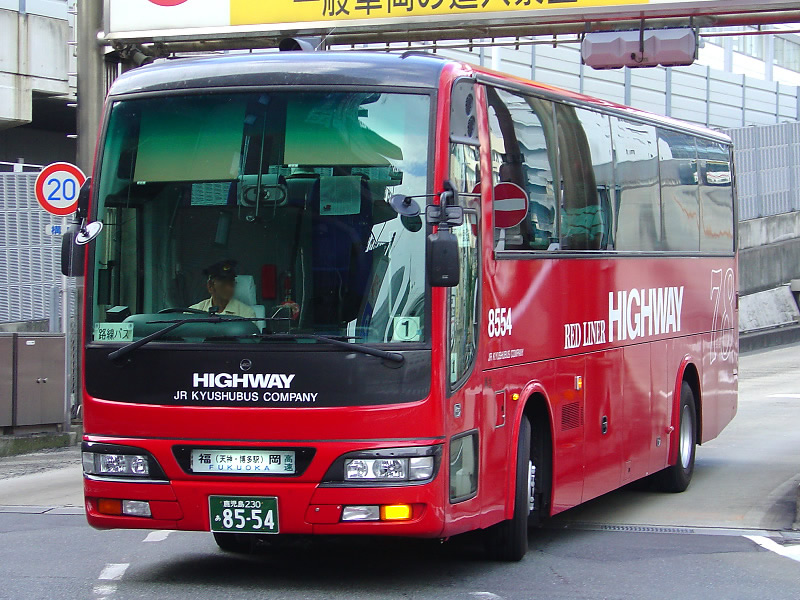
Space Wing I KL-RA552RBN

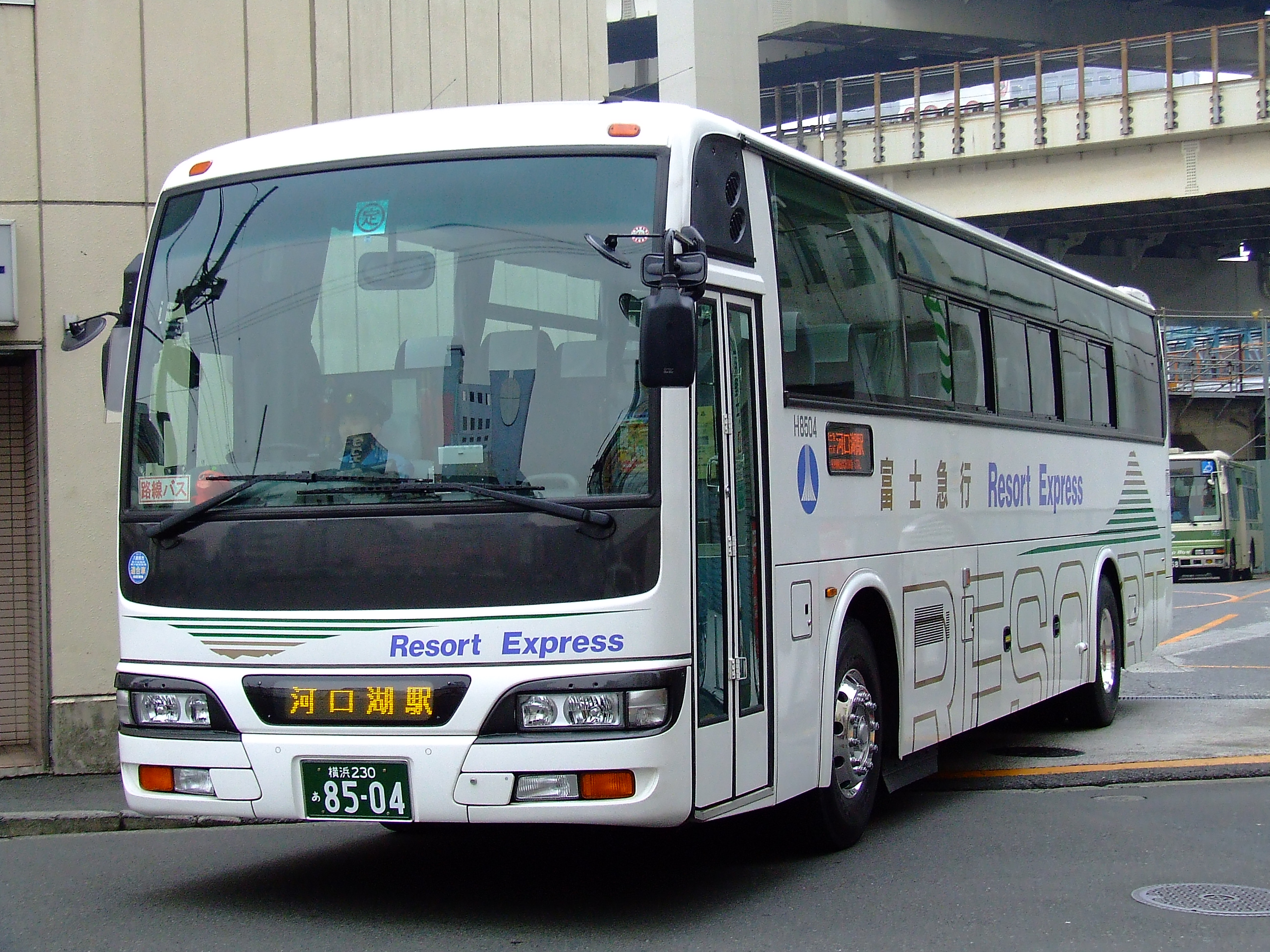
Space Arrow RA KL-RA552RBN

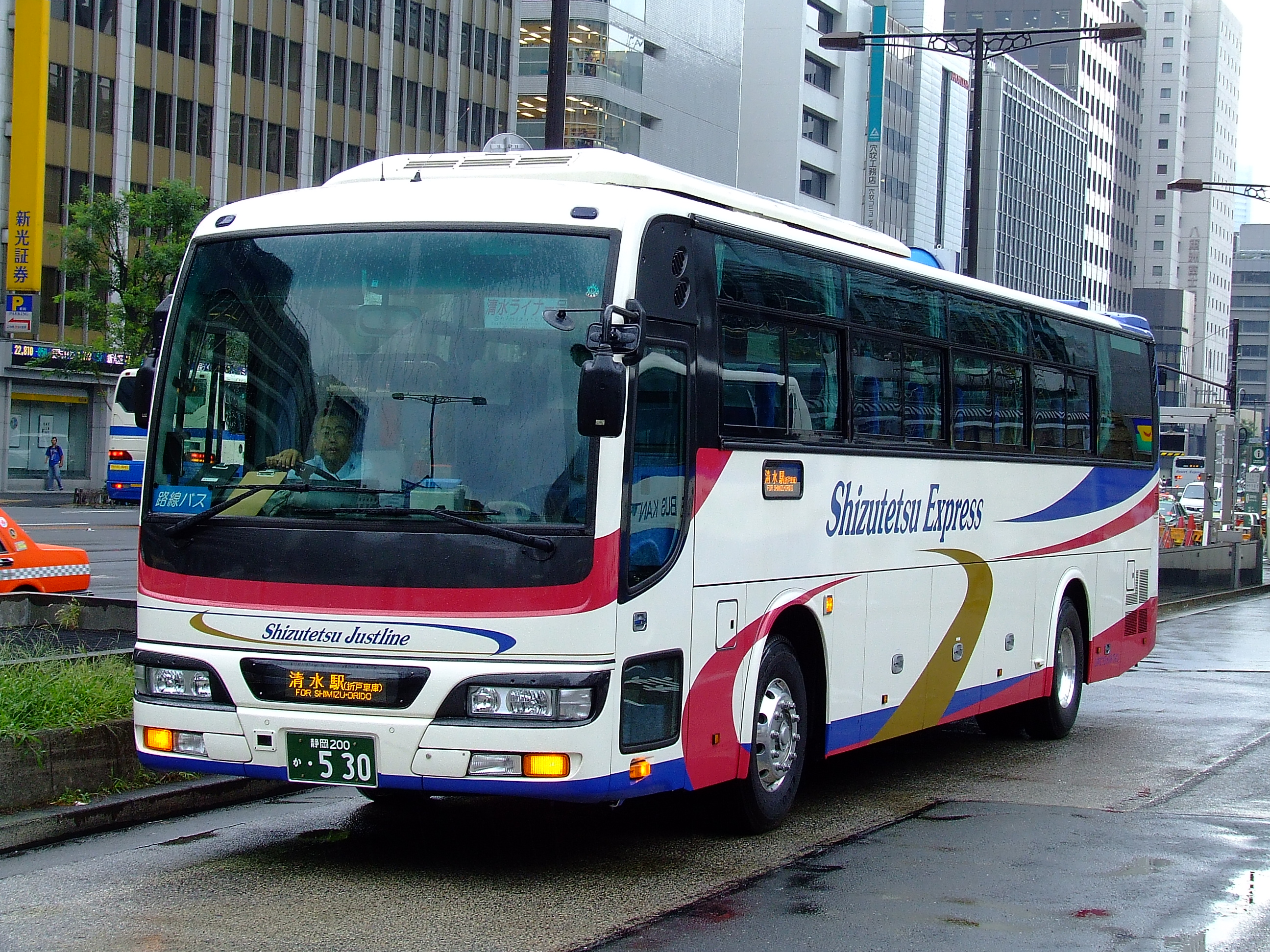
Space Arrow RA PKG-RA274RBN

== Space Arrow Euro Tour (1996-2001) ==
The Space Arrow Euro Tour also called as "Euro Bus" is fitted with a Nissan Diesel Philippines body (based Jonckheere Deauville).

- JA530RAN (RG8) (1996) - 350ps version
- JA520RAN (RF8) - 310ps version
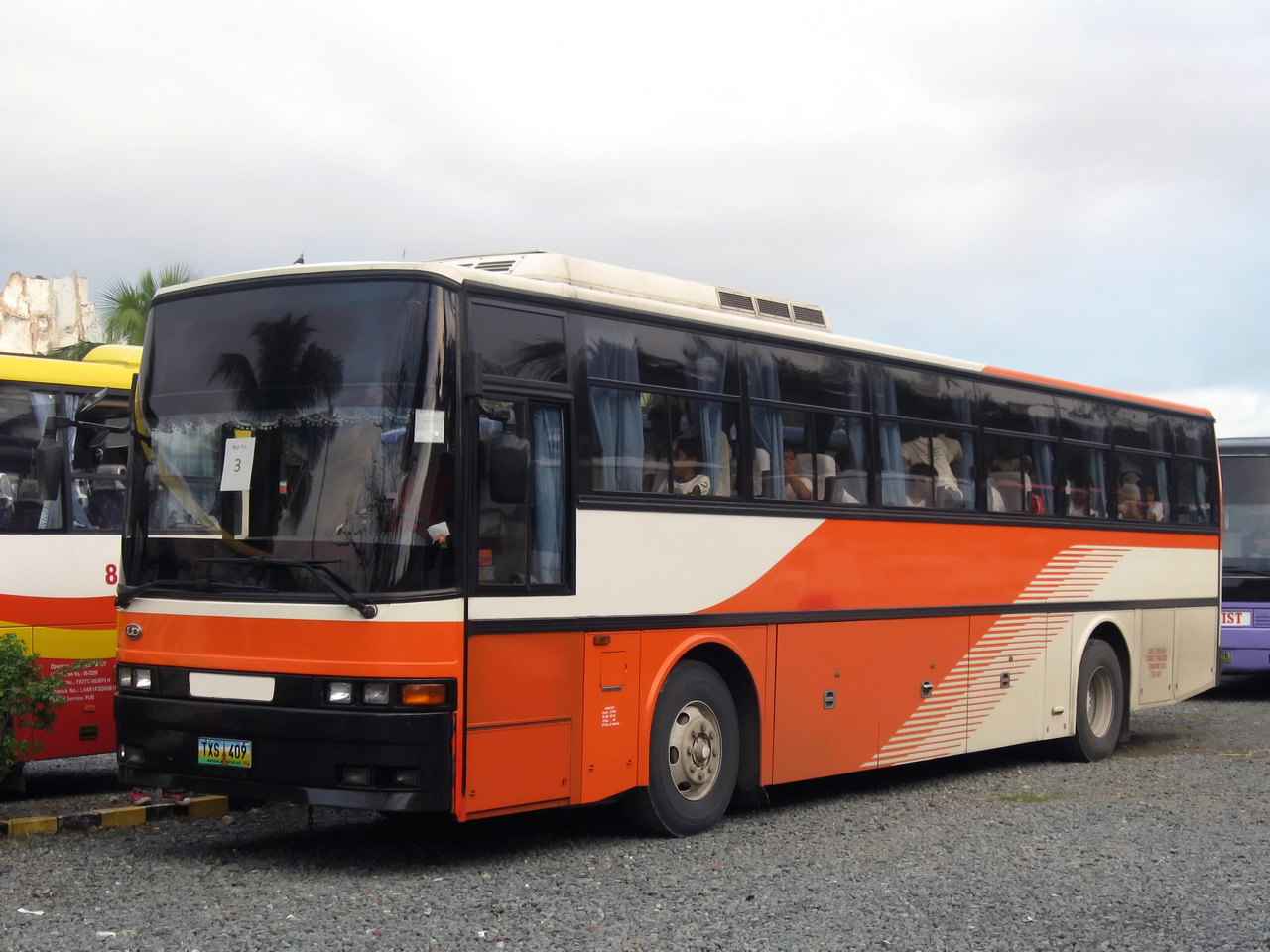
Space Arrow Euro Tour KC-JA530RAN

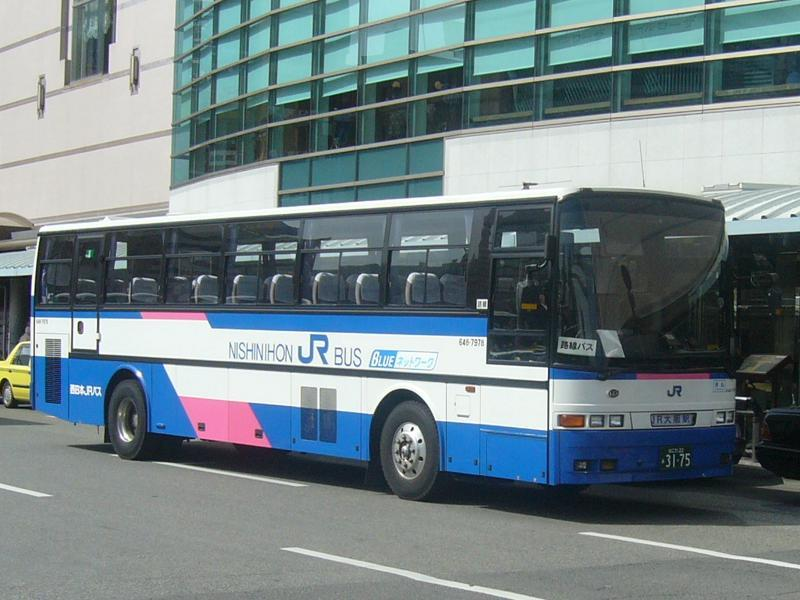
Space Arrow Euro Tour KC-JA520RAN

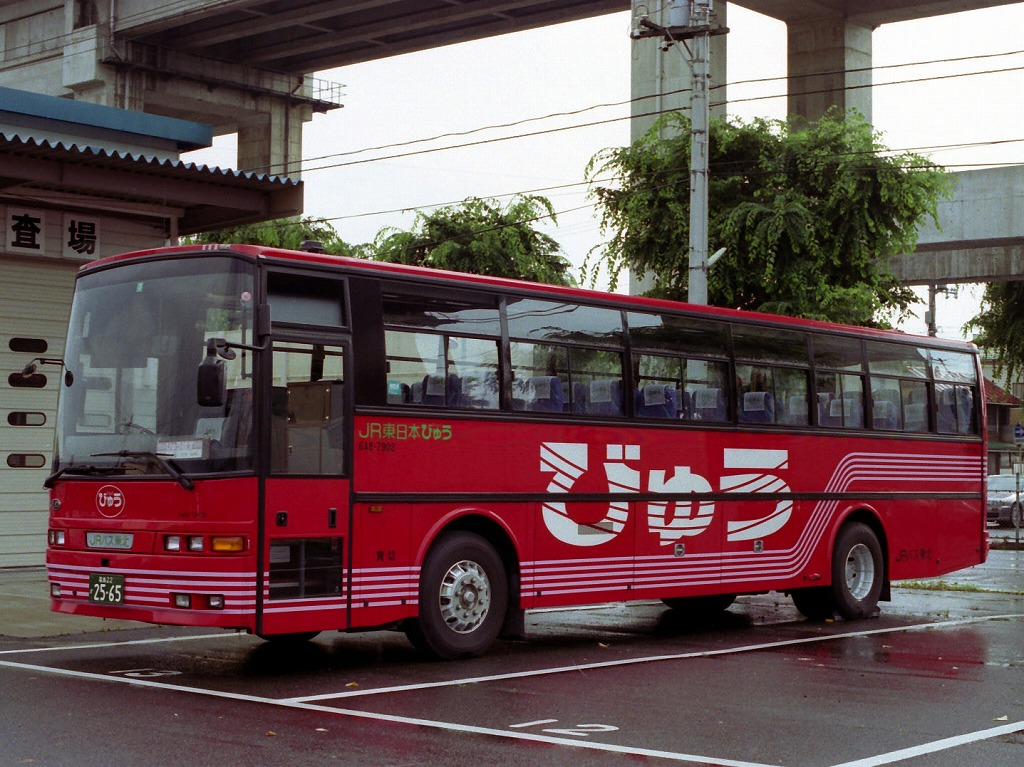
Space Arrow Euro Tour KC-JA520RAN

== Space Arrow A/Space Wing A ==
The Space Arrow A/Space Wing A is a rebadged Mitsubishi Fuso Aero Ace/Mitsubishi Fuso Aero Queen.

- BKG-AS96JP (2007)
- LKG-AS96VP (2010)
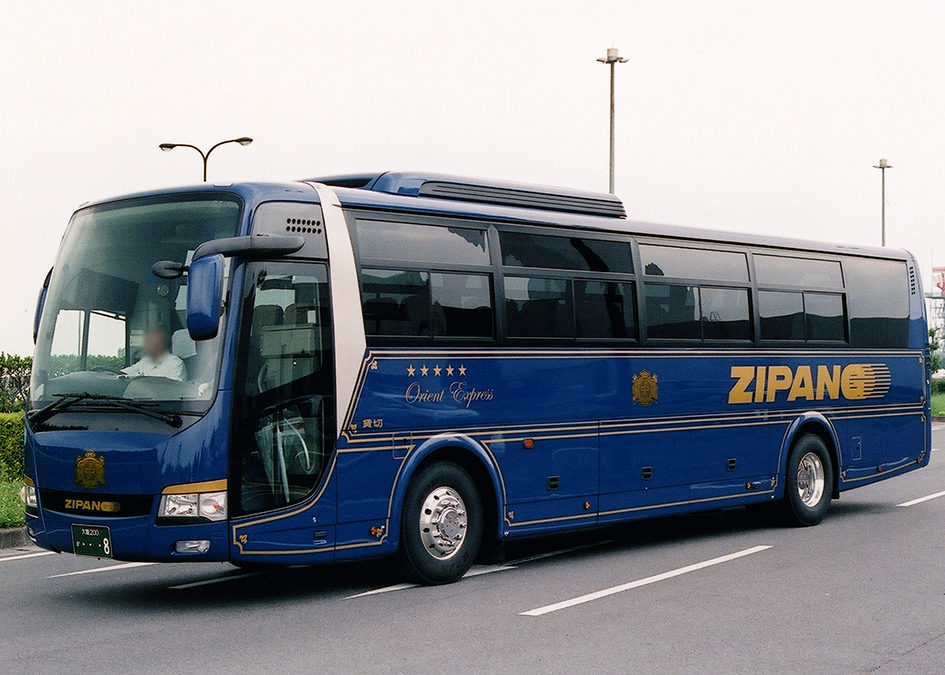
Space Arrow A BKG-AS96JP

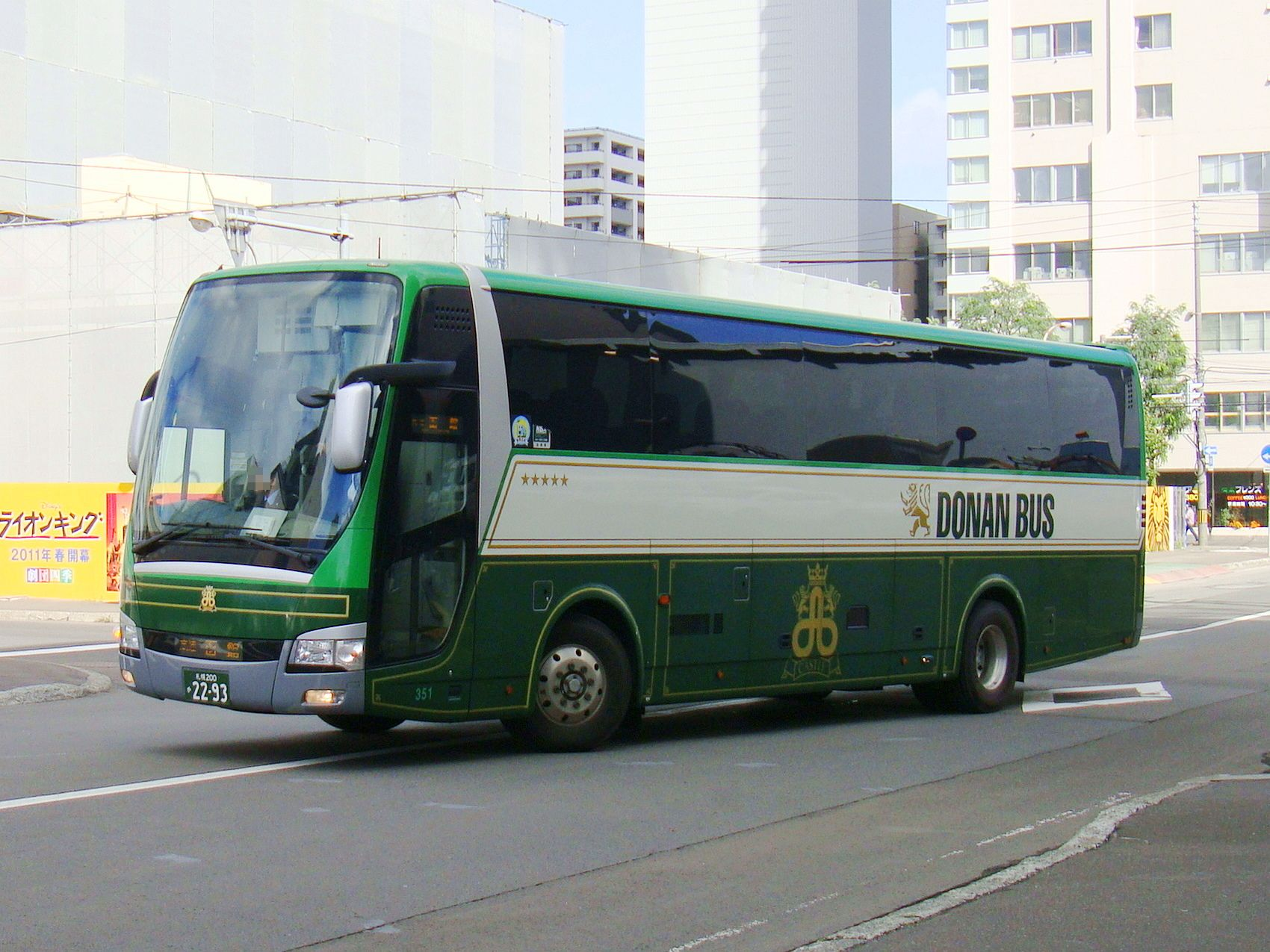
Space Wing A BKG-AS96JP

== Model lineup ==
- Hi-decker
  - Space Arrow 12m
- Super hi-decker
  - Space Wing 12m
  - Space Wing 3 axles 12m
