= Index of Windows games (X) =

This is an index of Microsoft Windows games.

This list has been split into multiple pages. Please use the Table of Contents to browse it.

Title	Released	Developer	Publisher
X Motor Racing	2007	Exotypos	Exotypos
X-Blades	2007	Gaijin Entertainment	SouthPeak Games
X-COM: Apocalypse	1997	Mythos Games	Microprose
XCOM: Enemy Unknown	2012	Firaxis Games	Take-Two Interactive Software
X-COM: Enforcer	2001	Infogrames	Infogrames
X-COM: Interceptor	1998	Microprose	Microprose
X-COM: Terror from the Deep	1999	MicroProse	2K Games
Xenon Racer	2019	3DClouds	Soedesco
The X-Files Game	1998	HyperBole Studios	Fox Interactive, Activision
X-Files: Unrestricted Access	2002	FOX Interactive	FOX Interactive
X-Men: The Official Game	2006	Z-Axis, Beenox, Amaze Entertainment, WayForward Technologies, Hypnos Entertainment	Activision
X-Men Legends II: Rise of Apocalypse	2005	Raven Software, Vicarious Visions, Beenox, Barking Lizards Technologies	Activision
X-Men Origins: Wolverine	2009	Raven Software	Activision
X: Beyond the Frontier	1999	Egosoft	THQ
X2: Wolverine's Revenge	2003	GenePool Software	Activision
X2: The Threat	2003	Egosoft	Deep Silver, Enlight
X3: Reunion	2005	Egosoft	Deep Silver, Enlight, Valve
X3: Terran Conflict	2008	Egosoft	Deep Silver, Interactive Gaming Software
Xconq	2000	Stan Shebs, Greg Fisher, Robert Forsman, et al.	
XIII	2003	Ubisoft Paris, Southend Interactive	Ubisoft, Feral Interactive
Xiama	2000	Mulawa Dreaming	Mulawa Dreaming
Xing: The Land Beyond	2017	John Torkington, Koriel Kruer, James Steininger	White Lotus Interactive, LLC
Xonotic	2010	Team Xonotic	Team Xonotic
Xpand Rally	2004	Techland	Techland, Micro Application
Xtreme Sports	2000	Innerloop Studios	Sega, Infogrames, Empire Interactive
