= X: Beyond the Frontier =

1999 space trading and combat video game

X: Beyond The Frontier
- Developer: Egosoft
- Publisher: THQ
- Directors: Darren Melbourne; Jürgen Goeldner
- Producer: Ole Mogensen
- Programmers: Martin Brenner; Bernd Lehahn
- Artist: Alexander Preuss
- Composer: Thomas Egeskov Petersen
- Series: X
- Engine: X TECH 1
- Platform: Windows
- Release: UK: October 1, 1999; NA: January 31, 2000
- Genre: Simulation
- Mode: Single-player

X: Beyond the Frontier is a video game created by Egosoft for Windows. The first of the X series, it is a space trading and combat simulator game, mostly set in the fictional X-Universe. Upon release, it was frequently compared to the older Elite.

An expansion, X-Tension, was released in 2000. Four full sequels have since followed: X2: The Threat in 2003, X3: Reunion in 2005, X3: Terran Conflict in 2008, and X4: Foundations in 2018. X: Beyond the Frontier and X-Tension were released together as X-Gold in 2000. A novel, Farnham's Legend, is based on the plot of X: Beyond the Frontier.

== Background ==
Set in the year 2912 AD, the player takes the role of Kyle Brennan, an Earth test pilot for the X-Shuttle, better known as the X-Perimental Shuttle, which has the ability to jump from one part of the universe to another via a wormhole without requiring a jumpgate.

During the test jump, something goes drastically wrong and Brennan ends up in an unknown part of space. He encounters an alien race, the Teladi, a highly capitalist, profit-focused culture. Finding Kyle helpless, they repair his ship and loan him some money. They also give hints on trading in the X Universe, and may tell him (if he asks) about the Argon and other alien races in the X-Universe. The X Universe is a network of sectors linked by jumpgates. With his jumpdrive destroyed, and no idea how to return to Earth, Brennan finds himself stranded, alone and indebted to an alien race.

The player is free to choose how to continue the game, and if or when to pursue the main plot.

== Main plot ==
Through trade and exploration, Brennan eventually encounters the Argon, a race who appear human. However, it quickly becomes clear that the Argon have no knowledge of Earth, and most dismiss Brennan as a crank when he claims to be from Earth.

He is subsequently led to a group of scientists and scholars known as the Goner, which is an organisation dedicated to preserving information about Earth. He works with them to discover the forgotten history of the Argon - that they are descended from humans who were cut off from Earth centuries ago in a war with rogue machines known as the Terraformers. After convincing the Argon that Earth is real, Brennan works with them - specifically, with Ban Danna, Head of the Argon Secret service - to prevent the Terraformers, now known as the Xenon, from developing a super-weapon.

Depending on his status with the different X-Universe races, Brennan finally forms an alliance to attack the Xenon forces and destroy their super-weapon, thus completing the game, but Kyle is stranded in the new sector of the Galaxy and is unable to return to Earth. The Argon federation welcome him into their ranks and offer him the means to make himself comfortable in his new home.

== Gameplay ==
There are fifty-four star systems in the X Universe, and within each one there are numerous installations. There is at least one space station in each system, and they range from ordinary factories like solar power plants to shipyards. By trading with them the player makes a profit, which allows one to upgrade the X-Perimental Shuttle with new weapons, better shields, and increased cargo space.

It is possible to trade within a single system, but the player can earn credits much quicker by exploring other systems via the jump gates. Eventually, the player will be able to buy factories and thus earn much greater income.

Although each system has at least one planet, it is not possible to land on any of them. Factories, space stations, and other installations are located far from the planets and stars.

== Reception ==
X: Beyond the Frontier

Aggregate score
Aggregator	Score
Metacritic	67/100

Review scores
Publication	Score
CNET Gamecenter	7/10
Computer Games Strategy Plus	3/5
Computer Gaming World	3.5/5
Eurogamer	3/10
Game Informer	6.5/10
GamePro	2.5/5
GameRevolution	D
GameSpot	8.1/10
GameSpy	68%
GameZone	6.5/10
IGN	7.7/10
PC Accelerator	7/10
PC Gamer (US)	70%

X: Beyond the Frontier received "average" reviews according to the review aggregation website Metacritic. Computer Games Strategy Plus gave it a mixed review over a month before it was released Stateside.

The game was praised for its open-ended gameplay and the large number of systems to explore. The economy in the X Universe is dynamic, with the price of goods varying with supply and demand. For example, selling a large amount of one particular product to a single station will result in the price for further consignments dropping in proportion to their demand.

The atmospheric musical score of the game was also praised, as was the varied dialogue one can have with many different aliens, although several reviews complained that the voice acting, while atmospheric, was hard to understand and could make it difficult to follow the plot.

The game was also praised highly for its "spectacular background graphics", such as "gorgeous colored lighting effects and the highly detailed rotating planets".

However, the game received criticism from some for giving the player so little equipment to start with. For example, the X-Perimental loses its weapons in the accident that brings it to the X Universe. These can be purchased once the player acquires sufficient credits to do so. Until then, the player is defenseless. The ship is also quite slow, and traveling between installations at first takes a long time. A time-accelerator device reduces the transit time, but it needs to be found and purchased, which means the game moves at a frustrating "snail's pace [for] the first 10-20 minutes". Still, "[a]fter as little as an hour of gameplay, with some shrewd trading... you should be able to outfit your X ship with a pair of lasers ... and the time-accelerating 'singularity time distortion engine'", said one review.

The combat system was lightly criticized as "being more of a goal to be overcome than a challenge to be relished", especially given the "suicidal as hell" "kamikaze" nature of enemy pilots, who appear constantly to wish to ram the player. A final criticism was the game's "skimpy manual", which leaves the player to work out most things for themselves. Others felt "the documentation was extremely well done" and that "the game actually uses your complete ignorance of what's going on around you to add a sense of adventure and mystery to the tale".

== X-Tension ==
X-Tension
- Developer: Egosoft
- Publishers: THQ; SouthPeak Games (EUR)
- Directors: Bernd Lehahn; Darren Melbourne
- Producer: Ole Mogensen
- Programmers: Martin Brenner; Bernd Lehahn; Thomas Maier; Marco Nowara
- Artist: Alexander Preuss
- Composer: Thomas Egeskov Petersen
- Series: X
- Engine: X TECH 1
- Platform: Windows
- Release: WW: June 1, 2000; WW: October 8, 2010 (Steam)
- Genre: Simulation
- Mode: Single-player

X-Tension (2000) was released as an expansion to Beyond the Frontier, but many gamers and reviewers consider it more a "sequel" than an "add-on". It follows on after the story in Beyond the Frontier, with "the evil Xenon vanquished" and the player "still stranded light years from home". The player once again takes on the role of Kyle Brennan, who now has "time to kill" as his X-perimental ship is reverse-engineered. The player is given a ship, some credits, and left to make his own way in the X Universe. In a canon aspect, the events of this game would be assumed to see the player start a business empire, which would become Terracorp in the sequel.

=== Gameplay ===
There is no overarching plot in X-Tension. It is an open-ended, sandbox game, filled with "microquests". The player is free to choose "to be a trader with an unarmed Argon Lifter... or a bounty-hunter ... armed to the teeth with plasma throwers"; free to choose "where [they] want to go, what to trade in and who to pick on". Egosoft's managing director, Bernd Lehahn, described X-Tension as a space game that allows the players to live freely in a virtual universe and do whatever they want to do.

=== Changes ===
The graphics were improved for X-Tension, adding new effects and scenery, and removing "visible seams which blighted many of these backdrops in the original game". The musical score was also extended, and the X Universe was expanded to a total of ninety systems.

X-Tension addressed many criticisms of the original game. The player's craft is pre-equipped with some upgrades - weapons and a time-accelerator - so that players can defend themselves from the beginning, although the weapons that the players start out with are useless against most of enemy ships. The player can leave the ship and space walk in a space suit, purchase new ships from shipyards, and even capture enemy ships that can be flown by the player.

The in-game interface was expanded to include new features, including an automatic navigation system that allows the player "to easily access information about any sectors" visited, and includes a full map of the galaxy showing everywhere the players have been. When combined with some upgrades and equipment, this system allows the player to monitor the X-Universe's economy, traffic and prices remotely, a new feature which makes trading less difficult than it was in the original game. The interface also allows the players to control many of their assets - factories and ship tasks - remotely. They no longer need to land at a factory to adjust it, nor even to be in same region of space.

One criticism shared by both games was the combat system; while improved in X-Tension, it could still be summed up as "unremarkable". Notably, Egosoft's managing director, Bernd Lehahn, mentioned appealing to the Wing Commander audience as a high priority in the design of 2005 sequel X^{3}: Reunion. He defined this as "people who... expect a story and cool fighting missions" but who may be won over to "the freeform gameplay and the advantages that a realistic economy adds to such a game".

=== Reception ===
X-Tension

Review scores
Publication	Score
Eurogamer	8/10
PC Zone	83%

The extension pack received "favorable" reviews, although no aggregate score exists.

== See also ==
- List of PC games
