= X Rebirth =

2013 space trading and combat video game

- Steam cover art
- Developer: Egosoft
- Publisher: Egosoft
- Director: Bernd Lehahn
- Producer: Peter "Kulan" Kullgard
- Programmer: Chris Burtt-Jones
- Artist: Alexander Preuss
- Writer: Helge Kautz
- Composer: Alexei Zakharov
- Series: X
- Platforms: Linux, macOS, Microsoft Windows
- Release: WW: November 15, 2013
- Genre: Space trading and combat simulator
- Mode: Single-player

X Rebirth is a single-player space trading and combat game developed by Egosoft, published by Deep Silver (Europe) and Tri Synergy (America). It is the sixth installment in the X universe adventure video game series, following X3: Albion Prelude (2012). The game runs on Linux, macOS and Microsoft Windows. Egosoft director Bernd Lehahn has stated that X Rebirth will not be available on consoles.

== Gameplay ==
X Rebirth incorporates open-ended (or "sandbox") gameplay. Like previous installments in the series, the game is set in a dynamic universe that continues to evolve even when the player is not present, with activities such as simulated trade, combat, piracy, and more. Players can participate in these activities or others to gain notoriety and wealth, and may even construct their own space installations and command starships, effectively establishing a personal empire that can dynamically and significantly influence the game world.

Prior to launch, the developers announced that X Rebirth would feature a new interface design, intended to reduce the initial complexity for new players, but they asserted that the game mechanics would remain comparable in complexity to those found in previous X series titles. After the game's release, many people attacked a lot of the design decisions made by Egosoft, and a number of customers requested refunds.

The first version (build 0) was released for Linux in March 2015.

== Synopsis ==
Its story shows a more focused effort on specific characters than Egosoft's previous 'X' efforts:

"In the distant future, the X universe faces a period of profound and irrevocable change. While the universe stumbles towards an uncertain future, countless adventures await as new enemies rise in search of power. Enter a young adventurer and his unlikely female ally traveling in an old, battered ship with a glorious past - two people alone against the galaxy, playing a key part in the events to come".

== Reception ==
Reception

Aggregate score
Aggregator	Score
Metacritic	33/100

Review scores
Publication	Score
GameSpot	2/10
IGN	4.3/10
GameFront	47/100
GameStar	62/100
PC Games	39%

The game has been received negatively by critics, holding the score of 33/100 on Metacritic, indicating "generally unfavorable reviews".

By March 2014, X Rebirth has received 25 patches since release, although the game is widely regarded as being a disappointment following from previous successes in the series. In the following month, X Rebirth 2.0 became available, delivering a number of patch fixes and gameplay improvements.

Egosoft released the first downloadable content (DLC) for X Rebirth on 11 December entitled The Teladi Outpost including a host of fixes and improvements to the base game. This update, delivered exclusively for the 64 bit platform, brought the release to version 3.0. The Teladi Outpost DLC features a new system containing two sectors. On the days surrounding and during the weeks following the update, Egosoft delivered a number of video tutorials to YouTube covering many common facets of gameplay.

== See also ==
- List of PC games
