= X4: Foundations =

2018 space trading and combat video game

- Steam cover art
- Developer: Egosoft
- Publisher: Egosoft
- Director: Bernd Lehahn
- Producer: Peter "Kulan" Kullgard
- Programmers: Chris Burtt-Jones; Roger Boerdijk
- Artist: Lino Thomas
- Writer: Helge Kautz
- Composer: Alexei Zakharov
- Series: X
- Engine: X TECH 5
- Platforms: Microsoft Windows, Linux
- Release: WW: 30 November 2018
- Genre: Space trading and combat simulator
- Mode: Single-player

X4: Foundations is a space trading and combat game developed by Egosoft and published in 2018. It is the seventh and most recent installment in the X series, following X Rebirth (2013). The game runs on Linux and Microsoft Windows.

== Gameplay ==
Similar to previous titles in the X game series, X4: Foundations incorporates nonlinear gameplay. There are various types of game scenarios that affects which ship the player will start with. The game takes place in a universe that is active even when the player is not present, involving simulated trade, combat, piracy, and other features. The player as an individual may take part in these or other actions to gain notoriety or wealth, going so far as to be able to construct their own space installations and command fleets of starships, establishing what amounts to their own personal empire and dynamically and drastically altering the game's world in the process.

== Reception ==
Reception

Aggregate score
Aggregator	Score
Metacritic	59/100

Review scores
Publication	Score
Destructoid	7.5/10
GameRevolution	4/5

At launch, the game has had an indifferent critical reception according to Metacritic, indicating "mixed or average reviews". Critics consistently noted the title was a significant improvement over its predecessor, X Rebirth.
