= Magnetic (disambiguation) =

The term magnetic usually refers to magnetism.

Magnetic may also refer to:

== Entertainment ==
=== Albums ===
- Magnetic (Steps Ahead album), 1986
- Magnetic (Goo Goo Dolls album), 2013
- Magnetic (Terence Blanchard album) or the title song, 2013
- Magnetic (Kaela Kimura album), 2022

=== Songs ===
- "Magnetic" (Earth, Wind & Fire song), 1983
- "Magnetic" (Kaela Kimura song), 2022
- "Magnetic" (Illit song), 2024
- "Magnetic" (Wage War song), 2024
- "Magnetic" (The Bausa song), 2026
- "Magnetic", by Chlöe Howl, 2017

=== Other media ===
- Magnetic (film), a 2015 science-fiction film
- "Magnetic" (Smallville), a television episode
- Magnetic (video game), a 2003 adventure game

== Other ==
- Magnetic Island, off the coast of Townsville, Queensland, Australia
- HMAS Magnetic, a former Royal Australian Navy base at Townsville, Queensland, Australia
- SS Magnetic, a passenger tender of the White Star Line
