= Vega Strike =

2005 video game

- Developer: The Vega Strike Team
- Platforms: FreeBSD, Linux, Microsoft Windows, OS X, IRIX
- Genre: Space simulation
- Modes: Single-player, multiplayer

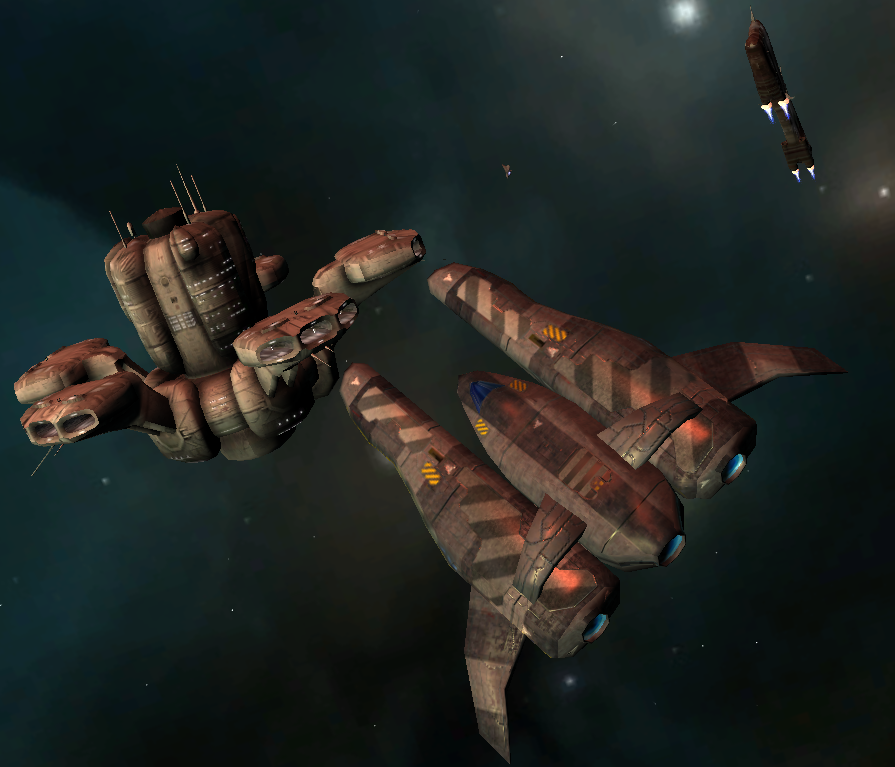
Screenshot of Vega Strike: The hull of a "Llama" demonstrates the normal mapping capabilities of VS (2008).

Vega Strike is a first-person space trading and combat simulator, developed for Microsoft Windows, Linux, FreeBSD and OS X systems. Many of the core game mechanics of Vega Strike are indirectly inspired by Elite. Other games, such as Wing Commander: Privateer, influenced the original developer.

== Development ==
Vega Strike is programmed in C/C++ over the OpenGL 3D graphics API and performs internal scripting written in Python and XML. Released under the GNU General Public License, Vega Strike is free and open source software.

An unofficial remake of Wing Commander: Privateer entitled Wing Commander: Privateer - Gemini Gold was made using the Vega Strike engine.

== Gameplay ==
Vega Strike aims to insert players into a large, dynamic universe with diverse factions of varying disposition to the player and to each other, and an economy model where trade, combat and exploration are all profitable. Financial gains allow players to buy upgrades and/or better vehicles, enabling them to advance into more dangerous and profitable missions. The player can have varying levels of relations with factions. Negative relations can form if the player destroys some of a given faction's ships. Positive relations can be formed if the player destroys ships that are part of an enemy to a given faction. Players can either buy and sell cargo, or accept missions from the Mission Computer, as well as talk to people in the bar at the space station/planet. In the tradition of some precursor games, individuals of significant plot importance are often found in bars.

The existence of a universal currency, open markets, trading items of value to all or most groups, and widespread technologies allows the player to do business practically everywhere and buy from anyone. There is also a campaign in the game which assigns certain missions for the player, following various paths within a story-graph. The player can continue playing the game after the campaign is finished.

=== Transportation ===
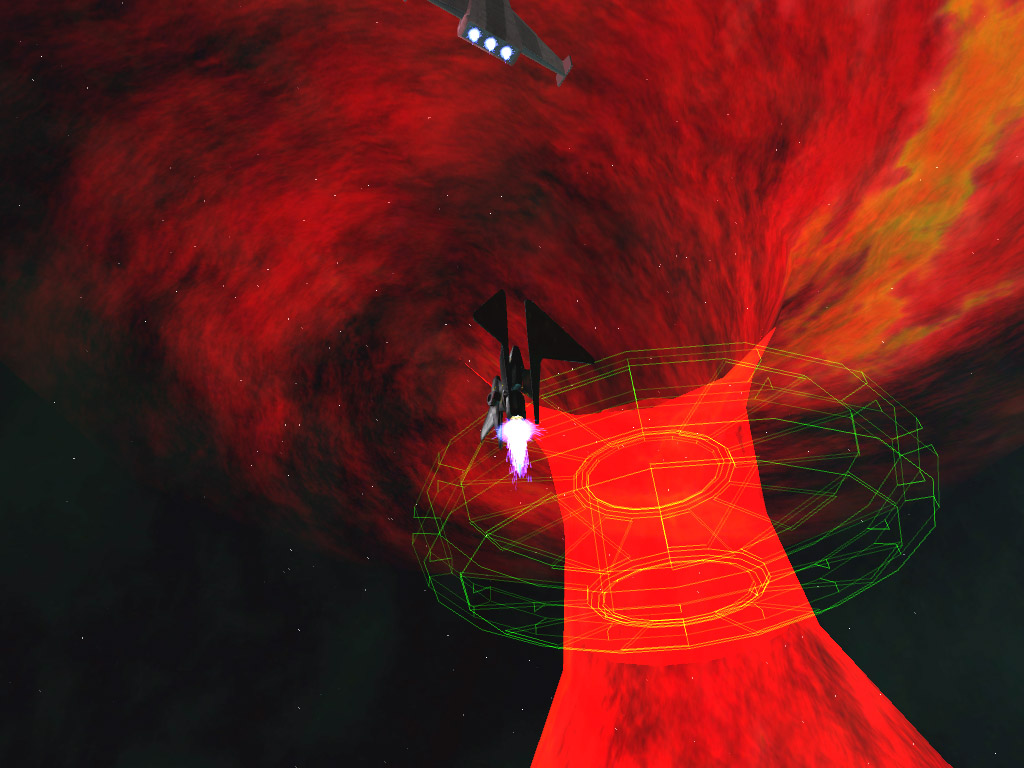
Ships flying near an activated jump point

To travel quickly to and from different planets/space stations in the same system, the SPEC system is used. It multiplies the engine speed of the player's spacecraft, causing the ship to reach high speeds, allowing for quick travel to different locations in a solar system. However, the number of times it multiplies the engine speed is limited by gravity: the closer the player's ship is to a planet/space station, the less the speed is multiplied. After the player waits, and gets further away from the gravity of the planet/station, the SPEC drive will "ramp up", and the ship will stretch and star streaks will appear, until the spacecraft slows down due to gravity, or the player deactivates the SPEC drive.

To travel to different star systems, the player must obtain a jump drive and then to go to weak points in space known as jump points. When the ship is close enough to the jump point, the player can activate the jump drive and "jump" to another solar system in a few seconds. In typical solar systems, there is an assortment of jump points, each point leading to another system. The player may have to go through multiple systems/jump points to get to the destination system. For missions that span across multiple systems, the instructions for which jump points to go to are displayed on the HUD, but if the player wants to reach an area regardless of any missions, the navigation computer can be used to plot the correct course.

=== Mission types ===
- Cargo: Transportation of items of the most diverse kinds, ranging from foodstuffs to political prisoners—a dangerous trade, as authorities will detect illegal cargo and pirates will attempt to pry it off unsuspecting haulers.
- Bounty: Players are advised to be careful in their choice of targets, as every faction has their own friends and enemies.
- Patrol: A number of targets within a system must be scanned in detail by visiting each in turn.
- Clean Sweep: Similar to patrol, but any hostiles encountered on the way must be eliminated.
- Defense: A target in the system is being attacked by enemy forces. The player must eliminate the attacking forces and keep the target from being destroyed. The target can range from a small merchant ship being attacked by some light forces, to a space station being destroyed by a large, well planned attack force.
- Rescue: The player must rescue a downed pilot, and will be rewarded with credits. The player must proceed to a location, move the pilot's escape pod in and carry him to a destination planet. The escape pod is usually in a battle zone, and the player is warned to exercise caution in these missions.

=== Upgrades ===
Vega Strike includes a variety of upgrades for the player's ship. The player may use earned money to buy upgrades to improve the spacecraft's performance. Upgrades include repair systems such as the Repair Droids, Reactors for the player's ship, energy shields and hull upgrades, weapons such as lasers and missiles, maneuverability enhancers (like mult jet turn enhancers which increase the ship’s turning rate), and miscellaneous upgrades such as adding extra cargo space, fuel, cloaking devices (that make the ship invisible visually and undetectable by radar/sensors) and ECM systems (anti-missile countermeasures). Every spacecraft can only carry a limited amount of upgrades, as they all have a maximum upgrade capacity.

=== Spacecraft ===
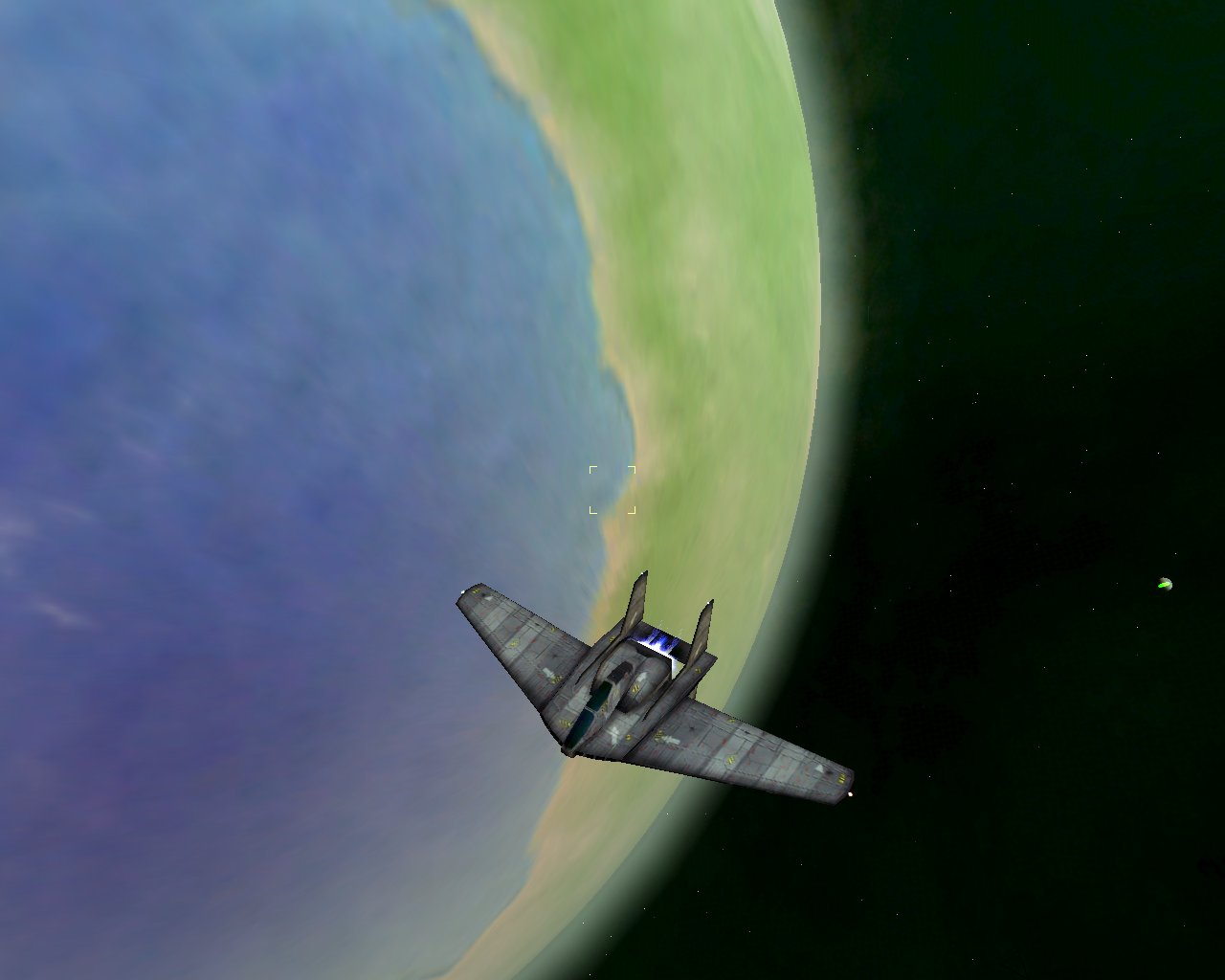
An Ancestor-class fighter cruising around a bio-diverse planet (2005)

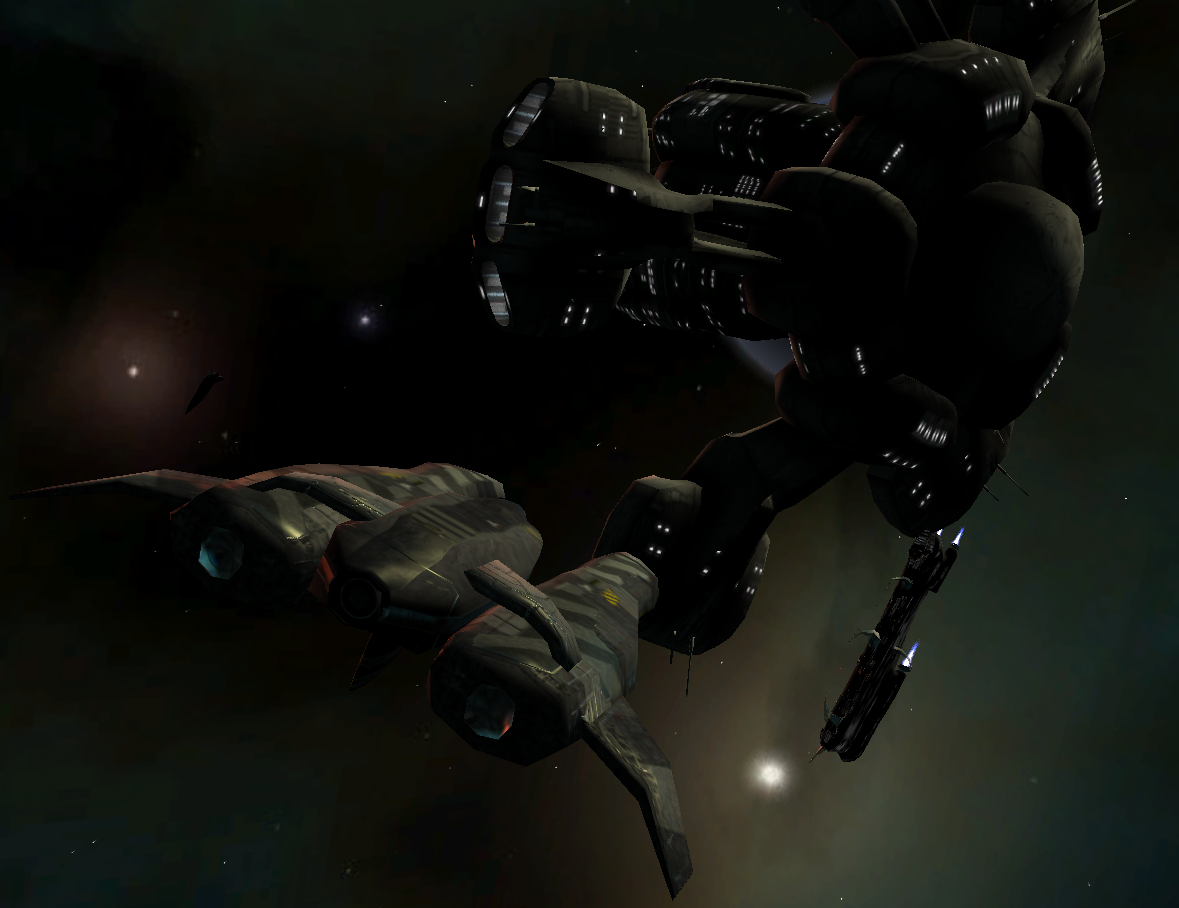
Llama-class ship docks on mining station (2008)

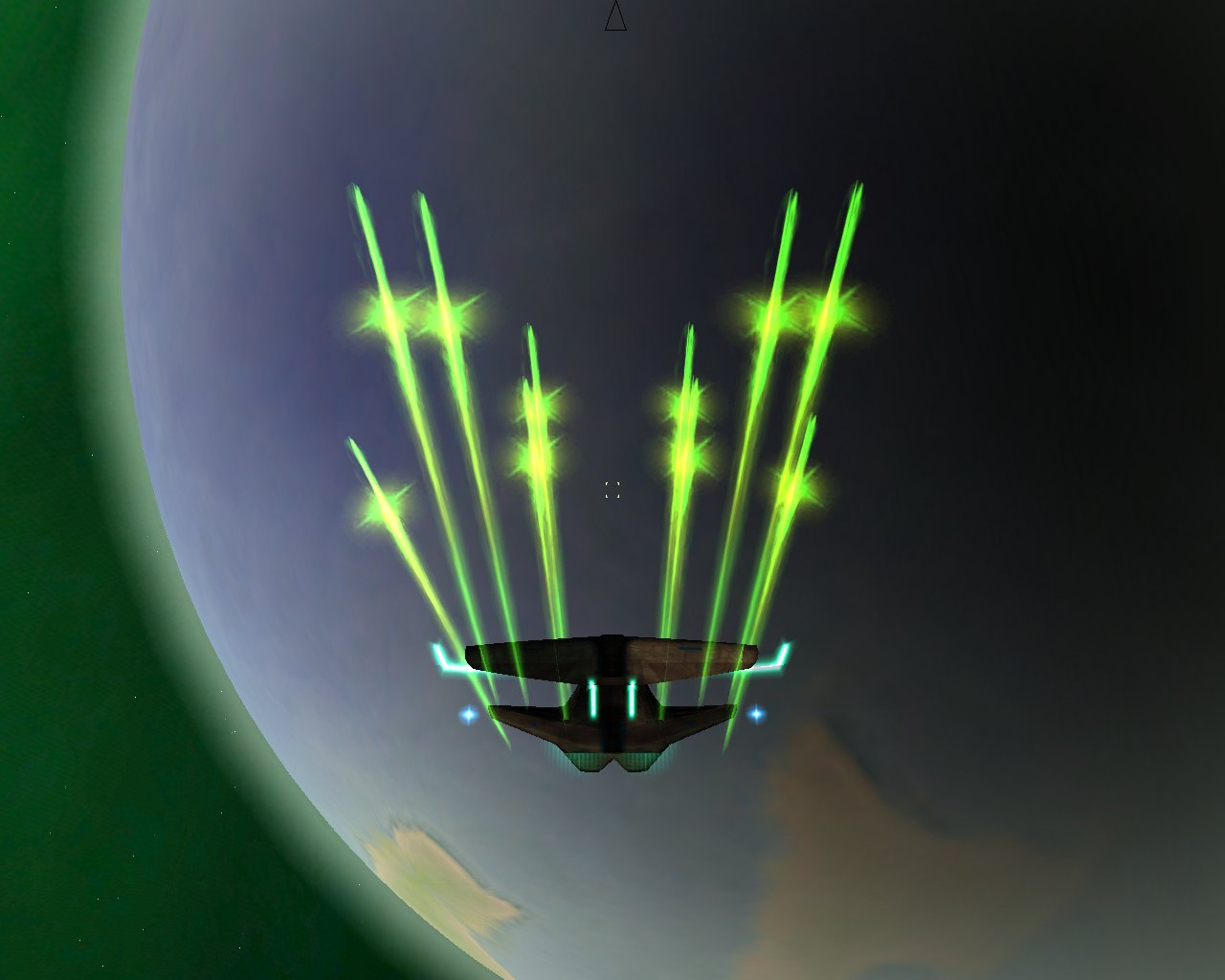
Lazer rain

Vega Strike contains a wide array of spacecraft that are sold by each race, and by various factions within each race. Vessels vary in purpose from multipurpose civilian craft such as the Plowshare medium-size cargo shuttle to high-performance fighter/assault craft like the Ariston. Cargo haulers, bombers, and even capital ships are at the player's disposal. The player starts with the Llama class light cargo shuttle, along with some basic upgrades, and later has the option to buy multiple ships.

== Reception ==
In 2005, an O'Reilly article on "Open Source Mac Gaming" recommended Vega Strike. In 2008 a Full Circle magazine review named Vega Strike among a list of "Top 5 space games".

== See also ==
- Pioneer
- List of open source games
- List of space flight simulation games
