= Wing Commander: Privateer =

1993 video game

- Developer: Origin Systems
- Publisher: Electronic Arts
- Producer: R. Scott Russo
- Designer: Joel Manners
- Programmer: Ed Maurer
- Composer: Nenad Vugrinec
- Series: Wing Commander
- Platform: DOS
- Release: September 1993 (floppy); 1994 (CD-ROM)
- Genre: Space trading and combat simulator
- Mode: Single-player

Wing Commander: Privateer is an adventure space trading and combat simulator computer video game which was released by Origin Systems in September 1993. Privateer and its storyline is part of the Wing Commander series. The player takes the role of Grayson Burrows, a "privateer" who travels through the Gemini Sector, one of many sectors in the Wing Commander universe. Unlike Wing Commander, the player is no longer a navy pilot, but a freelancer who can choose to be a pirate, a merchant, a mercenary or any of the above in some combination. The player may follow the built-in plot, but is free to adventure on his own, even after the plot has been completed.

Privateer had two add-ons titled Speech Pack (1993) and Righteous Fire (1994). A sequel was released in 1996, titled Privateer 2: The Darkening. The game was re-released in 2011 with Windows support on GOG.com, with MacOS support added in 2012.

== Gameplay ==
Basic gameplay consists of flying and fighting with the ship in a star system, jumping from system to system via jump points, landing on bases or planets, interacting with people (mainly talking) and buying or selling equipment or commodities. The Gemini sector is divided into quadrants, each containing several star systems, most of them with planets or bases that may be visited. Unlike other games in the series, the gameplay is primarily in the sandbox style of play.

Centurion cockpit view during combat with Talon fighter

When flying, the main view is a first-person look from inside the cockpit at the screens (HUDs) and the space before the ship. Space combat simulation is similar to the style of other Wing Commander games of its time. On planets and bases, a static overview/first-person-view is used to show the rooms and interact with people. Menus are used for buying, selling, or taking missions from the mission computer.

The Gemini sector is frequented by seven factions: merchants, bounty hunters, retros, pirates, militia, the Terran Confederation and the Kilrathi. Some of them attack on sight, while others are allies of the player. How the members of the factions react is not only preset, but depends also on the player's actions.

The player may conduct business as a merchant or fight in combat for non-plot missions provided by the above factions. If playing as a merchant, the player must make a profit from price differences of commodities on different planets or stations. Alternatively, the player may choose from randomly generated non-plot missions from a mission computer. Successful completion of missions results in monetary award, which allows better ship weapons and equipment to be purchased.

During the plot, the player meets fixers, often representing one of the above factions, who assign missions of their interest in exchange for money or information. The missions usually consist of plain combat, escorting ships while battling enemies or commodity delivery including smuggling while fighting or escaping enemies. The plot itself can only be played straight, one mission after another in a preset line. The player can choose to pursue other goals between plot missions or even while on a mission.

Privateer features a pseudo-3D world in plain raster graphics at 320×200 with 256 colors (VGA).

== Plot ==
The game begins with a mysterious drone attacking ships in the system. When Burrows lands on the planet New Detroit, a man named Sandoval hires him and gives him a mysterious artifact. On his return, Burrows finds the man is dead. Burrows seeks information about the artifact, eventually meeting Dr. Monkhouse, a xenoarchaeologist on Palan.

Monkhouse tells Burrows the artifact was made by an ancient technologically advanced race, the Steltek. The artifact is half of a map; Monkhouse has the rest. Burrows agrees to explore the area in the map.

Burrows finds a powerful weapon on an ancient ship and mounts it on his own. When he leaves, a mysterious drone follows him, destroying everything it encounters. Burrows is asked by the Confederation to lure the drone into an ambush, so it can be destroyed.

Burrows then encounters a Steltek scout, looking for the last traces of their technology in order to remove them. The scout energizes the ancient weapon in exchange for the location of the ship where Burrows found it. It then remains for Burrows to destroy the dangerous drone.

In the Righteous Fire expansion, the Steltek weapon is stolen from his ship while Burrows is docked. He travels to Oxford, where he meets someone who helps him in return for flying missions against the Retros, a homicidal band of religious extremists led by a man named Mordecai Jones. The informant adds that Governor Menesch, who sells weapons and ships to the Retros and pirates, was probably behind the theft of Burrows’ weapon.

A Retro defector tells Burrows the location of the Retros’ headquarters and warns they have made copies of the Steltek gun. Burrows realizes he must defeat the Retro leader Jones and destroy all copies of the powerful weapon.

Burrows' name was unknown to the general public for many years. During that period he was known as "Brownhair", by reference to "Bluehair", the Wing Commander I and II protagonist later known as Christopher Blair. In the CD-ROM edition which uses full speech, the characters always refer to him as "Captain" or "Privateer"; many people assume "Privateer" is his callsign.

== Expansions ==
Two expansion packs were released for Privateer: the Speech Pack (1993), which added digitized speech voice-overs to inflight communications with other Pilots and enemies; and Righteous Fire (1994), which continues the story and adds other purchasable equipment to the game. Righteous Fire differs from the original Privateer in that there is no way to "lose" by failing a mission. If the player does not successfully complete a mission, he is offered the chance to try again.

In 1994, a CD-ROM edition was released that included the Righteous Fire expansion and full speech throughout the game, more than what the Speech Pack alone provides. The actor voicing the main character also changes between the Speech Pack and CD-ROM edition of the game.

== Sequel ==
Another Privateer game, Privateer 2: The Darkening, was released in December 1996, helmed by Erin Roberts, the brother of Chris Roberts. However, The Darkening is not a storyline sequel, but a spin-off. The Darkening is set a century after the original Privateer and in a different region of space. This setting and the storyline of The Darkening is self-contained, never being mentioned in any other Wing Commander game. Privateer 2 uses live action sequences featuring such talents as Clive Owen, Mathilda May, Jürgen Prochnow, John Hurt, David Warner and Christopher Walken. After Electronic Arts shut down Origin, Chris Roberts created the game Freelancer which featured similar art and story to Privateer, but was set in a new universe.

A television series based on Privateer was planned to debut sometime in 1997.

An unofficial fan remake entitled Wing Commander: Privateer - Gemini Gold was made using the Vega Strike engine and released in 2005.

OpenPrivateer was released in 2026 as a source port for modern operating systems with modding and multiplayer support.

== Reception ==
Reception

Review scores
Publication	Score
Computer Gaming World	3.5/5
Hyper	Righteous Fire: 82/100

Privateer was very popular, appearing in second place in PC Data's list of best-selling DOS games for September 1993, and first place in Computer Gaming World's "Playing Lately?" reader survey for November 1993. The magazine in 1993 enjoyed the game's less-structured storyline with Ultima-like "real moral choices", but criticized the "sophomoric" writing. Computer Gaming World recommended the "deluxe, high-end product" to those with "486 machines sporting fast video cards and vast hard drives". A 1994 survey of strategic space games set in the year 2000 and later gave the game three-plus stars out of five, calling it a "pretty exciting game", but criticizing "an unusual number of incompatibilities with sound cards and joysticks, even for such a complex product". The magazine in May 1994 approved of Righteous Fire's "fun" storyline—as open-ended as Privateer while adding "new ship elements"—and its tight continuity with the original game. Despite reporting a "lack of challenge" for experienced players, the magazine recommended the expansion to "privateers who just can't get enough of life on the edge of the Wing Commander universe".

James V. Trunzo reviewed Privateer in White Wolf #41 (March, 1994), giving it a final evaluation of "Very Good" and stated that "There are plots within plots, but Privateer is as close as you'll get to a true roleplaying experience. Visit the seamy side of the Wing Commander universe - and make your own rules."

James V. Trunzo reviewed Privateer CD in White Wolf #49 (Nov., 1994), rating it a 4 out of 5 and stated that "The fact that Privateer CD takes up only 2 MBs of HD space (versus 24 MBs for a complete disk install) is a major bonus. The CD also includes the Speech Pack and Righteous Fire (a 24-mission add-on). The game's price and convenience of playing off the CD make this a superior package."

Privateer was a runner-up for Computer Gaming World's Action Game of the Year award in June 1994, losing to Prince of Persia 2: The Shadow and the Flame. The editors wrote that Privateer "advanced the graphic look of the series somewhat and introduced a free-wheeling open-endedness for the players who chose not to follow the storyline".
