= Abenteuer Europa =

1994 video game

- Developer: Ego Software
- Publisher: Social Democratic Party of Germany
- Platform: DOS
- Release: 1994
- Genres: Point and click adventure

Abenteuer Europa (German for Adventure Europe) is a 1994 German video game developed by Ego Software and published by the Social Democratic Party of Germany (SPD) for DOS.

The SPD had the point-and-click adventure produced in the run-up to the 1994 European Parliament elections in order to reach younger voters. 40,000 copies of the game were originally produced. The SPD ended up winning 40 of the 99 German seats in the European Parliament.
