= Pioneer (video game) =

Open-source space adventure game

- Release: 2006; 20 years ago
- Stable release: release 20260907 / September 7, 2026; 0 days ago
- Platform: Linux, Microsoft Windows
- Type: Single player, space trading and combat simulator
- License: GPL (and more permissive licenses) / CC BY-SA 3.0
- Website: pioneerspacesim.net
- Repository: https://github.com/pioneerspacesim/pioneer

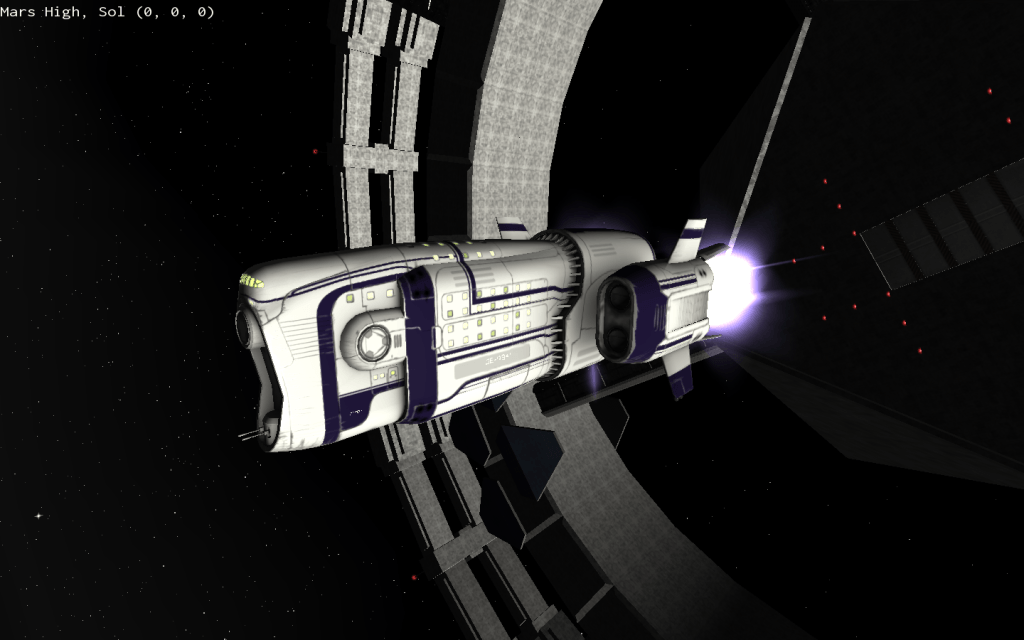
Screenshot

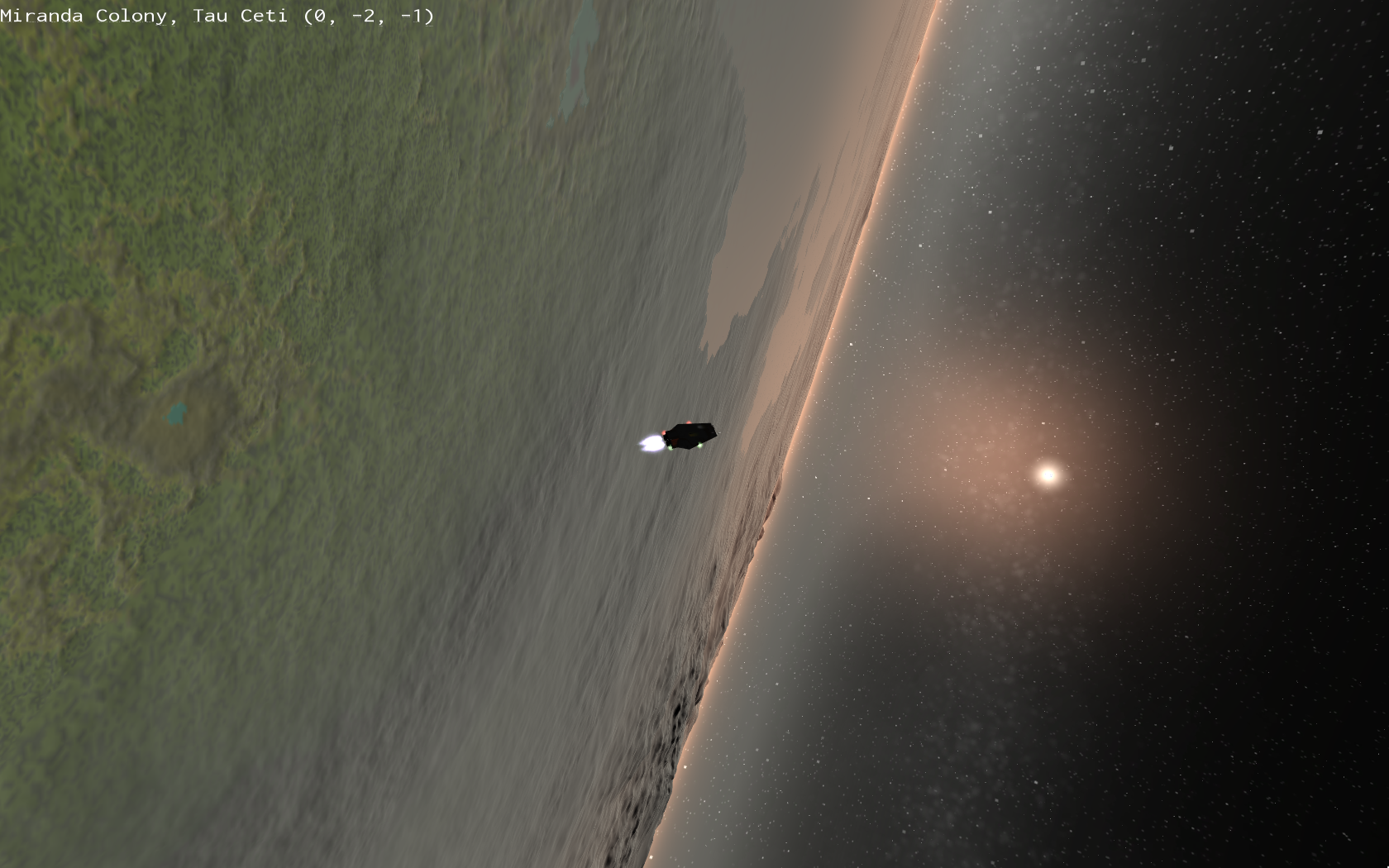
Landing on Miranda Colony

Pioneer is a free and open source space trading and combat simulator video game inspired by the commercial proprietary Frontier: Elite 2. It is available for Linux, and Microsoft Windows.

== Setting ==
Pioneer is set at the start of the 33rd century. The player may choose from one of three starting locations: Mars, New Hope or a space station around Barnard's Star.

== Gameplay ==
The game has no set objective, and the player is free to explore the galaxy and accrue money by performing tasks like trading, piracy or combat missions, allowing them to achieve a higher rank, buy better ships and equipment and hire more crew.

It has a realistic flight and orbital model based on Newtonian physics and a rudimentary atmospheric model with drag and heat build-up.

== Development ==
Development was started in 2008 by Tom Morton, also known for his work on GLFrontier, as a remake and homage to Frontier: Elite 2. The game is written in C++ and uses OpenGL for graphical rendering. It uses Lua for scripting support. The development migrated in 2011 to a SourceForge.net repository, and some years later to GitHub.

The project had at times up to 50 developers.

== Reception and impact ==
Pioneer was selected in March 2013 as "HotPick" by Linux Format. Pioneer was used in a physical spaceship flight simulator project in 2013. In 2014 Pioneer was described by PCGamer as "incredibly slick" and named among the "ten top fan remade classics you can play for free right now". In 2015 a Der Standard article noted the enormous work the fans have achieved with Pioneer as Elite remake and continuation.

Pioneer became a quite popular open source freeware title; between 2011 and May 2017, the game was downloaded via SourceForge.net over 260,000 times.

== See also ==
- Vega Strike
- List of open source games
- List of space flight simulation games
