= X2: The Threat =

2003 space trading and combat video game

- Developers: Egosoft; Virtual Programming (OS X)
- Publishers: EU: Deep Silver; NA: Enlight; Virtual Programming (OS X) (Note: Mac version distributed by Freeverse Inc. in North America.); Linux Game Publishing (Linux)
- Director: Bernd Lehahn
- Producer: Darren Astles
- Programmers: Thomas Maier; Klaus Meyer; Martin Brenner; Bernd Lehahn
- Artists: Markus Pohl; Alexander Preuss
- Writers: Helge Kautz; Thomas Maier
- Composers: Thomas Egeskov Petersen; Alexei Zakharov
- Series: X
- Platforms: Windows, Mac OS X, Linux
- Release: Windows: NA: December 1, 2003; PAL: February 6, 2004; Mac OS X: WW: May 31, 2005
- Genre: Space simulation
- Mode: Single-player

X2: The Threat is a space simulation video game developed by Egosoft for Windows, Linux, and Mac OS X. It is part of the X series. It was released in 2003 and is a sequel to X: Beyond the Frontier. Freeverse Software ported the game to Mac OS X in 2004/2005, while Linux Game Publishing produced their Linux port in 2005/2006. An expansion pack, X2: The Return, was cancelled.

The sequel to this game is X3: Reunion (2005).

== Gameplay ==
The player's first ship is an Argon Discoverer.

As with the originals, X2: The Threat is a space trading and combat simulator set in the fictional X-Universe, a network of sectors, linked by large space gates. The game features a new graphics engine, a much expanded Universe and 60 different flyable ships, along with a number of new missions available to the player. Unlike the expansion pack, X-Tension, which was almost entirely open-ended, X2: The Threat has a clear background story involving an aggressive alien race known as the Khaak, but the game remains open-ended and the players are free to pursue the plot at their own pace, if at all.

=== Plot ===
The player takes the role of Julian Gardna, a pirate and thief in the year 2933, twenty-one years after the events of the original. Early on, the Khaak, a hostile alien race, emerge to threaten the X-Universe. The player is asked to undertake a series of missions to uncover their origins, their intentions, and to determine their connection to his missing father. Ultimately, Julian must fight off a massive attack by Khaak, rescuing numerous other characters in the process. Key non-player characters include:

- Bret Serra: rogue, pirate and Julian's closest friend.
- Ban Danna: the head of Argon Secret Service who shares a close relationship with Julian's father dating back to the previous game, X: Beyond the Frontier.
- Elena Kho, Chief Executive in the influential Terracorp corporation.
- Saya Kho, daughter of Elena Kho.
- Kyle Brennan, Julian's father, founder of Terracorp, and protagonist from the previous games.

Due to the expense of completing the plot, the players are periodically prompted to break away from the plot and increase their resources through trade and other open-ended play.

=== Open ended features ===
An Argon Centaur patrols Argon Prime.

X2 is set within the X-Universe, which consists of 132 sectors connected by two-way jumpgates. After the plot has been completed, jump co-ordinates for an additional 5 sectors can be obtained. The main area of each sector typically contains several stations and at least one gate. The game is open-ended allowing the player to go where they like, when they like, doing whatever they like; a player is limited only by their in-game status and resources. As such, a driving force of the game is to acquire credits, the universal currency and status.

Using credits, a player can buy wares from a station. These wares may then be flown to another station where they can be sold, ideally for a higher price. The prices vary - from minute to minute or second to second - depending on demand. The scarcer a ware is, the higher its price. As such, the X-Universe has a dynamic market-driven economy. A player can capitalize on emergent trends to make vast profits; or, just as easily, can waste money and time on a bad cargo choice. As a player accumulates profits they can buy equipment, weapons, ships and stations. The player can acquire an unlimited number of ships and stations, of varying size, shape and function. The player can build factories to produce goods (including weapons and shields) to sell or use. As the factories require resources, the player can set up ships to perform trading tasks for factories such as buying resources from other stations or selling the product.

The game contains numerous races. Several races feature a full economy and can be interacted with by the player through trading, reputation and missions. Several hostile races limit the amount of interactivity to combat. Reputation between the player and the social races can be built up through missions, defending their space, or trading in their space. The reputation affects how these individuals of that races respond to the player, and what kind of missions are offered. A player status is categorized according to 'Mercantile' skill, 'Combat' skill, and a 'Notoriety' ranking for each race.

== Development ==
Enlight Software acquired the North American rights to the game in August 2003. The game went gold on November 5 of the same year.

== Expansion pack ==
An expansion pack called X2: The Return was in development but was cancelled in favour of X3.

== Reception ==
Reception

Aggregate scores
Aggregator	Score
GameRankings	76%
Metacritic	72/100

Review scores
Publication	Score
Computer Gaming World	3.5/5
Eurogamer	5/10
Game Informer	7/10
GameSpot	7.2/10
GameSpy	4.5/5
GamesTM	5/10
GameZone	8.4/10
IGN	7.3/10
PC Format	74%
PC Gamer (US)	77%

X2: The Threat received "average" reviews according to the review aggregation website Metacritic. Many reviewers praised the graphics and the amount of freedom offered to the player. Common complaints were that the game, like its predecessors, was quite slow-paced and had a steep learning curve.

IGN gave the game an average review, praising the visuals and display, but expressing frustration with elements of gameplay: "There are better places to go for trading simulations, and better places to go for space combat. X2s ambitions in trying to meld both themes ended up falling short of what most people would find entertaining.... its complexity [as a trading simulator] is wasted when the money is really made with only one type of product". GameSpot referred to the game as a "diamond in the rough" for patient players, as well as "extremely ambitious but not very accessible". Eurogamer criticized the game for being for "hardcore fans only" because of its complexity, also calling it a "superbly ambitious game which achieves much of what it sets out to do".

== See also ==
- List of PC games
