= The Halley Project =

1985 video game

The Halley Project: A Mission In Our Solar System
- Developer: Tom Snyder
- Publisher: Mindscape
- Designers: Omar Khudari; Tom Snyder
- Programmers: Apple, C64, Amiga; Leonard Bertoni
- Platforms: Apple II, Atari 8-bit, Commodore 64, Amiga
- Release: 1985
- Genre: Space flight simulation
- Mode: Single-player

The Halley Project: A Mission In Our Solar System is a space flight simulation game developed for the Apple II, Commodore 64, and Atari 8-bit computers by Omar Khudari and Tom Snyder and published by Mindscape in 1985. An Amiga version with updated graphics was released in 1986.

== Plot ==
The player assumes the role of a spacecraft pilot whose mission is to travel between the various bodies of the Solar System. The game opens with a mix of electric guitar music and digitized speech during which the player is shown the text of a transmission sent from the headquarters of a body known as "P.L.A.N.E.T.":

Greetings,
You have been chosen from all the pilots in the Solar System to attempt to qualify for The Halley Project team. If you do indeed qualify, you will be invited to take part in the greatest scientific adventure in history: The Halley Project ... the Final Challenge.
Good luck, you will need it.
Neal "Buzz" Collins
Starbird 1st Class
P.L.A.N.E.T. out

== Gameplay ==
The player starts out from a base on Halley's Comet and must first make his way to Earth, and then back to Halley. As longer and more difficult missions are completed, the player's rank increases from the starting level of Raven through Shrike, Vulture, Darter, Condor, Swift, Nighthawk, Falcon, Eagle, and finally Starbird.

A secret mission at the end of the game is accessible by typing in a password mailed by the software company after the player completes the last registered mission and receives a number code. The code is then mailed to "Project Halley" (in reality the software company that designed the game) on a pre-packaged postcard. A letter is then received from the software company instructing the player to load the program, initiate the Starbird level, go to Earth, and type MINDSCAPE to access the secret mission.

The Halley Project is distinctive for the accuracy and sense of realism it seeks to convey. The distances between worlds are realistic, their sizes reasonably accurate, and the task of landing safely often less than easy — a small window at a certain point in orbit must be reached in a given amount of time. Travel across the vast distances of the solar system is made bearable by one of the game's few fictional elements, a hyperdrive that engages when the speed of the craft reaches 300,000 kilometers per second (the speed of light). Navigation takes place entirely in a plane with no "vertical" component, though the direction the ship travels and the direction it faces are each controlled separately. The player is aided by a radar system that pinpoints the planets on a circular display centered on the ship's position, around which are also marked the 12 constellations of the Zodiac. The range of the radar can be zoomed from 50 million kilometers out to 10 billion.

== Reception ==
A review in Computer Gaming World praised the game for seamlessly weaving educational material about the solar system into the game. The game's scoring system, which imposes no penalty for taking time to plan a flight, was also praised, as were the visuals and sounds. However, the five-week wait for the final mission was considered frustrating.

The Australian Commodore and Amiga Review analyzed the Amiga version, mentioning: "A difficult game for the beginner, perseverance holds its own rewards. It is very satisfying to confidently approach a landing knowing that you have made good time and you are able to land safely, the music which plays when you are in range of base relaxes you completely and washes away the tension of the flight."
