= X (video game series) =

Simulator series by Egosoft

- Genre: Space trading and combat simulator
- Developer: Egosoft
- Publishers: THQ (1999–2000); Deep Silver (2003–2011); Egosoft (2013–present)
- Platforms: Linux, macOS, Microsoft Windows
- First release: X: Beyond the Frontier: WW: July 1, 1999
- Latest release: X4: Foundations: WW: November 30, 2018

X is a science fiction space trading and combat simulator series created by German developer Egosoft. The series is set in the X-Universe where several races populate a number of worlds connected by jumpgates.

The series, which was launched in 1999 on the Windows platform, consists of five base games: X: Beyond the Frontier, X2: The Threat, X3: Reunion, X Rebirth and X4: Foundations. The series games are expanded by sequels that both add features and extend the plot. A plot can be undertaken in all games except X-Tension where the player takes part in missions to unfold events.

In 2010, Egosoft released the X-Superbox, a pack containing all the X series games up to that date: X: Beyond the Frontier, X-Tension, X2: The Threat, X3: Reunion, and X3: Terran Conflict. Included in the pack was extra missions within Terran Conflict. Additionally, owners of the pack also obtained X3: Albion Prelude for free when it was released in 2011.

Release timeline Bold italic: Standalone, Italic: DLCs
1999	X: Beyond the Frontier
2000	X-Tension
2001
2002
2003	X2: The Threat
2004
2005	X3: Reunion
2006
2007
2008	X3: Terran Conflict
2009
2010
2011	X3: Albion Prelude
2012
2013	X Rebirth
2014	X Rebirth: The Teladi Outpost
2015
2016	X Rebirth: Home of Light
2017	X Rebirth VR Edition
2018	X4: Foundations
2019
2020	X4: Split Vendetta
2021	X4: Cradle of Humanity
2021	X3: Farnham's Legacy
2022	X4: Tides of Avarice
2023	X4: Kingdom End
2024	X4: Timelines
2025	X4: Hyperion Pack
2025	X4: Envoy Pack

== Synopsis ==
Hundreds of millions of years ago, several races (nicknamed "the Ancients") transcended their physical form, combining into a single collective consciousness, and built billions of jumpgates throughout the universe. Their purpose was to limit the development of faster-than-light travel in other races, inducing them to rely on the gates to explore the universe. This enables the Ancients to act as shepherds of life, preventing wars between civilizations and monitoring the development of new ones.

However, the Ancient failed to notice the rise of humanity and never placed jumpgates in the Solar System, so they were blindsided when mankind discovered the principle behind wormholes by chance in 2022. Over the course of the 21st century, humans experimented with their own jumpgate technology and successfully built a pair linking Earth and Mars, paving the way for the colonization of the Solar System and beyond: one of the two jumpgates was launched towards Alpha Centauri in an attempt to claim a foothold in interstellar space, but in 2041, Earth lost contact with it, and while trying to re-establish the connection, instead locked onto Ancient-made ones, causing them to stumble into the X-Universe. In response, the Ancients rearranged some gates to contain humans in their own isolated network devoid of other life. In 2045, humanity began to explore this sub-network, finding plenty of suitable planets for terraforming and colonisation. Self-replicating AI ships, the Terraformers, were sent out into the network to find and terraform planets, but in 2145, ships corrupted by a final update meant to install a self-destruct protocol (which was both badly-made and sabotaged by the disgruntled head of the terraforming project) started targeting inhabited worlds, killing billions in what came to be called the First Terraformer War. Earth was saved by Nathan Ridley Gunne, the commander of its space navy, who lured the Terraformer fleet out of the Solar System before the human-made jumpgate was destroyed behind them. Earth was saved, but the stranded colonists discovered the alien ones now led to a completely different network.

This part of humanity now separated from Earth formed a new civilisation called the Argon Federation, a name derived from "R. Gunne", with one of the least devastated colonies, Sonra IV, chosen as the capital under the name "Argon Prime". The Argon gradually lost their cultural connection with Earth, even adopting a new year counting system (NT, for New Time) in 2170 and starting the narrative that Earth never existed, partly to prevent the remaining Terraformers from finding a new way back to the Solar System. Those that resisted this decision kept archives of "Old Earth" in hope of an eventual reunion, eventually evolving into what was considered a fringe cult in Argon society, called the Goner. The new configuration of the network, limited to the Milky Way, did not leave humans alone however, and the Argon first encountered an alien species, the theocratic Paranid, in 130 NT. The peaceful Boron followed in 323 NT, the war-like Split in 324 NT, and the commerce-oriented Teladi in 550 NT. Over the centuries, attacks from Terraformers, now referred to as "Xenon" by the Argon, would occasionally flare up, eventually leading into a war called the Xenon Conflict in 225 NT. Due to another war, the Boron Campaign, breaking out between the first four races in the wake of the Split first contact, all five gradually formed the Community of Planets to try and maintain peace between themselves.

Meanwhile, in their isolation, many on Earth lived in fear a new Terraformer invasion, fueling centuries of militarism and anti-AGI sentiment, but also technological advance, while some dreamed of reaching the stars again. In 2912, they managed to invent the jumpdrive, a device that allows faster-than-light travel without jumpgates. However, it overloaded during testing, stranding pilot Kyle William Brennan in the Teladi capital system Seizewell during a new buildup of Xenon forces, kicking off the events of the games proper.

=== Featured races ===
The X-Universe features several sentient species:

- Boron: A pacifist, squid-like aquatic race led by a matriarchal monarchy known as the Queendom of Boron. Their homeworld is Nishala, an ammonia-rich ocean planet in the Kingdom End system.
- Humans: Divided into two main factions:
  - Argon: Humans who are descended from the remains of the fleet that saved Earth in the Terraformer War, and the colonists trapped with them. They named themselves after their heroic captain Nathan R. Gunne, who lured the Terraformers away from the Earth and discovered what would be chosen as the new home system, Sonra IV (eventually renamed to Argon Prime). The Argon Federation's government decided centuries ago that the pain of separation with Earth was best dealt with by changing the official version of history so that humans in the X-Universe believed they evolved there, which would also make it harder for the Terraformers to find Earth again.
    - Argons who believed in Earth, despite it being officially just a myth, formed the Goner sect (also named after Gunne) to save as much information on it as they could; after it is reconnected to the X-Universe, they try to become a diplomatic intermediary between the two factions.
  - Terrans: Humans who still live in the Solar System, known as the Sol Protectorate in X4. Due to their intense fear of a new Terraformer invasion, they are the most technologically-advanced faction after the Ancients, and much more militaristic than the Argon.
- Kha'ak: An insectoid race that started war with the Argon in X2: The Threat by completely destroying the sector of President's End. They seem incapable of communicating with any other race, and are named after a parasitic monster from Split folklore. The Kha'ak ignore the confines of the jumpgate network due to having a jumpdrive of their own design, as their homeworld in Kha'ak Sector 926 (which appears to have been destroyed) also does not have any gate.
- Paranid: A large, three-eyed, flightless bird-like race with a strict religion that worships mathematics, especially dimensional ones, ruled by the "Xaar" pontifex as the Godrealm of the Paranid. They are the most scientifically-advanced race of the Community of Planets. They are in cold war with the Argon ever since the Paranid refused to form an alliance with them in the Xenon Conflict. Their homeworld is Eighth Eye, a desertic super-Earth in the Paranid Prime system, due to which they also possess immense strength and extreme environmental resistance.
- Split : A humanoid tribal race known to be strong, hot-headed, and violent; they are ruled by the head of the most powerful family in the Great Patriarchy of the Split. They only respect the Paranid, who are even stronger, and absolutely despise the Boron for their pacifism, to the point of declaring war on them upon first contact with them. They abandoned their homeworld after their wars made it uninhabitable, with their primary system Family Pride merely serving as the capital of their empire.
- Teladi: A reptilian race that values trade and profits over everything else; they have a corporate government–the Teladi Company–and are the biggest economic power of the Community of Planets. Their homeworld is Ianamus Zura, a swampy planet that was lost in the network configuration after the First Terraformer War, but was found again before the events of X2.
- Xenon: A self-replicating artificial intelligence evolved from the Terraformers created by the Terrans in an effort to colonise worlds. Now hostile to all life due to damaged programming, they destroy anything they come across other than themselves, with most worlds they occupy overterraformed to the point of being reduced to lava planets. Named by the Argon as a shorthand for "xenomorph", initially used as a codeword for unidentified alien ships.

== The X series ==
The series, which was launched in 1999 on the Windows platform, consists of five base games: X: Beyond the Frontier, X2: The Threat, X3: Reunion, X Rebirth and X4: Foundations. The series games are expanded by sequels that both add features and extend the plot. A plot can be undertaken in all games except X-Tension where the player takes part in missions to unfold events. In 2010, Egosoft released the X-Superbox, a pack containing all the X series games up to that date. Included in the pack was extra missions within Terran Conflict. Additionally, owners of the pack also obtained X3: Albion Prelude for free when it was released in 2011.

Title	Date released	Platform(s)	Ref.
X: Beyond the Frontier	1 July 1999	Windows	
X-Tension	1 June 2000	Windows	
X2: The Threat	3 December 2003	Linux, macOS, Windows	
X3: Reunion	28 October 2005	Linux, macOS, Windows	
X3: Terran Conflict	16 October 2008	Linux, macOS, Windows	
X3: Albion Prelude	15 December 2011	Linux, macOS, Windows	
X Rebirth	15 November 2013	Linux, macOS, Windows	
X Rebirth: The Teladi Outpost	11 December 2014	Linux, macOS, Windows	
X Rebirth: Home of Light	25 February 2016	Linux, macOS, Windows	
X Rebirth VR Edition	15 July 2017	Windows	
X4: Foundations	30 November 2018	Linux, Windows	
X4: Split Vendetta	31 March 2020	Linux, Windows	
X4: Cradle of Humanity	16 March 2021	Linux, Windows	
X3: Farnham's Legacy	4 May 2021	Linux, macOS, Windows	
X4: Tides of Avarice	14 March 2022	Linux, Windows	
X4: Kingdom End	12 April 2023	Linux, Windows	
X4: Timelines	20 June 2024	Linux, Windows	

== Books ==
So far, six tie-in books have been written by Helge Kautz, all in German:

- X: Farnhams Legende, 2000, Panini, ISBN 3-8332-1204-7
- X2: Nopileos, 2004, Panini, ISBN 3-8332-1041-9
- X3: Yoshiko, 2006, Panini, ISBN 3-8332-1344-2
- X3: Hüter der Tore, 2009, Panini, ISBN 978-3-8332-1793-7
- X3: Wächter der Erde, 2009, Panini, ISBN 978-3-8332-1942-9
- X Rebirth: Plutarch Rising, 2013, Panini, ISBN 978-3-8332-2703-5

Additionally, two English language novels by were published by Trafford Publishing in 2004 as part of an anthology X-Universe Volume One (ISBN 978-1-4120-1955-2): Dominion by Darren "Steel" Astles and Rogue Testament by Steve Miller.
