= X3: Albion Prelude =

2011 space trading and combat simulator

- Game cover
- Developer: Egosoft
- Publisher: Deep Silver
- Composer: Alexei Zakharov
- Series: X
- Engine: X TECH 2/X3 Reality Engine
- Platforms: Microsoft Windows, Mac OS X, Linux
- Release: December 15, 2011 (Steam); December 23, 2011 (Mac); May 15, 2013 (Linux)
- Genre: Space trading and combat simulator
- Mode: Single-player

X3: Albion Prelude is a space trading and combat simulator by German developer Egosoft and is the fifth game in their X series. An add-on to 2008's X3: Terran Conflict, X3: Albion Prelude features new content, functionality and improvements, including additional ships, stations, and sectors; a new plot line; war scenario sectors, and several stock exchanges. X3: Albion Prelude was released on Steam on 15 December 2011. A downloadable content (DLC) pack, X3: Farnham's Legacy, was released in May 2021.

== X3: Farnham's Legacy ==
On 4th May 2021, Egosoft released X3: Farnham's Legacy for Windows. This fan made stand-alone expansion was released freely for all owners of Albion Prelude. Along with the free release, a donation pack was released to show appreciation to the community which raised €5,000 for Médecins Sans Frontières matched with an additional €5,000 for flood relief in Aachen.

Farnham's Legacy added new features such as: an increased focus on exploration and the addition of the Explorer's Guild; dynamic player relations with factions and the ability to engage in diplomacy; and the ability for player's to own sectors and have their very own player headquarters. The story takes place after the events of Albion Prelude and the jumpgate shutdown.

On 9th July, Farnham's Legacy released for Linux.

== Reception ==
X3: Albion Prelude

Aggregate scores
Aggregator	Score
GameRankings	69.00%
Metacritic	75/100

Review score
Publication	Score
PC Gamer (UK)	69/100

Albion Prelude was generally well received, with a score of 75 out of 100 on Metacritic.

== See also ==
- List of PC games
