= X3: Reunion =

2005 single-player space trading and combat video game

- Developer: Egosoft (Note: Ported to Mac by Virtual Programming)
- Publishers: EU: Deep Silver; NA: Enlight; WW: Linux Game Publishing (Linux)
- Composer: Alexei Zakharov
- Series: X
- Engine: X3 Reality Engine/X TECH 2
- Platforms: Linux, Mac OS X, Windows
- Release: Windows: EU: October 28, 2005; NA: November 10, 2005; Mac OS X: WW: May 22, 2007 (Online); WW: June 2007; Linux: WW: December 5, 2008; WW: May 14, 2013 (Steam)
- Genre: Space simulation
- Mode: Single-player

X3: Reunion is a single-player space trading and combat video game developed by Egosoft and published by Deep Silver. It is the third installment in the X series and the sequel to X2: The Threat (2003), which in turn followed X: Beyond the Frontier (1999). X3: Reunion was released originally for Windows in 2005. The game was later ported to Mac OS X and Linux. A sequel based on the game was released, X3: Terran Conflict (2008), which received the standalone expansion X3: Albion Prelude (2011).

Egosoft have continued to expand and develop the game since release, adding new ships and equipment, a new kind of station, new modding tools, and a new series of missions. New material for the game – official and fan-made – is frequently released through Egosoft's official website.

== Gameplay ==
=== Overview ===
X3: Reunion incorporates open-ended "sandbox" gameplay. The main quest can be postponed or ignored as the player explores the expansive universe and spends the most time in control of a ship, doing tasks of their own choosing. Different ships are available for various tasks: small, fast scouting ships; freighters; powerful battleships; and massive carriers for moving a fleet. Most ships seen in the game can be bought or captured, and flown by the player. The player is free to go anywhere in the X-Universe at any time and explore, complete plot-related goals or to fulfil their own personal goals.

=== New features ===
X3 uses a new, specifically developed graphics engine to give highly detailed renders of ships and stations, along with photo-realistic planets and a host of new effects, including lighting, shadow and reflection. Graphically, Egosoft redesigned everything from scratch. The stations are restructured, larger and more detailed. Few contain the internal docking ports of the prior games, instead featuring external docking clamps. Ship sizes have been redesigned according to a logical scale. Egosoft ensured a pilot would actually fit in their cockpit, and that a carrier vessel was actually large enough to carry a given number of ships. As such, ships and stations are noticeably different in size from prior games.

The HUD has also been altered. Egosoft removed non-functional internal cockpit graphics, giving the player a largely unobstructed view of space. There are now markers over game objects such as ships, stations and large asteroids, and each object is selectable by a simple mouse click, or via a keyboard or controller. X3 uses a new interface designed to be faster, more user friendly, and compatible with a console controller. The game carries over many of the same short-cut keys from previous games, but now the mouse too can be used for functions including menu navigation, target selection, flying and combat.

The economy has been redesigned to be more sophisticated, with non-player ships now in direct competition with the player. New tools have been added to help the player compete in the X-Universe, including a new way of linking factories together into complexes which can be self-sustaining to varying degrees. There are also new in-game software products that allow a player to automate operations. In addition, Egosoft presents the player with a number of new scripting tools encouraging computer literate players to write their own functions into the game. This is further supported through Egosoft's scripts and Modding forum, where players share ideas.

The X3 Reality Engine allowed for far more realistic visuals than seen in previous games.

Combat AI is improved, and enemy behavior redesigned. Many pirates now travel in gangs, often heavily armed, making them much more threatening than in earlier games. There are also smugglers, pirates who remain hidden until their cargo is scanned for contraband wares. There are now pirate missions available to the player, as well as a new pirate faction, known as the Yaki. Xenon and Kha'ak remain the primary antagonists; both races are entirely hostile and will often mount full scale sector invasions.

Status has far more relevance than in previous games. Now, many kinds of weapon, ship, and factory are not purchasable until the player has earned sufficient reputation with the vendor race. With some races, reputation can be earned through trade; with others, the player must earn respect by killing unwanted visitors in the race's space - such as pirates, Khaak, or Xenon. Some races appreciate both. By choosing to be an upstanding citizen, the player can earn the right to buy powerful new weapons, ships and technologies. By engaging in piracy, destruction, smuggling or other crime the player may lose reputation, and so may lose the privilege to buy things. The persistent wrongdoer may lose the right to land at stations, or even to enter sectors, being attacked on sight. Eventually, the player may find it impossible to buy many of the game's most powerful ships, weapons and technologies (although such things may still be possible to acquire through less orthodox means).

=== Universe ===
The Argon Buster: the first ship for many new players.

In X3, the X-Universe consists of around 160 sectors connected by two-way jumpgates. The main area of each sector typically contains several stations and up to four gates. The game is open-ended, allowing the player to go where they like, when they like, doing whatever they like; a player is limited only by their in-game status and resources. As such, a driving force of the game is to acquire credits (the universal currency) and status.

The game contains numerous races. Status affects how individuals in different races respond to the player and what kind of missions are offered. A player's status is categorised according to "Mercantile" skill, "Combat" skill and a "Notoriety" ranking for each race.

Using credits, a player can buy wares from stations. These wares may be used, or flown to another station where they can be sold for a profit. However, prices fluctuate based on supply and demand, simulating a market-driven economy. A player can capitalise on emergent trends, meeting demand to make vast profits, or as easily, can waste money and time on a bad cargo choice. In X3, many NPC ships have the same plan, and the player can easily miss their intended market if another ship arrives first. As players builds profit they can buy equipment, weapons, ships, and even their own factories.

Factory stations consume power and resources to produce products, which can then be sold into the X economy. If the product is rare, and the resources are cheap and plentiful, the factory can make profit, but if not, it is possible to lose money. By filling a gap in the economy, a player can make solid and consistent profit through a factory. However, X3's economy is self-adjusting; NPCs are also able to build factories and can similarly profit. As such, X3 has the most advanced, realistic, and arguably the most competitive economy of all the X games.

The player can acquire an unlimited number of ships and stations, of varying size, shape and function. Starting with little, the players can build their empire, set their own goals, and choose their own path in how they wish to shape the universe.

=== Trade ===
There are many different wares in X3. Some are produced, others are constantly available such as software upgrades. Example classes of ware include lasers, missiles, shields, energy, minerals, foodstuffs, technological and biological.

=== Stations ===
Factories are stations which use resources to create one or many products. The needed resources and produced wares need to be transported by a ship. Traders in the universe must move wares between the factories to keep production going; if supply exceeds demand a factory will often stop producing goods. The player can build factories by buying them at a shipyard and loading them on board a large transport ship (TL class). The player factories can own their own ships to buy resources and sell products. There are many factory options to configure the trader ships behaviour and job. Player factories can also connect to each other to share resources and products. The factories are connected through tubes and the docking bay is moved to a central complex hub.

Trading Stations are usually found in every established sector. They each have a list of wares which they buy and sell at a fixed price. Equipment docks are trading stations which are aimed at the distribution of ship upgrades and equipment. They trade in missiles, lasers, shields, software and upgrades. All types of ships can dock at an equipment dock. Wares in both stations gradually deplete over time, ensuring a steady demand for higher-tier goods.

Shipyards sell ships and stations to the player. The player can sell and repair their ships at shipyards.

Pirate bases are located around the X-universe. The player can buy and sell illegal goods in these stations. The player can also hire a hacker to change stations from hostile to friendly, allowing the player's ships to dock at stations they would not normally be able to trade with.

There are a handful of special stations which do not produce any goods and are used in the plot.

=== NPC Trading Ships ===
Trading ships move wares from one station to another. The NPC traders can specialise in one or more classes of ware and provide factories with their resources. Unlike previous games in the X series, NPC traders are not owned by a single factory or station, but are instead all freelance traders, looking for the best trade runs between stations.

=== Ship classifications ===
A range of different ship classes are available to fill different game functions. With some exceptions, each race produces their own kind of ship for each class.

== Synopsis ==
=== Characters and setting ===
The game is set in Earth year 2935 (X Universe year X 765), in a universe (seemingly) far removed from our own. The player reprises the role of Julian Gardna, also known as Julian Brennan, from the previous game.

After his arrival at Argon Prime, Julian is contacted by his old friend Ban Danna of the Argon Secret Service. Danna informs him that the Argon military has suffered heavy losses in their war with the Kha'ak, and asks Julian to help in training some new pilots. Julian agrees and soon a series of events unfold, leading Julian to hunt down the seeds, ancient alien artifacts that may hold the key to making jump-gates, and allow a reunion with the lost planet Earth.

For X3's plot, Egosoft hired an experienced game and TV writer, Andrew S. Walsh.

=== Plot ===
X3: Reunion picks up where X2 left off – the Kha'ak are assaulting all areas of the X Universe, and Julian's father, Kyle, is still in a coma after being rescued from the Kha'ak. The player is then involved in an intricate plot, revealing the reason for the Kha'ak attack, the quest to open a portal to Earth with special gem artifacts, the introduction of a mysterious alien race, Kyle's re-awakening, and the arrival of Terran (Earth) forces in the X Universe.

A mysterious alien only referred to as "Sargon" manipulates events during the story. A Goner named Ion tasks Julian with finding three crystals and an artifact referred to as the "seed" to help open a gate to Earth. During the storyline, Julian meets the pirate Don Toni Marani and his daughter, who help in later missions. Ion attempts to run off with the artifacts once he gets them, but when captured he reveals he was being manipulated by Sargon. Kyle re-awakens from his coma, but his brain waves are still linked to the Kha'ak, leading them to conduct another assault in Paranid space. The Argon Federation declare Kyle to be an enemy to appease the Paranid.

Julian is also marked an enemy by the Argon Federation, hoping to avoid a war with the Paranid, who accuse Julian of committing crimes in their territory. The Paranid are finally revealed to have provoked the Kha'ak into attacking the races of the X-Universe, after one of their scouting missions found the Kha'ak's home world. The Paranid also have been strip mining the valuable Nividium asteroids, which further anger the Kha'ak, who make their homes from Nividium. The mined Nividium alongside synthesised versions of the artifacts were being fashioned into jump gates, by which the Paranid hoped to manipulate the economy.

A gate to Earth is opened, which Kyle passes through, causing the Kha'ak to discover it. They try to go through it and fight a combined Teladi, Boron and Argon fleet led by Ban Danna, inflicting large casualties. Julian and Ion try to stabilise the gate with the Teladi station, which sends them both through it, killing Ion. Julian survives and finds himself floating at a gate near Earth, with a massive fleet moving towards him. It is the Terran fleet, and with Kyle and Julian on board it passes through the jump hole and helps the overwhelmed defenders against the Kha'ak. The Terrans afterwards harbor distrust towards the X Universe races, even the Argon humans, prompting Kyle to return to Earth to try to correct the situation. Julian is released, pardoned of his crimes by the Argon Federation and the Paranid Empire, and the player is left to do whatever he wants in the post-plot universe.

== Development ==
X3: Reunion was developed by Egosoft and published by Deep Silver. It began as project X2: The Return, Egosoft's planned extension for X2: The Threat, but as the project advanced, it soon outgrew the constraints of the X2 engine. By April 2005, Egosoft cancelled X2: The Return, and the game, using the new X3 Engine, would become X3: Reunion. A month later, they demonstrated the power of the "X3 Reality Engine" in Electronic Entertainment Expo (E3), stunning industry insiders with high-definition moving renders of space stations, planets and other scenes. X3 was released later in October.

== Releases ==
X3: Reunion was released five months after the E3 in the EU on October 28, 2005, for Windows and on November 4 in North America. The game has been later ported to Linux and Mac OS X: Mac OS X for release in August 2007, and the Linux version on December 5, 2008.

The game was also intended to be Egosoft's first multiplatform release on both Windows and Xbox. Shortly before release the Xbox version was confirmed to be cancelled.

=== Patches and updates ===
The original retail release version of X3: Reunion was plagued by a number of bugs and issues - including a bug which prevented the player from completing the game.

Subsequently, Egosoft released a series of patches, first to resolve problems and later to add new features, expanding the game. Patches 1.2 to 1.4 were primarily aimed at eliminating bugs, improving performance and resolving compatibility issues.

An updated manual was released for the game in a PDF file in December 2005. This can be obtained from the downloads section of the official page. At 97 pages long, it is 16 pages longer than the first version. It contains information about the changes in the v1.4 patch, and corrections to errors in the earlier manual that shipped with the game.

=== Digital distribution re-releases ===
Both X3 and its predecessor X2 became available via Valve's Steam online content delivery system in July 2006, with the StarForce copy protection system removed. This version came on online content delivery system gog.com in November 2015 and is fully DRM-free.

=== X3 Reunion 2.0 re-release ===
Egosoft released version 2.0.01 of X3: Reunion including the Bala Gi Expansion on November 11, 2006. This contained many new ships, features, new sectors and further bug fixes. Bala Gi's missions are available to players who have logged 10 game hours, have at least 5 million credits on account, have a good reputation with the Boron, are not an enemy of the Split or Paranid, and own at least one station. Rewards include the Player Headquarters, the unique M7 frigate class prototype ship the Hyperion, and the ability to build the new M3+ class of Heavy Fighters. The availability of these missions is not dependent on the main plot and saved games from previous versions are able to receive the new missions and mission rewards.

The game itself was relaunched as a budget PC DVD-ROM titled X3 Reunion 2.0. The re-release has the 2.0 patch already applied, and contains no trace of StarForce Copy Protection.

=== Mac OS X port ===
The original version of X3: Reunion for Mac OS X used the Cider "wrapper" technology developed by Transgaming. Virtual Programming issued a new version of the game that eschewed Cider in June 2010. Virtual Programming CEO Mark Hinton said that they were not satisfied with game's performance when using Cider, and that the customers did not want it either; as a result they reengineered the game as a native port, made as a free update for existing customers.

=== X-Superbox Bundle re-release ===
The "X Superbox" was released by Deep Silver and Egosoft in August 2010, which includes all of the games from the X series.

== Reception ==
=== Pre-release ===
X3 first showed at the Electronic Entertainment Expo (E3) in May 2005, where it received considerable praise for its visuals, described as "beautiful" (GameSpot), "all very stylish and sharp" (IGN), and "by far the most visually impressive game at the booth". (The Inquirer)

=== Post-release ===
On release, the response was mixed. Some sources praised its vision, freedom and scope, but others complained of a buggy implementation, under-performance, and a steep learning curve.

PC Zone hailed it as "one of the few games that has the power to engage your imagination with pretty pictures, then actually live up to your imaginings when you get your hands on it" and GameZone gave it "Editor's Choice", calling it "a bona fide winner". On opposite side, GameSpy asked: "How much slack can you give a game that in many ways manages to achieve [its] lofty goal, but buries it under a painfully incomplete implementation?". Reviewers complained of low frame rates, frequent crashes, and bugs that made it impossible to complete the game. Complaints were also made about its complicated interface, exacerbated by an unhelpful manual which references "features and options that aren't even in the final version".

On the review aggregator GameRankings, it has an average score of 75% based on 39 reviews. On Metacritic, the game has an average score of 71 out of 100, based on 32 reviews, indicating mixed or average reviews.

=== Post-patches ===
While post-release reviews consistently criticised X3's numerous bugs and poor performance, Egosoft's released series of patches and an improved manual addressed these issues mostly. Computer Gaming World's Matt Peckham wrote that the patches managed to enhance performance and fix several bugs, and that X3 "evolved from a Byzantine hodgepodge to an actually accessible, massively multiform space sim".

X3: Reunion was named around 2013 as one of the 1001 Video Games You Must Play Before You Die.

== See also ==
- List of PC games
