= Magnetic (video game) =

2003 video game

Magnetic: The Game of Games
- Developer: Mulawa Dreaming
- Platform: Windows
- Release: 2003

Magnetic: The Game of Games is a 2003 video game developed by Australian studio Mulawa Dreaming. It was the second game by the studio after Xiama. The game had a players only forum on its web site. Magnetic Revisited was a redesigned and rewritten version released in 2010. The game would be followed by Magicama, and Cooroora.

== Development ==
The game was conceived in September 2000. According to design documents which refer to relevant people by first name only, Michael was brought in to playtest the game, Ursula was Concept Tester; she played Magnetic as it developed and wrote to her friend June about her experiences, thereby offering the developer live feedback, Penny served as Chief Test Pilot, and Jake served as the artist; he interpreted the developer's prototype designs. It was expected to ship at the end of April 2003.

== Plot and gameplay ==
Players wander around a deserted island by navigating through a series of photos, encountering 16 games to play.

The six save slots are visualised by the player choosing one of six companions to accompany them.

The game comes on one CD.

== Critical reception ==
Mr. Bill's Adventureland found the developing narrative throughout the game to be a nice touch. Adventure Gamers felt that the title was impressive for the type of game it was going for. PibWeb noted the company's proficiency had improved since Xiama. GameBoomers thought the game stood well against other puzzle games like Pandora and Jewels. Tap Repeatedly felt the game was not very good entertainment. Just Adventure described the title as a worthy successor to Xiama.

GameBoomers praised Magnetic Revisited due to its variation, entertainment, replayability, and addictive nature.
