= Egosoft =

German video game developer

Egosoft GmbH
- Formerly: Ego Software (1988–2006)
- Type: Private
- Industry: Video games
- Founded: 1988; 38 years ago
- Founder: Bernd Lehahn
- Headquarters: Würselen, Germany
- Key people: Bernd Lehahn (CEO)
- Products: X series
- Number of employees: 34 (2024)
- Website: egosoft.com

Egosoft GmbH (formerly Ego Software) is a German video game developer based in Würselen, Germany. The company was founded by Bernd Lehahn in 1988.

Egosoft is best known for its X series of video games, a series of space simulator games noted for combining open-ended gameplay, dynamic market-driven economy and compelling storyline. The series began in 1999 with X: Beyond the Frontier. Since then, the series has expanded with three sequels and three standalone expansions; the latest being X4: Foundations, released 30 November 2018.

== History ==
Egosoft was founded in Würselen by Bernd Lehahn in 1988, making it the oldest active video game company in Germany. Its first game, Hotel Detective, was released for the Amiga in June 1988.

In 2000, Egosoft planned a multiplayer online game called Online Universe or X Online. This project was intended to be "the next step in the evolution of Egosoft's X universe." Egosoft has since released a number of games, yet has given little indication of the progress of this project. In 2003, Egosoft staff were working on a later version—codenamed X2OL—which Egosoft chief executive officer Bernd Lehahn described as their "long-term goal." There is still no official information on the Online Universe, though there has been speculation that X2 and X3's 2007 uplink feature may be a positive spin-off of the project.

In late 2009, Egosoft announced that Terran Conflict completed the story started in X: Beyond the Frontier, taken by some to mean the end of the franchise. However, in March 2011 they announced on their X-Universe forums that they would be attending FedCon XX in Düsseldorf on 28 April 2011, and would show preview footage of their current project, previously only referred to by the codename TNBT (The Next Big Thing). However, on 20 April 2011, they released a trailer officially announcing X Rebirth, initially slated for a Q4 2011 release. X Rebirth will take place in the X Universe after a major catastrophe (the shutdown of the series' network of jump gates, thus starting a new chapter in the X Universe separate from the original plot line. Rebirth missed its first two proposed release dates (Q4 2011 and 2012) and was eventually released 15 November 2013.

== Games developed ==
Year	Title	Platform(s)	Publisher(s)	Notes
1988	Hotel Detective	Amiga	Euroline	
1990	Fatal Heritage	Amiga	Delta Konzept	
1990	R1 R2	Amiga	Delta Konzept	Promotional game for Reemtsma
1991	Aquarius Game	Amiga	Delta Konzept	Promotional game for Aquarius
1991	Pepsi: All Over the World	Amiga	Delta Konzept	Promotional game for Pepsi
1992	Light American Spacegame	Amiga	Delta Konzept	Promotional game for Philip Morris International
1992	Come Together (Around the World)	Amiga	Delta Konzept	Promotional game for Peter Stuyvesant
1992	Ugh!	Amiga	Play Byte	
1993	Elefanten!	Amiga	Promotion Software	Promotional game for World Wide Fund for Nature
1993	Ketchup Connection	Amiga, MS-DOS	Promotion Software	Promotional game for Kraft Ketchup
1993	Flies: Attack on Earth	Amiga, MS-DOS	Rainbow Arts	
1994	Balduin: Run for Fun	MS-DOS	Delta Konzept	Promotional game for the Techniker Krankenkasse
1994	Abenteuer Europa	MS-DOS	Tevox	Promotional game for the Social Democratic Party of Germany
1995	Heiermanns Return	MS-DOS	Tevox	Promotional game for the Sparkasse of Gelsenkirchen
1996	Imperium Romanum	MS-DOS	Rainbow Arts	
1996	No Future?	Microsoft Windows	Delta Konzept	Promotional game for the Umweltbundesamt
1999	Power Pool	Microsoft Windows	Data Becker	
1999	X: Beyond the Frontier	Microsoft Windows	THQ, Egosoft	Entry in the X video game series
2000	X-Tension	Microsoft Windows	THQ, Egosoft	Entry in the X video game series
2003	X2: The Threat	Linux, macOS, Microsoft Windows	Deep Silver, Egosoft	Entry in the X video game series
2005	X3: Reunion	Linux, macOS, Microsoft Windows	Deep Silver, Egosoft	Entry in the X video game series
2008	X3: Terran Conflict	Linux, macOS, Microsoft Windows	Deep Silver, Egosoft	Entry in the X video game series
2011	X3: Albion Prelude	Linux, macOS, Microsoft Windows	Deep Silver, Egosoft	Entry in the X video game series
2013	X Rebirth	Linux, macOS, Microsoft Windows	Egosoft	Entry in the X video game series
2014	X Rebirth: The Teladi Outpost	Linux, macOS, Microsoft Windows	Egosoft	DLC for X Rebirth
2016	X Rebirth: Home of Light	Linux, macOS, Microsoft Windows	Egosoft	DLC for X Rebirth
2017	X Rebirth: VR Edition	Microsoft Windows	Egosoft	
2018	X4: Foundations	Linux, Microsoft Windows	Egosoft	Entry in the X video game series
2020	X4: Split Vendetta	Linux, Microsoft Windows	Egosoft	DLC for X4: Foundations
2021	X3: Farnham's Legacy	Linux, macOS, Microsoft Windows	Egosoft	Entry in the X video game series
2021	X4: Cradle of Humanity	Linux, Microsoft Windows	Egosoft	DLC for X4: Foundations
2022	X4: Tides of Avarice	Linux, Microsoft Windows	Egosoft	DLC for X4: Foundations
2023	X4: Kingdom End	Linux, Microsoft Windows	Egosoft	DLC for X4: Foundations
2024	X4: Timelines	Linux, Microsoft Windows	Egosoft	DLC for X4: Foundations
2025	X4: Hyperion Pack	Linux, Microsoft Windows	Egosoft	DLC for X4: Foundations
