= Xing: The Land Beyond =

2017 video game

- Developer: John Torkington Koriel Kruer James Steininger
- Publishers: White Lotus Interactive, LLC
- Composer: John Torkington
- Engine: Unreal Engine 4
- Platforms: Windows 7; Windows 8; Windows 10; Oculus Rift; HTC Vive; PlayStation 4; PlayStation VR
- Release: Sep 21, 2017
- Genres: puzzle; adventure
- Mode: Single-player

Xing: The Land Beyond is an adventure game by White Lotus Interactive, which was released on September 21, 2017 for Microsoft Windows. The game has full VR support for HTC Vive and Oculus Rift. A PlayStation VR version was released on February 12, 2019.

== Production ==
Conception of the game began back in 2012, when John Torkington and Koriel Kruer designed a level for a Level Design class with the theme "atmosphere"; their professor said anyone who had their work in the top ten in the IEEE competition would receive an A. After learning Unreal 3 editor using UDK (Unreal Development Kit), they designed a prototype, which was the first state of what would eventually become Xing. Development for the Oculus Rift began in June 2013. In 2014 the development team migrated their content to the recently released Unreal Engine 4. Their favorite puzzles involved the manipulation of the landscape and weather in order to progress, and they wanted to allow the player to solve puzzles in their own way.

The developers admitted in January 2018 that the sales were poor, which they put down to the overly saturated Steam market, most of the buzz happening two years before during the Kickstarter campaign, and the lack of dedicated marketing team.

== Plot and gameplay ==
While the player is dead, in death they encounter a journey through a series of mysterious lands.

Gameplay is in the form of a Myst-type exploration game.

== Reception ==
Adventure Gamers praised the 3D graphics and the intriguing ending.

The game won the Intel Developer Showcase award for best overall game.
