= Xiama =

2000 video game

- Developer(s): Mulawa Dreaming
- Publisher(s): Mulawa Dreaming
- Director(s): Peter Hewitt
- Producer(s): Peter Hewitt
- Designer(s): Peter Hewitt
- Programmer(s): Peter Hewitt
- Artist(s): Peter Hewitt
- Writer(s): Peter Hewitt
- Release: 2000
- Genre(s): Puzzle, adventure

Xiama is a 2000 puzzle adventure game by Townsville-based Australian studio Mulawa Dreaming, released on Windows. The game was self-published by its developer, Peter Hewitt, off his website and at a stall in Townville's "Cotter's Markets".

== Development ==
Peter Hewitt based the game on a trip he had through a national park, and used the photos he took there as the backdrop of the title. The game, developed solely by Hewitt, took around a year to complete. The title is an acronym. The game was playtested by a young puzzle lover named Penny, and were crafted to allow novices to have a go while challenging long-time puzzlers. Hewitt's favourite puzzle is The Venus Jigsaw. Some of his puzzles, such as the three turtle puzzles, don't require prior knowledge and can be completed with by press buttons and experimenting. Hewitt expected some of the more challenging puzzles to last more than one play session. He found the cave system one of the highlights to develop.

On March 15, 2000, Hewitt developed the concept of the Xiama "books" in order to get away from the usual games saving mechanism. The Xiama website went live on March 19. On April 24, Bill Basham gave permission for the use of his midi version of Waltzing Matilda. The post-its idea was implemented on May 18, as Hewitt had long wanted to add personal touches to the game. The puzzles were completed on June 1. On June 3, he negotiated a deal with Listening Earth to use their bird calls and dingo howls. On June 4, Bill Basham agreed to his use of "The Rejection" in the project. The game uses the ClickTeam Installation program.

The game had no marketing efforts either for or against women. Hewitt's "personalised and artisanal" web presence invited players ton open and direct dialogue, with items such as a diary detailing the game's development. Hewitt followed up this game with the puzzle adventures Magnetic and Magicama. Xiama Revisited was made in 2007 using BlitzBasic 2D, Paintshop Pro 9, Bryce 5, and CoolEdit 2000. It was play tested by Doug Bradley, and dedicated in the memory of Penny Cadwell. At the beginning of 2017 in January, both versions became free.

== Plot and gameplay ==
The in-game book allows players to see their progress throughout the game. Completed puzzles appear on the page while unfinished puzzles are left blank. The player score is shown at the bottom. The puzzles vary in design and theme.

The game is set in the North Queensland rainforest Alligator Creek Falls, located at Bowling Green Bay National Park. The player arrives at the park to meet up with their friend Peter for a trek, only to receive a note saying he's gone on ahead. The player proceeds to wander on alone, discovering a rich landscape along the way.

Xiama is a first person game primarily in 2D. The player progresses through a series of static screens, and interacts with hotspots to access puzzles. Like its follow-up Magnetic, Xiama blends 3D graphics with slideshow-styled photo backdrops. There are 24 puzzles placed within the 100 environments. Completing puzzles will unlock further areas and puzzles, and progressing through the game increases the player's score. The last puzzle is only unlocked after the player completes the other 23. The puzzles are superimposed onto photos of the national park. When the player completes a puzzle, a sticky note is added to their journal which contains some of the player's thoughts and reflections. Puzzles a re-scrambled when the player leaves the area, to enable the revisiting of old puzzles The soundscape consists of bird calls, campfire cracking, stream water, and animal noises; meanwhile, two puzzles revolve around the traditional folk song Waltzing Matilda.

The game is completable within a 24-hour period.

== Critical reception ==
MrBillsAdventureland felt the game reminded them of Jewels of the Oracle, due to its exotic and fascinating setting, and its challenging and addictive gameplay. The site felt, however, that its follow-up, Magnetic, would have a richer mix of game types and wished both these titles had junior versions for younger players. Quandary noted the game was not an adventure in the traditional sense, due to lacking inventory, item collection, and an unfolding story. Pibweb noted that the game was not 100% accurate, due to it including a cave scene, when Alligator Creek doesn't have a cave system. Just Adventure recommended the game to lovers of puzzles, photography, and nature. GameZone appreciated the fact that the game was not run of the mill. Game Vortex noted that the game's puzzles vary wildly in difficulty. Computer Games Online deemed it a "fiendishly cerebral offering", and felt that the in-game reward for completing the game came off as a "cruel joke". Academic Stephen Granade thought the game's largest deficiencies were in its interface and lack of documentation, and described it as playing like Myst, only more boring.

Adventure Gamers thought the game offered a better experience when played with family and friends. Thanks to the game, GameBoomers looked forward to future projects from Mulawa Dreaming. Mystery Manor felt the game was challenging, particular navigating around the park. BonusWeb forgave the amateurish screens as having a similar charm to the 1995 Czech point-and-click adventure game Ramonovo Kouzlo by Vochozka Trading. According to The Players' Realm, the game is "thoroughly rooted in the lost tradition" of gameplay consisting of progressing through a series of static panoramic screens through puzzle-solving and clue-collecting, as seen in titles such as Myst, Riven, and Jewels of the Oracle, in a genre "so beloved of earlier games scholarship". The book notes that the puzzles turn what would have been a slideshow into narrative architecture, in which the photographs become rewards for the completion of puzzles in the ludic experience.

In addition, Adventure Gamers thought that while far from a perfect game, Xiama captured the spirit of adventure gaming, and gave it the Best Puzzles of 2000 Award.
