= X3: Terran Conflict =

2008 space trading and combat simulator

- European box art
- Developer: Egosoft
- Publisher: Deep Silver (Note: Retail version distributed in North America by Interactive Gaming Software.) (Note: Ported to Mac by Virtual Programming.)
- Composer: Alexei Zakharov
- Series: X
- Engine: X TECH 2/X3 Reality Engine
- Platforms: Microsoft Windows, Mac OS X, Linux
- Release: 17 October 2008 (Windows); 22 October 2009 (Mac); 15 April 2013 (Linux)
- Genre: Space trading and combat simulator
- Mode: Single-player

X3: Terran Conflict is a space trading and combat simulator by German developer Egosoft, part of their X series of games. Described as a stand-alone game, based on X3: Reunion, it boasts new plot lines, features and assets. It was first released in October 2008 for the European market and Steam.

== Gameplay ==
X3: Terran Conflict is a single player, first-person space-based simulator where the player can explore and expand in a constantly changing environment. The player can navigate their ship across numerous sectors owned by the various races (Argon, Boron, Split, Paranid, Teladi, Xenon, Kha'ak, Terran, Pirate and Yaki) which are connected through devices termed Jumpgates, allowing for large-scale travel in the game universe. The entire game universe holds thousands of persistent stations and ships, with a varying economy which the player is encouraged to take part in through trading, construction, and in some instances combat. The game is open-ended, and the player is free to explore and perform various tasks at will, unless a mission instructs otherwise. There are several alien races which the player can interact with, through these interactions shaping his relationship with the races, becoming either friend or foe. Some races are presented as a constant threat where friendship is not an option. Each race has a military presence across the universe and skirmishes can break out without the player's involvement.

The player is capable of acquiring many different types of property, such as ships, stations, and factories. Ships can be piloted manually in the first-person by the player, or can be ordered to perform various tasks on their own such as engaging in combat and trading. Ships can also be grouped together to form wings, where they attempt to perform a task assigned by the player together without the player needing to order them individually. The number of assets the player can own is not limited by the game. Types of ships range from small scout ships equipped with light weaponry and shielding to large capital ships with various capabilities, which can be used for offense, factory construction, ware production or other purposes.

Combat can range from dogfights between small ships to large fleet battles involving many ships, small to large alike. There are several classes of weapons available for use, such as beam weapons, energy projectiles, ammo-based projectiles which must be kept stocked with the appropriate ammunition, various types of missiles, as well as mines. Each ship is usually capable of equipping a wide array of weapons, usually limited by the constructing race and ship size.

Several space installations are available to be built by the player. They can include factories, trading stations, stationary weapon platforms, and more. The player can also build a Headquarters, capable of many different tasks ranging from ware storage to ship construction. Factories can be built basically anywhere in a sector, usually to provide income to the player through the sale of the wares it produces, or the production of wares directly for the player's use. Wares can be bought from stations for a certain cost, and be either sold at another station (ideally for a profit) or to be used by the player. Certain wares are required at each type of station to produce the stations product. As an example, crystals are required at Solar Power Plants to produce its product – energy cells. Basic wares such as minerals, food, and energy go through several stages of production at various factories to become more advanced products, such as weapons, satellites, and drones.

Both plot-driven and generic missions are offered and take place in the universe itself, usually with some kind of reward for the player. Local events may alter the player's experience of the mission. The majority of missions are not restrictive, and the player can perform normal activities after the mission has been accepted and may call upon any available property to help with the objective.

As the game progresses, many more features are made available, such as connecting multiple factories to share resources, and training marines to board capital ships.

== Plot ==
Centuries before the events of X3: Terran Conflict, the Terrans built their own jumpgate technology, which accidentally connected to an abandoned network of alien jumpgates. They colonized many uninhabited worlds, using robotic spacecraft called Terraformers to make planets suitable for human life. A software error caused the Terraformers to malfunction and they rampaged across the colonies, re-terraforming planets, killing the inhabitants. During the last stand battle in Earth orbit, the Terraformers are drawn back through the jumpgate, which is self-destructed behind them, cutting Earth from the gate network. A small group of humans who led the Terraformers away continued to become the Argon race and the Terraformers evolved into the Xenon.

The player can play the role of many characters. If an alien is chosen as a character, the player must perform an additional mission to gain access to the Solar System. After the events of X3: Reunion, the Solar System is again connected to the gate network, albeit with different sectors and alien life present. The Terran race are far ahead of the other races technologically, but remain cautious almost to the point of xenophobia. Some Terrans begin to integrate with the commonwealth sectors and a dialogue forms between governments.

During a routine patrol in the Solar System, the player is called to battle in the Neptune system where Xenon are attacking. Using special beacons, they were able to jump deep into the Solar System without use of a jumpgate. During the battle, a small drone steals information from a Terran station and delivers it to an Argon ship in the Pluto sector which uses a jumpdrive to escape the Solar System. The player is tasked with investigating the odd activity of the Xenon who appear to be under influence of the unknown character.

The Xenon and pirate factions are found to be coordinating attacks to raid ships for valuable resources. New ships begin to appear which resemble the original form of Terraformers, attacking ships of the Boron race. The player aids the delivery of Terraformer wreckage to Terran scientists who deduce that these ships are remakes based on commonwealth technology.

Captain Robert Pearle, an undercover Terran operative has valuable information about the origin of these Terraformer ships but he has been discovered and arrested by Argon forces. The player meets up with fellow Terran agent Patricia Heywood to rescue Pearle from an Argon military sector. When Pearle has recovered, he accompanies the player on a mission to Split space where the Terraformers are rumoured to be built. A makeshift mobile factory is discovered and captured by Terran forces and several Split scientists are captured. Under interrogation, one of the scientists mentions the name, Aldrin.

Aldrin was a colony of the Terrans, established before the Terraformer war. The colonists managed to shut down their jumpgate and safeguard their Terraformers from the software error. Aldrin was presumed lost during the war. A scientist from the original Terraformer project, named Martin Winters, had survived the centuries by cryogenically freezing himself in deep space. He rediscovered the existence of Aldrin and set to work to recreate the Terraformer project using the preserved Terraformers in that sector.

The Terrans launch an offensive by reverse engineering a jump beacon to jump a fleet to Aldrin. They find a Terraformer CPU ship under control of Winters, and the Aldrin people suppressed due to Winters influence on the Terraformers. A fleet of Xenon ships joins the battle against the Terrans, defending Winters. A boarding party successfully takes control of the CPU ship and Winters again makes an escape. The player is tasked with escorting Aldrin dignitaries to the Earth Torus, making the Earth sector open to the player. Four additional plot lines are available for the player to pursue. Each is fully voiced and unlocks several unique features and assets.

== Development ==
A pre-release image of X3: Terran Conflict

X3: Terran Conflict is a standalone expansion of X3: Reunion, based in the same universe and using the same engine. X3: Reunion had several popular fan made mods, the most popular of which was named The X-Tended Mod. The Mod was created by a team of artists, musicians and modders and added new content and functionality to the game. XTM received attention from Egosoft who interviewed members of the team and hosted the mod for future downloads. X3: Terran Conflict has several assets used by the XTM mod and several members of the XTM team worked closely with Egosoft to develop the game.

Following the announcement of the game, several screen-shots and videos were made available, showing game-play, new features and content. A teaser trailer for X3: Terran Conflict was made available one month after the game was announced. It featured several new ships, stations, weapon systems and graphical effects. Terran ships, which were first seen in X3: Reunion's finale, made an appearance in this trailer.

A series of four informative gameplay videos were slowly released throughout the course of development. They were titled after each of the game's main gameplay premises: Trade, Fight, Build and Think. These videos featured a narrative introducing several new features in Terran Conflict. The first video, entitled Build was made available in July 2008. Focusing on station construction and player progression, this video reveals the existence of new stations and ship classes, as well as a new game-play feature to control large numbers of ships. This video confirms that the player headquarters, which was introduced in X3: Reunion version 2.0, is available in X3: Terran Conflict.

A developer blog was made available, documenting several experiences with the game development by several team members. An XTM and X3: Terran Conflict developer Bobby Wilkinson, known in the X3 community as Syklon, was the first to post, detailing some new aspects of the game.

== Release ==
The game went gold on 10 September 2008. The release was then pushed back twice due to production delays, finally falling on 17 October, two weeks after the initial release date of 3 October.

Some copies of Terran Conflict had become available several days before the release date. The Steam version was activated on the 16th, to coincide with the release of the first update. The release version was 1.0.1. Egosoft later confirmed that a shipping error had caused this.

X3: Terran Conflict Version 2.0 was released in North America on 7 April 2009. X³-Gold, the bundle pack containing X3: Terran Conflict 2.0 and X3: Reunion 2.5 was released few days later.

=== Updates ===
The first update for X3: Terran Conflict brought many improvements, in addition the first patch for the game on 6 October 2008. A whole new mission to scan for valuable asteroids was added; mouse control is enabled in external view mode; when a target is lost, the nearest enemy is targeted automatically; boarding crew functionality was improved; various improvements in the user interface as well as several other improvements and fixes. Version 1.2 was available to Steam users as soon as the game was activated whereas several DVD users played with version 1.0.1 for several days before the update was available. The update added a new mission, improved several features and fixed various issues. Egosoft released a second patch on 4 December, updating the game to version 1.3 and later on 22 December, they released a third patch, updating the game to version 1.4.

An open beta was announced by Egosoft in January 2009, for version 2.0 of Terran Conflict, which was available to forum members who have volunteered to be part of the 'Developer Network'. 2.0 contains 'a whole new mission, new stations and new sectors'. It was made available for download on 3 April. Due to a packing error, 2.0a was made available shortly after initial release to fix a problem, on 10 June and they released the sixth patch, updating the game to version 2.1. Later on 14 October, the seventh patch was released, updating the game to version 2.5. This patch along with numerous fixes and improvements removed the Tagès copy protection.

Egosoft has released an eighth patch on 27 April 2010, updating the game to version 2.6. This patch introduced achievements with the steam client. Before release of 2.6, Valve enabled X3: Terran Conflict DVD users to register their game on Steam so they could also use the achievement system. 2.6 also brought numerous fixes and improvements. After this eight patch, Egosoft released the ninth patch on 2 June, updating the game to version 2.7. This was followed on 17 June by the patch version 2.7.1, fixing several minor issues. Egosoft released the tenth patch on 7 October, updating the game to version 3.0. It brought a new plot mission called 'Balance of Power', which was specially developed as a feature for the X Superbox. Also featured in the update was a reward for the Operation Final Fury plot. Update 3.0 also featured the Dead-is-Dead gameplay mode for X3: Terran Conflict which was only available to players who played through the Steam client.

A further update was released on 12 April 2011 for the Windows version and on 24 March for the Mac OS X version. The last update was released on 19 April adding controller support and providing bugfixes.

== Digital rights management ==
Until the removal of digital rights management in the 2.5 update, X3: Terran Conflict used Tagès as copy prevention. For the DVD versions of the game, the DVD was required to be in the drive to start the game. For online distribution version of the game, including Steam, the number of installations was limited to 5 machines. More activations were available by contacting either Egosoft or Valve.

== Reception ==
X3: Terran Conflict

Aggregate scores
Aggregator	Score
GameRankings	76.69%
Metacritic	73/100

Review scores
Publication	Score
IGN	8/10
GameShark	B−
Game Vortex	95%

On release, X3: Terran Conflict was generally well received by critics, and scored very well on review aggregator websites, including a 73/100 on Metacritic, a 76.63% on GameRankings.

Allgame awarded it 3.5 out of 5 and said "X3: Terran Conflict continues German developer EgoSoft's long-running series of space combat games in which players fight, manage an intergalactic corporation, and explore the X Universe in an attempt to return home to Earth". IGN reviewed it and gave 8 out of 10 possible points.

"In X3: Terran Conflict, EgoSoft has clearly given us both. Lovingly concocted, generally well executed, and hampered only by a few niggles, this is a game that not only achieves its goal -- plunking us into another time and place to live the life of an entrepreneurial spaceman -- but shows us that some titles can truly take us places".

— IGN's Gord Goble on X3: Terran Conflict

Gord Goble's review also spoke well of the game's content, simultaneously praising the gameplay and the depiction of the life of an entrepreneurial spaceman. The game received a B− rating from GameShark, with writer Dave VanDyk saying that although the Terran Conflict has some features identical to the original game, he called it "addictive". Criticism included slow frame rate on high settings, high learning curve, inconvenient controls, lack of multiplayer, bad voice acting, and poor story, although the critics mention that the severity of most of the frustrations were noticeably reduced when compared to previous games of the X series.

== See also ==
- List of PC games
