= Space flight simulation game =

Genre of flight simulator video games

Space flight simulation is a genre of flight simulator video games that lets players experience space flight to varying degrees of realism. Common mechanics include space exploration, space trade and space combat.

== Overview ==
Some games in the genre aim to recreate a realistic portrayal of space flight, involving the calculation of orbits within a more complete physics simulation than pseudo space flight simulators. Others focus on gameplay rather than simulating space flight in all its facets. The realism of the latter games is limited to what the game designer deems to be appropriate for the gameplay, instead of focusing on the realism of moving the spacecraft in space. Some "flight models" use a physics system based on Newtonian physics, but these are usually limited to maneuvering the craft in its direct environment, and do not take into consideration the orbital calculations that would make such a game a simulator. Many of the pseudo simulators feature faster than light travel.

Examples of true simulators which aim at piloting a space craft in a manner that conforms with the laws of nature include Orbiter, Kerbal Space Program and Microsoft Space Simulator. Examples of more fantastical video games that bend the rules of physics in favor of streamlining and entertainment, include Wing Commander, Star Wars: X-Wing and Freelancer.

The modern space flight game genre emerged at the point when home computers became sufficiently powerful to draw basic wireframe graphics in real-time. The game Elite is widely considered to be the breakthrough game of the genre, having successfully melded the "space trading" and flight sim genres. Elite was highly influential upon later games of its type, although it did have some precursors. Games similar to Elite are sometimes called "Elite-clones".

Space flight games and simulators, at one time popular, have for much of the new millennium been considered a "dead" genre. However, the early 2010s saw a temporary reversal in this trend when open-source and enthusiast communities managed to produce some working, modern titles (e.g. Orbiter Spaceflight Simulator); and 2011's commercially released Kerbal Space Program was notably well-received, even by the aerospace community. 2014 saw one of the most successful entries in this genre, most notably Elite: Dangerous, which brought new attention to the space trading and combat game subgenre, but after its release the genre returned to relative quiet.

== Subgenres ==
=== Realistic simulation ===
Realistic space simulators seek to represent a vessel's behaviour under the influence of the laws of physics. As such, the player normally concentrates on following checklists or planning tasks. Piloting is generally limited to dockings, landings or orbital maneuvers. The reward for the player is on mastering real or realistic spacecraft, celestial mechanics and astronautics.

Classical games with this approach include Space Shuttle: A Journey into Space (1982), Rendezvous: A Space Shuttle Simulation (1982), The Halley Project (1985), Shuttle (1992) and Microsoft Space Simulator (1994).

If the definition is expanded to include decision making and planning, then Buzz Aldrin's Race Into Space (1992) is also notable for historical accuracy and detail. In this game, the player takes the role of Administrator of NASA or Head of the Soviet Space Program with the ultimate goal of being the first side to conduct a successful human Moon landing.

Orbiter and, to an extent, Space Shuttle Mission 2007, provide more elaborate simulations. They have 3D virtual cockpits and external views. Orbiter has been continually developed into modern times including having modern graphics, while others above have not been.

FlightGear is used professionally in aerospace engineering and research, with a flight dynamics engine (JSBSim) that is used in a 2015 NASA benchmark to judge new simulation code to the standards of the space industry. FlightGear simulates orbital and atmospheric flight, but as of 2021 does not cover flight between planets (although its flight dynamics engine supports Mars and has been used to model the NASA ARES glider). FlightGear is free and open-source, and it can accurately handle speeds from subsonic, transonic, through to high hypersonic or re-entry regimes with a flight dynamics engine that can incorporate windtunnel data or computational fluid dynamics, and uses a 3D model of gravity used for spaceflight based on spherical harmonics which can simulate the twisting force caused by gravity varying over a craft. It has an accurate celestial simulation that also feeds star tracker instruments for navigation. Being modern, FlightGear has realistic graphics and an orbital renderer that can handle calculations of light scattering and auroral emission with huge distances involved, and has the ability to accelerate time. Of particular note is FlightGear's Space Shuttle project, whose simulation is backed by NASA windtunnel data and is one of the most detailed and accurate simulation outside of NASA's internal ones.

Kerbal Space Program can be considered a space simulator, even though it portrays an imaginary universe with tweaked physics, masses and distances to enhance gameplay. Nevertheless, the physics and rocket design principles are much more realistic than in the space combat or trading subgenres. Mods for the game such as Real Solar System, Realism Overhaul, Principia, FAR and Kerbalism can be installed to add more realism to the game as well as adding more realistic rocket engines, radiation, life support and other elements to make the game more realistic. Whilst the original graphics remain dated, several user-made mods have dramatically increased fidelity of the visuals. Some examples include, Scatterer, Firefly, Environmental Visual Enhancements, Waterfall, and Parallax Continued.

The game Lunar Flight (2012) simulates flying around the lunar surface in a craft resembling the Apollo Lunar Module, while Perilune (2019) is an example of a lunar landing simulation with realistic physics designed for Android mobile devices.

The game/program SpaceEngine includes a realistic space flight simulator within its full scale representation of the universe (including both real and procedurally generated astronomical objects), utilizing realistic orbital mechanics and an atmospheric model for certain flyable shuttles. It also includes interstellar travel using the hypothetical Alcubierre drive, but this is implemented in a realistic method to complement the more realistic elements of the game.

=== Space combat game ===
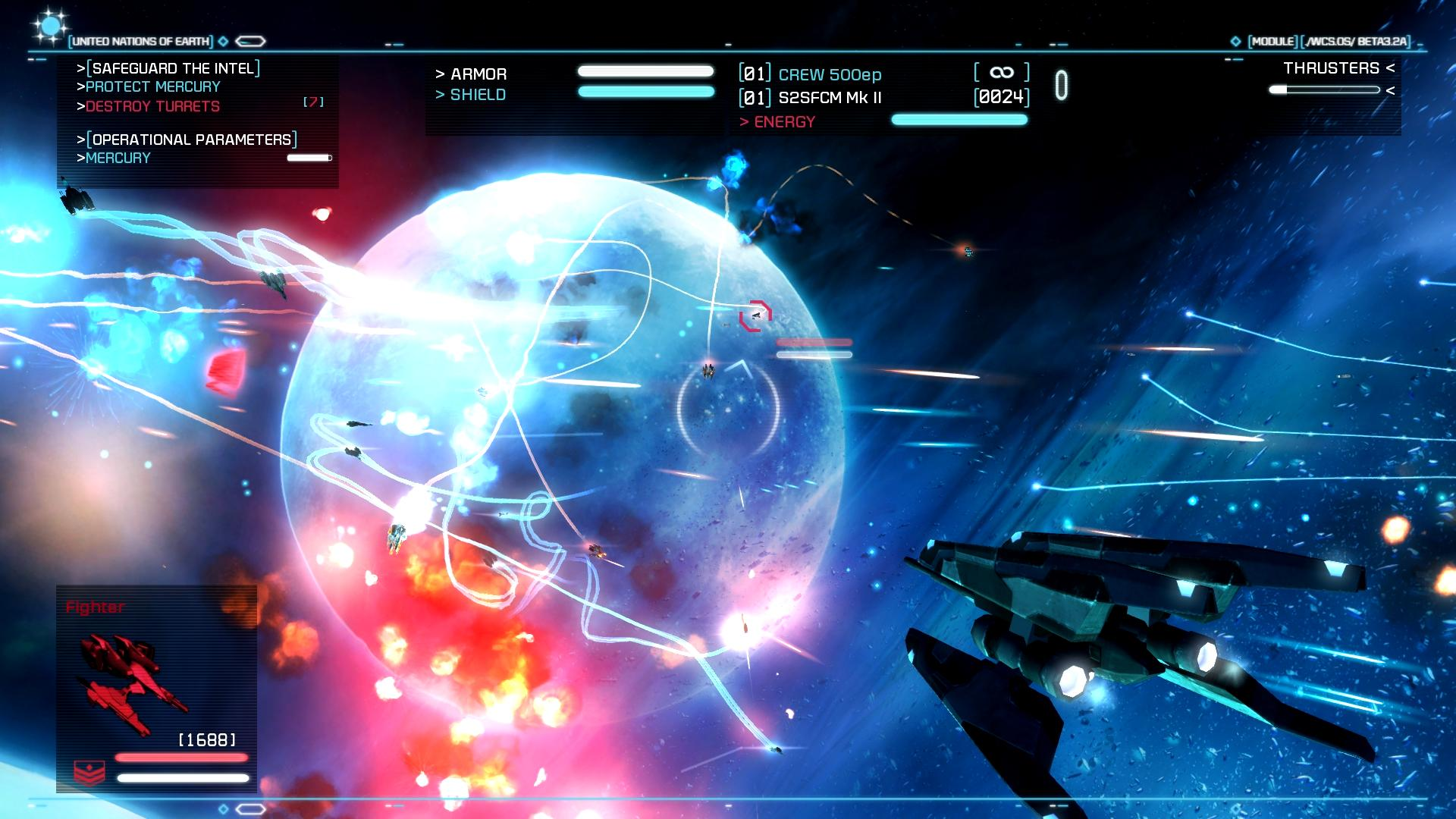
Strike Suit Zero is a space flight combat game released in 2013.

Most games in the space combat genre feature futuristic scenarios involving space flight and extraplanetary combat. Such games generally place the player into the controls of a small starfighter or smaller starship in a military force of similar and larger spaceships and do not take into account the physics of space flight, often citing some technological advancement to explain the lack thereof. The prominent Wing Commander, X-Wing and Freespace series all use this approach. Exceptions include Independence War, Independence War 2 and the Star Trek: Bridge Commander series, which model craft at a larger scale and/or in a more strategic fashion. I-War also features Newtonian style physics for the behaviour of the spacecraft, but not orbital mechanics.

Space combat games tend to be mission-based, as opposed to the more open-ended nature of space trading and combat games.

=== Space trading and combat game ===
The general formula for the space trading and combat game, which has changed little since its genesis, is for the player to begin in a relatively small, outdated ship with little money or status and for the player to gain in status and power through trading, exploration, combat or a mix of different methods. The ship the player controls is generally larger than that in pure space combat simulator. Notable examples of the genre include Elite, the X series, Wing Commander: Privateer, Freelancer, and No Man's Sky.

In some instances, plot plays only a limited role and only a loose narrative framework tends to be provided. In certain titles of the X series, for instance, players may ignore the plot for as long as they wish and are even given the option to disable the plot completely and instead play in sandbox mode. Many games of this genre place a strong emphasis on factional conflict, leading to many small mission-driven subplots that unravel the tensions of the galaxy.

Games of this type often allow the player to choose among multiple roles to play and multiple paths to victory. This aspect of the genre is very popular, but some people have complained that, in some titles, the leeway given to the player too often is only superficial, and that, in reality, the roles offered to players are very similar, and open-ended play too frequently restricted by scripted sequences. As an example, Freelancer has been in one reviewer's opinion critiqued as being rigid in its narrative structure, being in one case compared negatively with Grand Theft Auto, another series praised for its open-ended play.

All space trading and combat games feature the core gameplay elements of directly controlling the flight of some sort of space vessel, generally armed, and of navigating from one area to another for a variety of reasons. As technology has improved it has been possible to implement a number of extensions to gameplay, such as dynamic economies and cooperative online play. Overall, however, the core gameplay mechanics of the genre have changed little over the years.

Besides the array of space-themed trade and combat games, there also exist a small number of games with similar mechanics, but with a less traditional historical setting. These include the Sid Meier's Pirates! and Mount and Blade franchises.

Some more recent games, such as 2003's EVE Online, have expanded the scope of the experience by including thousands of simultaneous online players in what is sometimes referred to as a "living universe" – a dream some have held since the genre's early beginnings. Also with massive battles, Star Citizen, a title in development by Cloud Imperium Games (headed by Chris Roberts, who was involved in Freelancer and Wing Commander), aims to bridge the gap between the EVE-like living universe game and the fast action of other games in the genre.

An additional sub-class of space trading games eliminate combat entirely, focusing instead entirely on trading and economic manipulation in order to achieve success.

== Control systems ==
=== Video games ===
Most modern space flight games on the personal computer allow a player to utilise a combination of the WASD keys of the keyboard and mouse as a means of controlling the game (games such as Microsoft's Freelancer use this control system exclusively). By far the most popular control system among genre enthusiasts, however, is the joystick. Most fans prefer to use this input method whenever possible, but expense and practicality mean that many are forced to use the keyboard and mouse combination (or gamepad if such is the case). The lack of uptake among the majority of modern gamers has also made joysticks a sort of anachronism, though some new controller designs and simplification of controls offer the promise that space sims may be playable in their full capacity on gaming consoles at some time in the future. In fact, X3: Reunion, sometimes considered one of the more cumbersome and difficult series to master within the trading and combat genre, was initially planned for the Xbox but later cancelled.

=== Realistic simulators ===
Realistic simulators feature spacecraft systems and instrument simulation, using a combination of extensive keyboard shortcuts and mouse clicks on virtual instrument panels. Most of the maneuvers and operations consist of setting certain systems into the desired configuration, or in setting autopilots. Real time hands on piloting can happen, depending on the simulated spacecraft. For example, it is common to use a joystick analog control to land a Space Shuttle (or any other spaceplane) or the Apollo Lunar Module (or similar landers). Dockings can be performed more precisely using the numerical keypad. Overall, the simulations have more complex control systems than game, with the limit being the physical reproduction of the actual simulated spacecraft (see Simulation cockpit).

== History ==
Early attempts at 3D space simulation date back as far as 1974's Spasim, an online multi-player space simulator in which players attempt to destroy each other's ships. The earliest known space trader dates to 1974's Star Trader, a game where the entire interface was text-only and included a star map with multiple ports buying and selling 6 commodities. It was written in BASIC.

=== Star Raiders ===
Star Raiders was introduced in 1980 for the then-new Atari 8-bit computers and became the killer app for the system. Doug Neubauer created the game as a combination of Star Wars and the text-based Star Trek mainframe game. Using smoothly scaled 2D sprites and 3D particles to mimic a first person view of a volume of space, Star Raiders simulates clearing sectors of enemy ships while managing resources and damage to the ship's different systems. In addition to forward and rear views from the ship, the game provides both a galactic map and sector scanner to show enemy and friendly starbase locations. The game does not pause while these displays are active; they keep updating in real-time.

It is one of the games that inspired Elite and the Wing Commander series. It also resulted in direct clones, including Space Spartans for Intellivision and Starmaster for the Atari 2600, both from 1982.

=== Elite ===
Elite, released in 1984, was one of the first home titles to feature fully three-dimensional graphics.

Elite has made a lasting impression on developers, worldwide, extending even into different genres. In interviews, senior producers of CCP Games cited Elite as one of the inspirations for their acclaimed MMORPG EVE Online. Þórólfur Beck, CCP's co-founder, credits Elite as the game that impacted him most on the Commodore 64. Developers of Jumpgate Evolution, Battlecruiser 3000AD, Infinity: The Quest for Earth, Hard Truck: Apocalyptic Wars and Flatspace likewise all claim Elite as a source of inspiration.

Elite was named one of the sixteen most influential games in history at Telespiele, a German technology and games trade show, and is being exhibited at such places as the London Science Museum in the "Game On" exhibition organized and toured by the Barbican Art Gallery. Elite was also named #12 on IGN's 2000 "Top 25 PC Games of All Time" list, the #3 most influential video game ever by the Times Online in 2007, and "best game ever" for the BBC Micro by Beebug Magazine in 1984. Elite's sequel, Frontier: Elite II, was named #77 on PC Zone's "101 Best PC Games Ever" list in 2007. Similar praise has been bestowed elsewhere in the media from time to time.

Elite is one of the most popularly requested games to be remade, and fans argue that it is still the best example of the genre to date, with more recent titles—including its sequels—not rising up to its level. It has been credited as opening the door for future online persistent worlds, such as Second Life and World of Warcraft, and as being the first truly open-ended game. It is to this day one of the most storage compact games ever made, residing in only 22 kilobytes of memory and on a single floppy disk. The latest incarnation of the franchise, titled Elite: Dangerous, was released on 16 December 2014, following a successful Kickstarter campaign.

=== Trade Wars ===
Though not as well known as Elite, Trade Wars is noteworthy as the first multiplayer space trader. A BBS door, Trade Wars was released in 1984 as an entirely different branch of the space trader tree, having been inspired by Hunt the Wumpus, the board game Risk, and the original space trader, Star Trader. As a pure space trader, Trade Wars lacked any space flight simulator elements, instead featuring abstract open world trading and combat set in an outer space populated by both human and NPC opponents. In 2009, it was named the #10 best PC game by PC World Magazine.

=== Other early examples ===
Other notable early examples include Space Shuttle: A Journey into Space (1982), Rendezvous: A Space Shuttle Simulation (1982), and Star Trek: Strategic Operations Simulator (1982), which featured five different controls to learn, six different enemies, and 40 different simulation levels of play, making it one of the most elaborate vector games ever released. Other early examples include Nasir Gebelli's 1982 Apple II computer games Horizon V which featured an early radar mechanic and Zenith which allowed the player ship to rotate, and Ginga Hyoryu Vifam, which allowed first-person open space exploration with a radar displaying the destination and player/enemy positions as well as an early physics engine where approaching a planet's gravitational field pulls the player towards it. Following Elite were games such as The Halley Project (1985), Echelon (1987) and Microsoft Space Simulator (1994). Star Luster, released for the NES console and arcades in 1985, featured a cockpit view, a radar displaying enemy and base locations, the ability to warp anywhere, and a date system keeping track of the current date.

Another notable Apple II game by developer FTL Games was SunDog: Frozen Legacy (1984) which allowed the player to fly through many systems, choose multiple planets to land on in several of those systems, and even walk around on the surface within the cities. Many other space sim games have allowed the player to exit their ship on planets, but the "walking" is just clicking on a location such as "Bar," "Ship Dealer," etc. The game also featured a unique story line involving cryogenics. SunDog: Frozen Legacy was also released on the Atari ST in 1985.

Some tabletop and board games, such as Traveller or Merchant of Venus, also feature themes of space combat and trade. Traveller influenced the development of Elite (the main character in Traveller is named "Jamison"; the main character in Elite is named "Jameson") and Jumpgate Evolution.

=== Wing Commander ===
The Wing Commander (1990–2007) series from Origin Systems, Inc. was a marked departure from the standard formula up to that point, bringing space combat to a level approaching the Star Wars films. Set beginning in the year 2654, and characterized by designer Chris Roberts as "World War II in space", it features a multinational cast of pilots from the "Terran Confederation" flying missions against the predatory, aggressive Kilrathi, a feline warrior race (heavily inspired by the Kzinti of Larry Niven's Known Space universe). Wing Commander (1990) was a best seller and caused the development of competing space combat games, such as LucasArts' X-Wing. Wing Commander eventually became a media franchise consisting of space combat simulation video games, an animated television series, a feature film, a collectible card game, a series of novels, and action figures.

Game designer Chris Crawford said in an interview that Wing Commander "raised the bar for the whole industry", as the game was five times more expensive to create than most of its contemporaries. Because the game was highly successful, other publishers had to match its production value in order to compete. This forced a large portion of the video game industry to become more conservative, as big-budget games need to be an assured hit for it to be profitable in any way. Crawford opined that Wing Commander in particular affected the marketing and economics of computer games and reestablished the "action game" as the most lucrative type of computer game.

=== Decline ===
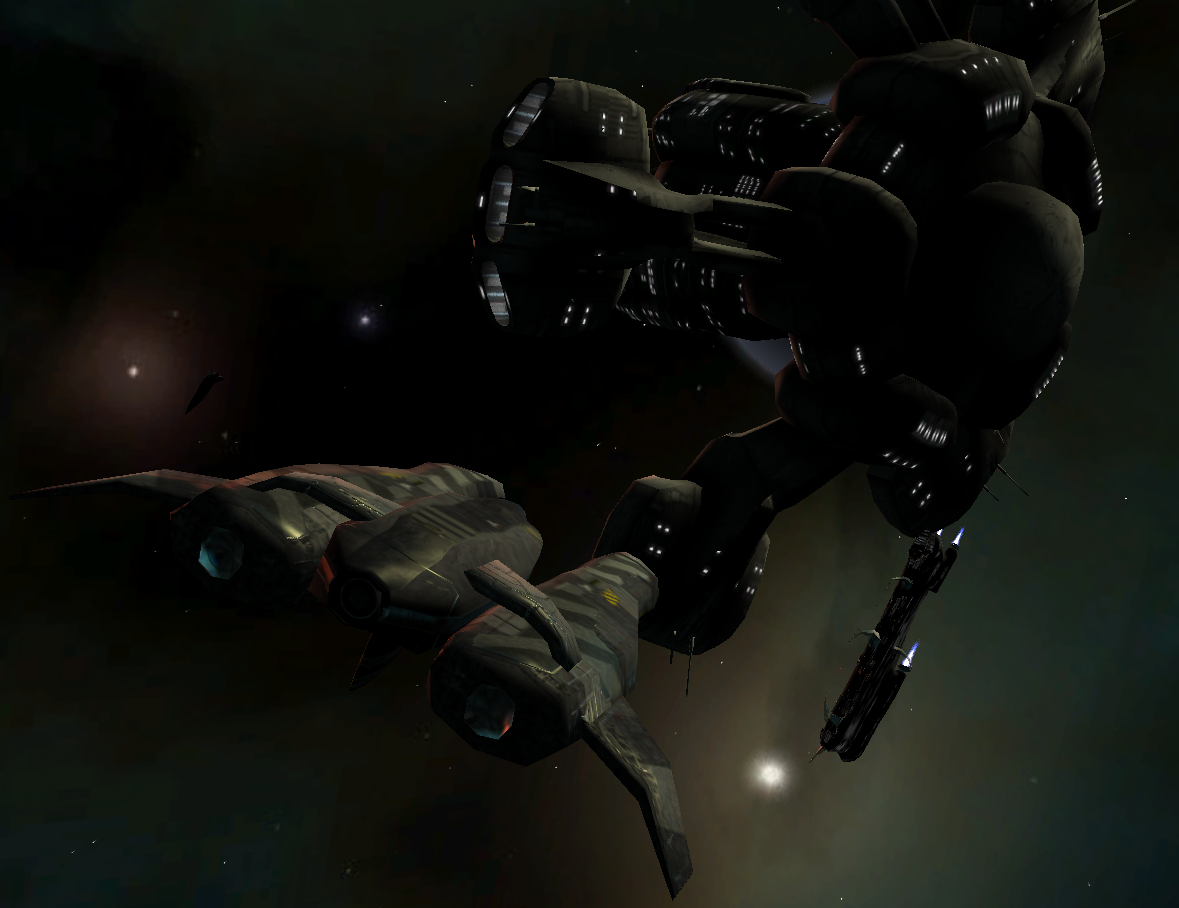
Vega Strike, a space flight simulator game: a Llama class ship docks on a mine base (2008)

The seeming decline of the space flight simulators and games in the late 1990s also coincided with the rise of the RTS, FPS and RPG game genres, with such examples as Warcraft, Doom and Diablo. The very things that made these games classics, such as their open-endedness, complex control systems and attention to detail, have been cited as reasons for their decline. It was believed that no major new space sim series would be produced as long as the genre relied on complex control systems such as the keyboard and joystick. There were outliers, however, such as the X series (1999–2018) and Eve Online.

=== Resurgence (Early 2010s) ===
Crowdfunding was a good source for space sims in early 2010s, however. In November 2012 Star Citizen set a new record, managing to raise more than $114 million as of May 2016, and is still under development. Elite: Dangerous was also successfully crowdfunded on Kickstarter in November and December 2012. The game was completed and released in 2014, and expansions are being released in stages, or "seasons". Born Ready Games also closed a successful Kickstarter campaign at the end of 2012, having raised nearly $180,000 to assist with the completion of Strike Suit Zero. The game was completed and released in January 2013. Lastly, the non-linear roguelike-like space shooter Everspace garnered almost $250,000 on Kickstarter, was released in May 2017.

The open source community has also been active, with projects such as FS2 Open and Vega Strike serving as platforms for non-professional efforts. Unofficial remakes of Elite and Privateer are being developed using the Vega Strike engine, and the latter has reached the stage where it is offered as a working title to the public. In 2013 a hobbyist space flight simulator project was realized under usage of the open source Pioneer software. After 2014, the genre saw another extended period without any notable or successful releases, as of 2026.

== See also ==
- List of observatory software
- List of space flight simulation games
- Planetarium software
- Space travel in science fiction
