= New York v. Trump =

New York v. Trump may refer to:

- New York v. Trump (DACA), a 2017 federal civil suit challenging child migrant detention
- People of New York v. Trump et al, a 2022 state civil suit regarding real estate fraud
- People of New York v. Trump, a 2023 state criminal case on unlawful payments
- The People of the State of New York v. The Trump Corporation, a 2021 state criminal tax fraud case against The Trump Organization and its chief financial officer, Allen Weisselberg

== See also ==
- New York investigations of The Trump Organization
- Trump v. New York, a 2020 federal lawsuit over the handling of the 2020 U.S. census
