= Reactions to the prosecution of Donald Trump in New York =

Responses to US state criminal case

This article lists reactions to the prosecution of Donald Trump in New York on 34 felony charges of falsifying business records of a hush money payment relating to the Stormy Daniels–Donald Trump scandal. Trump was convicted on all charges on May 30, 2024. The conviction is the first for a former U.S. president.

Neither the indictment nor the conviction disqualified Donald Trump's candidacy in the 2024 presidential election. His potential physical confinement in prison would have hampered him from performing duties such as traveling and handling classified documents.

== Before the indictment ==
In early 2023, while an indictment was widely anticipated, it remained publicly unknown when the Manhattan grand jury would finally decide whether to indict. On March 18, Donald Trump wrote on Truth Social that he would be arrested on March 21 and called for protests to "take our nation back!" Time magazine reported that prominent supporters and far-right groups who responded to his call in the January 6 U.S. Capitol attack were reluctant. A demonstration was held by the New York Young Republican Club on March 20, though the presence of journalists vastly outnumbered it.

On March 22, 2023, a post was made on Trump's Truth Social account featuring two side-by-side images; one image showed Trump with a baseball bat, and the other image showed prosecutor Alvin Bragg. The post was eventually deleted, with Trump explaining in an interview that the post shared an article by the National File, a right-wing blog, that had those side-by-side images, which was why the images appeared in his Truth Social post.

On March 23, 2023, Trump wrote on Truth Social that "potential death & destruction in such a false charge [of himself] could be catastrophic" for America, and that only an America-hating "degenerate psychopath" would charge him. He also called District Attorney Bragg an "animal", which many have said has racist overtones.

Judge Merchan has received death threats and the Manhattan courthouse has been inundated with harassing calls and emails to Merchan's courthouse chambers.

== During pretrial proceedings ==
=== Public opinion ===
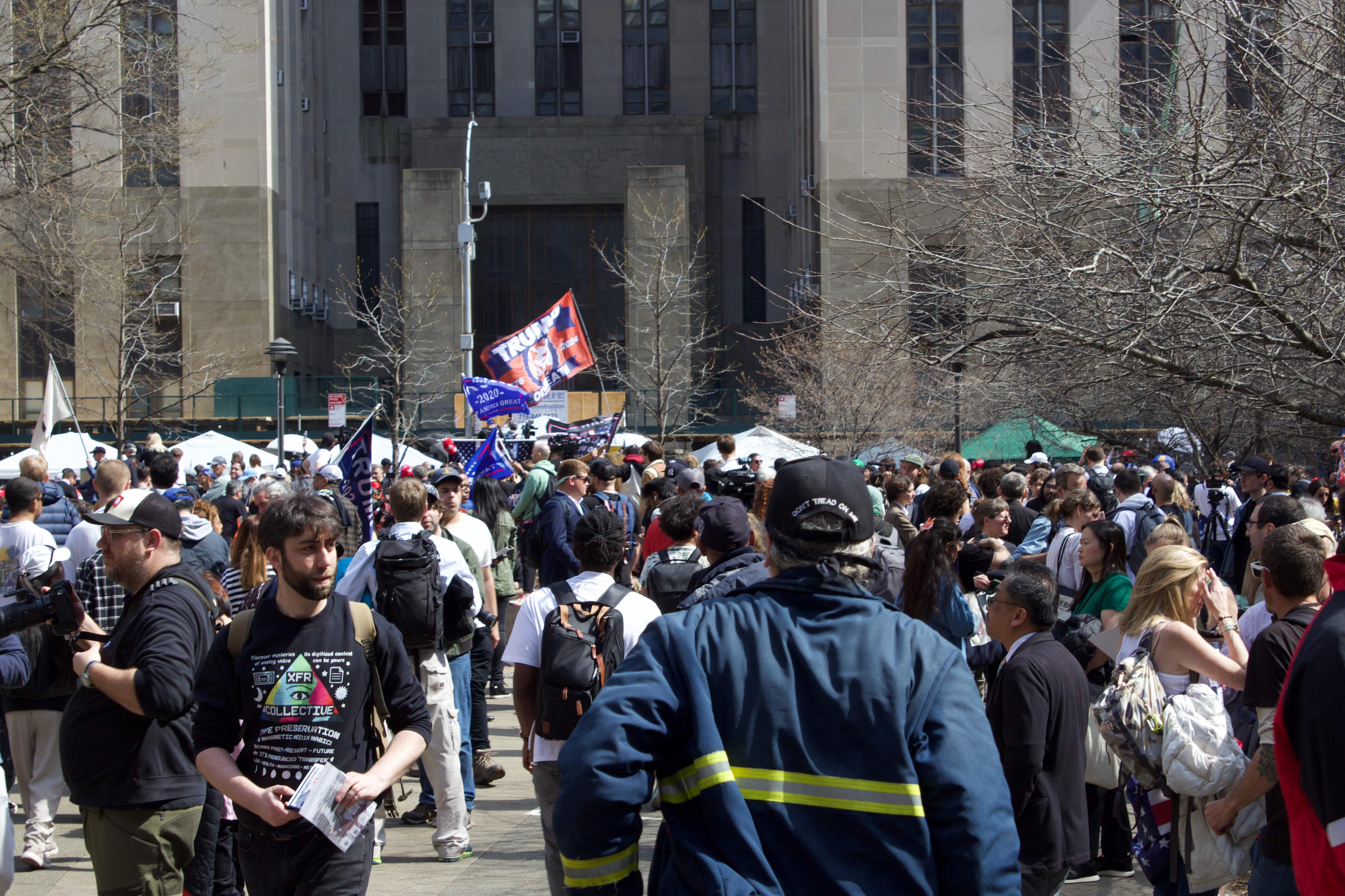
Scene at Collect Pond, opposite the courthouse, on April 4

Following the March 30, 2023, indictment, an ABC News/Ipsos poll conducted from March 31 to April 1, 2023, showed a plurality of Americans believed Trump should be charged, with 45% of voters believing Trump should be charged, 32% believing he should not, and 23% saying that they "don't know". The poll was split along party lines, with 88% of Democrats and 16% of Republicans believing Trump should be charged.

A CNN poll conducted from March 31 to April 1 found that 60% of Americans approved of the indictment, but that 76% of Americans believed that "politics played at least some role in the decision to indict Trump."

ABC News/Ipsos conducted a second poll from April 6 to April 7, 2023, showing a 5-point increase to 50% among Americans who believed Trump should be charged, of which this view among Americans with no party preference rose to 54% from 40%. Meanwhile, 53% of Americans believed Trump intentionally did something illegal. The poll was again split along party lines, with 87% of Democrats, 57% of Independents, and 19% of Republicans in favor of the indictment.

=== Republicans ===
==== Donald Trump ====
The timing of the March 30 indictment reportedly surprised Trump and his team, who learned about it from the news. His attorneys had believed it was still weeks away and had expected the district attorney's office to inform them directly.

Trump attributed his indictment to political persecution and election interference, among other things. He sent emails to his supporters asking for donations to "defend our movement from the never-ending witch hunts" and wrote that donations would have a "1,500% impact". The 2024 Trump campaign stated that it received over $4 million in donations in the 24 hours after the indictment was announced, and $7 million within three days.

The day after Trump was indicted, he criticized Judge Merchan. He claimed that Merchan "hates" him and treated his companies "viciously" in a related case, and that he "strong armed" Trump Organization chief financial officer Allen Weisselberg into accepting a plea deal, though Weisselberg had reached the deal with prosecutors and his own lawyers and Merchan only approved it. Trump also claimed that Merchan had been "hand picked by Bragg & the prosecutors" although judges are randomly assigned and prosecutors had no role in Merchan's assignment. After the indictment, Trump and a small number of allies in the GOP advocated cutting funds for the U.S. Department of Justice and the Federal Bureau of Investigation, with Trump saying in his social media platform that the law enforcement were weaponized by the Democrats.

On April 12, 2023, citing the criminal case, Trump sued his former lawyer Michael Cohen for allegedly revealing his confidences and "spreading falsehoods" about him. On April 23, 2023, Trump praised Republicans who had supported him amid two impeachments and the criminal proceedings, contrasting this against the widely negative perception of Richard Nixon during the Watergate scandal. (Note: Congress dropped its impeachment proceedings against Richard Nixon after he resigned in August 1974 and he was pardoned the next month for any crimes he may have committed while in office.)

On February 15, 2024, Trump told reporters, without naming any specific legal scholar, that "Virtually every legal scholar says they don't understand it [charges], that there's no crime. Even if he [Trump] was guilty of something, there's no crime."

==== Members of Congress ====
Congressional Republicans generally condemned the indictment as unprecedented and a weaponization of justice. Some alleged the indictment constituted election interference, as Trump was an announced candidate in the November 2024 presidential election.

On March 19, 2023, Kevin McCarthy, then Speaker of the House, discouraged protests if Trump is indicted, asserting that not even Trump wanted them. (Note: By late March, McCarthy said he would use congressional power to probe Bragg.) On March 30, McCarthy tweeted: "Alvin Bragg has irreparably damaged our country in an attempt to interfere in our Presidential election. As he routinely frees violent criminals to terrorize the public, he weaponized our sacred system of justice against President Donald Trump. The American people will not tolerate this injustice, and the House of Representatives will hold Alvin Bragg and his unprecedented abuse of power to account."

When Senator Lindsey Graham was interviewed by Fox News, he stated that "you need to help this man, Donald J. Trump. They're trying to drain him dry ... Go to DonaldJTrump.com and give money so he can defend himself."

On March 20, 2023, Republicans Jim Jordan, James Comer and Bryan Steil, chairs of the House Judiciary, Oversight and Administration committees, respectively, sent Bragg a letter calling for him to testify before their committees, and to provide communications, documents and testimony about the inquiry, calling the upcoming indictment an "unprecedented abuse of prosecutorial authority." Later they told Bragg they might consider legislation "to protect former and/or current Presidents from politically motivated prosecutions by state and local officials." Bragg's office wrote back that the requests were an "unlawful incursion into New York's sovereignty," noting such information about ongoing investigations was confidential under state law. Jordan in February 2023 had received a private request from Trump's lawyer Joe Tacopina to investigate Bragg for his actions against Trump, according to The New York Times and CNN. Representative Elise Stefanik, the House Republican Conference chair, has been briefing Trump on House Republicans' committee work, including the House committees' plans to respond to Bragg, according to CNN on March 28. On April 11, Bragg sued Jordan in federal court, alleging that Jordan was trying to "intimidate and attack" him.

Trump-aligned Representative Marjorie Taylor Greene, a member of the House Oversight Committee, has acknowledged informing Trump of "everything that we're doing ... He seems very plugged in at all times. Sometimes I'm shocked at how he knows all these things." Greene cautioned against protests against Trump's potential indictment, warning of a repeat of the January 6 United States Capitol attack; but reversed this stance after the charges were actually made. (Note: On April 2, a lone Trump supporter near Trump Tower stated that "We're not showing up here by ourselves," contending (as a conspiracy theory alleges) that the January 6 attack was orchestrated by leftist organizations such as Antifa.)

On April 7, Bennie Thompson stated "They have a fundamental right to defend that individual [Trump], and that's what they're doing. My concern is, in defense of it, they're attacking the rule of law, and the rule of law in this country is clear. We have separation of powers in our Constitution."

The five GOP senators who had endorsed Trump's campaign said that his indictment would not alter their support for him.

==== Other presidential candidates ====
Many of Trump's political rivals, such as entrepreneur Vivek Ramaswamy and former Governor of South Carolina Nikki Haley, who were at the time running for the presidential nomination, expressed opposition to the indictment. Former vice president Mike Pence called the indictment an outrage and a "political prosecution". Former governor and prosecutor Chris Christie condemned Trump's conduct but said that the case was weak and should not have been brought; Christie has endorsed Jack Smith's prosecution of Donald Trump.

Former Governor of Arkansas and potential contender for the presidency Asa Hutchinson argued for supporting the legal process, but he also said that he hoped voters would still be able to decide for themselves if Trump should be elected. In mid-March 2023, Hutchinson argued that if indicted, Trump should withdraw his candidacy "out of respect for the institution of the presidency", not because it would be judicially damning but because it would distract from the election.

Ron DeSantis, the governor of Florida, the state in which Trump resides, said that the state of Florida would not assist with any extradition of Trump to New York. However, under the Extradition Clause of Article IV of the U.S. Constitution, governors cannot reject the extradition requests of other states, and the U.S. Supreme Court ruled in Puerto Rico v. Branstad (1987) that federal courts can enforce this provision if needed.

==== Others ====
Former national security advisor under Trump John Bolton stated that he hoped the New York prosecutors were "very, very certain of their case" because if they indicted but did not convict Trump, it would bolster his campaign.

William Barr, former Attorney General under Trump, gave his opinion that the Democratic strategists know this case will help Trump and they want him to be the Republican nominee because he is the "weakest of the Republican candidates," and predicted that he would be defeated by Biden in the 2024 presidential election. Barr also considers that this case lacks merit, calling it "transparently an abuse of prosecutorial power to accomplish a political end and ... an unjust case."

The Heritage Foundation filed two lawsuits asserting that Bragg failed to comply with freedom of information requests regarding his reputed communications with the Justice Department, the Biden administration, and/or Democratic lawmakers.

In September 2023, Russian President Vladimir Putin said the trial "shows the rottenness of the American political system, which cannot pretend to teach others democracy" and "Everything that is happening with Trump is the persecution of a political rival for political reasons. That's what it is. And this is being done in front of the public of the United States and the whole world."

On March 17, 2024 Juan Merchan, the New York Supreme Court judge presiding over the case, gave a statement to the Associated Press noting that preparation was "intense" and that he was striving "to make sure that I've done everything I could to be prepared and to make sure that we dispense justice. There's no agenda here. We want to follow the law. We want justice to be done. That's all we want." The anodyne statement resulted in an unsuccessful recusal motion by the defense.

On March 24, 2024, Trump spokesperson Steven Cheung stated that a conviction would not impact Trump's right to vote stating: "These 'legal experts' clearly received their law degrees from fictional institutions because they currently live in a fantasy land devoid of reality" stating detractors suffered from "Trump Derangement Syndrome."

=== Democrats ===
Democratic Representative Adam Schiff tweeted: "The indictment of a former president is unprecedented. But so too is the unlawful conduct in which Trump has been engaged." Schiff served as the lead impeachment manager during Trump's first impeachment trial. The Biden administration said they would not take part in the public discussion. Democrats have billed the indictment as Trump being held accountable under the law. Democratic Representative Jamaal Bowman shouted "Get the hell out of here!" at Republican Representative Marjorie Taylor Greene for supporting Trump during a Trump protest in New York City.

In tandem to the proceedings, on March 22 the New York Senate passed a bill aiming to exclude the terms of a U.S. president from the time counted by statutes of limitations, as presidential immunity could potentially be used to evade prosecution.

=== Legal experts ===
The indictment raises novel and complex legal issues. Legal experts contacted by the New York Times said that the indictment combines business records charges with state election law in a way that had never previously been done in a case involving a federal campaign. According to the Associated Press, the indictment involves difficult legal issues which the defense might be able to use to get it dismissed. Law professor Richard Hasen described the ongoing federal investigations into Trump as "much stronger both legally and factually" than this case.

While the indictment has been published, it does not reveal the District Attorney's "specific legal theory" behind the case; for example, it is not specific about "how each of the charges was elevated to a felony", nor does it "specify the potential underlying crimes". While the law does not require such specificity, attorney Ken White and law professor Richard Klein have commented that this makes it difficult to assess the legal merits of the case.

In February 2024, the New York Daily News carried an opinion piece by Nick Akerman, former assistant U.S. attorney for the Southern District of New York and assistant special Watergate prosecutor, who commented on the similarities with the Watergate case, and stated that Trump was facing almost certain conviction.

On March 28, 2024, US District Judge Reggie Walton said that Trump's social media attacks on Merchan's daughter were "very troubling" but that Merchan was correct not to use his gag order on Trump to protect himself and his family.

Legal analyst Glenn Kirschner argued that Trump had broken state law by attempting to obstruct the DA's official duties. Writing for MSNBC on April 10, former U.S. attorney Barbara McQuade defended Bragg's probe, stating: "white-collar crime is more egregious than crime committed by destitute people desperate for cash".

Some have argued that irrespective of charges in the hush-money scandal, Trump was equally or more seriously threatened by E. Jean Carroll's lawsuits against him (one of which he lost in May 2023, the other in January 2024, both under appeal), (Note: The day of Trump's arraignment, although his DNA was not collected, Forbes speculated that it might be accessible to Carroll's team (though inadmissible at her April 25 trial). The Daily Show guest host Roy Wood Jr. joked that a DNA sample from Trump is "kind of how he got into this mess in the first place", alluding to his alleged affair with Daniels, and said his DNA could likely "solve a bunch of cold cases from the '80s!") Jack Smith's special counsel investigation into both Trump's alleged mishandling of classified government records (for which he was indicted in June 2023) and the January 6 attack (leading to his indictment in August), the 2020 Georgia election investigation (for which he was indicted later in August), and the New York AG's civil investigation of the Trump Organization. Amid Trump's arrest, a number of media outlets pointed out that his father, Fred, was arrested twice (in 1927 and 1976). As it became clear that the matter would likely be the first criminal case against a former U.S. president to go to trial, some legal experts argued that—though the truthfulness of the allegations had apparently been established—the case was the weakest of the four then under litigation.

In March 2023, a former Federal Election Commission (FEC) commissioner argued that it was not the province of the Manhattan DA to prosecute a federal campaign finance violation (which the "nuisance settlement" payment arguably did not constitute), and was instead the jurisdiction of the FEC or the Justice Department (which both reputedly knew of Trump's alleged misdeeds but chose not to prosecute him).

Jennifer Rubin argued that the GOP might rather lose the 2024 general election than denounce Trump. George Conway used the occasion to suggest that Trump's best (albeit unlikely) defense could be insanity.

=== Media commentary ===
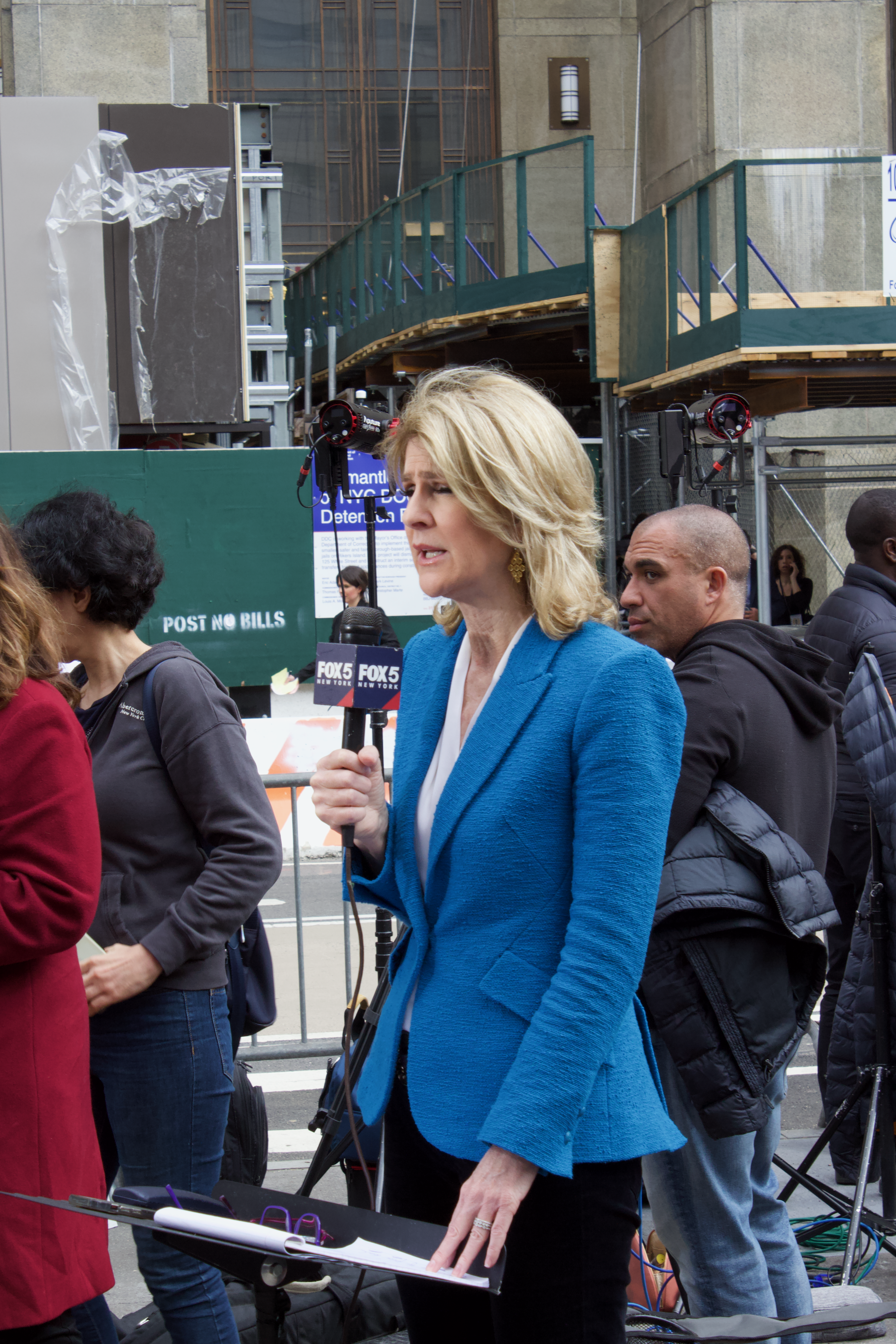
Linda Schmidt of Fox 5 New York among a crowd of press reporting live outside the courthouse where Trump was arraigned

The Financial Times's Edward Luce expressed disappointment that this indictment came before the conclusion of the Smith special counsel investigation, and described the indictment as a legal technicality that is neither as serious nor as "easy to intuit" as the allegations concerning sedition and attempts to overturn the 2020 presidential election. The Financial Times's Joshua Chaffin said skeptics could compare the case to a similar one involving presidential candidate John Edwards, who obtained a mistrial after arguing that his payments were not intended to influence the election, but to protect his dying wife.

The Guardian's David Smith wrote that Trump has been adept at turning around allegations and playing the victim, and that his tactics will work with his base. Current and former Fox News hosts, including Sean Hannity, Glenn Beck, and Tucker Carlson, expressed outrage and concern over the indictment. Trump's indictment came following the release of text messages from several Fox News hosts denouncing Trump in Dominion Voting Systems v. Fox News.

NBC New York compared Trump's rhetoric in his calls for protests to that which he used before the insurrection. Two New York tabloids with typically opposite political leanings, the Daily News and the Post, condemned Trump's rhetoric in calling for protest as "dangerous" and "crazy", respectively. Comedian and political commentator Jon Stewart stated that "The rule of law does not take into account if [an indictment] might make you a martyr to somebody." The New York Times wrote that the case has demonstrated both "Bragg's skills and shortcomings as [DA] ... [namely] a keen eye for legal strategy but something of a blind spot for the way his decisions are perceived by the public".

=== Misinformation and conspiracy theories ===
Before Trump's indictment, Bellingcat founder Eliot Higgins facetiously created an AI-generated image of Trump being arrested using Midjourney software and Higgins said he was banned from using Midjourney after it went viral. Higgins was clear that the images were fictitious and did not seek to distribute them widely. Nonetheless, social media users spread the images without clarifying their origin.

Once the indictment was handed down, QAnon accounts on Telegram began posting about "trusting the plan" and how "the storm is upon us", referencing conspiracy theories surrounding the "Deep State". Other conspiracy theories claimed that Bragg was "bought and paid for" by billionaire George Soros. This claim was promoted and spread by Trump himself as well as DeSantis, Senator JD Vance, Senator Ron Johnson, Texas Governor Greg Abbott, Representative Anna Paulina Luna, and Representative Paul Gosar, who called Bragg a "Soros D.A." Although Soros did donate to progressive criminal justice reform group Color of Change, which contributed to Bragg's campaign, Soros was only one of many donors to Color of Change, and he had no contact with Bragg. Threats were also directed at Soros and Bragg. Some on Trump's social media platform Truth Social called for armed defense of Mar-a-Lago, though there seemed to be no coordinated effort to do so.

Deepfake and other imagery created using artificial intelligence (AI) depicting Trump being arrested and/or perp walked circulated on social media with faux headlines, proving controversial and popular on both sides of the political spectrum, though for opposite reasons.

In March 2024, One America News Network, a far-right, pro-Trump cable channel, promoted a false story claiming that Cohen was the one who had carried out an affair with Daniels and that he had used it to "extort" the Trump Organization. The network reached a legal settlement with Cohen in April, acknowledging that the original story was false.

== During the trial ==
Commentary continued unabated during the trial.

=== Legal scholars ===
Law professor Gregory Germain wrote on May 7, that "Trump could run for and be elected president whether he's convicted and sent to jail or not." He doubted that a conviction would result in jail time, and he viewed a conviction as more likely than not if the judge gives oversimplified instructions to the jury.

Former federal prosecutor Andrew C. McCarthy wrote on May 11, about Trump's nondisclosure agreement with Daniels: "NDAs are lawful, and Trump had no legal obligation to disclose the embarrassing information the NDA concealed." McCarthy also addressed what kind of evidence is needed to prove intent: "[I]f a prosecutor seeks to criminalize a mere intention under circumstances in which there is no completed criminal act, then there is often lots of ambiguity. Ergo, the law demands strong evidence that the defendant truly intended to commit a particular kind of crime and took purposeful steps to carry it out, even if the effort was unsuccessful." In this case, according to McCarthy, the prosecutor "needs convincing evidence of Trump's knowledge of criminality and specific intent to commit it". He also asserts that Judge Merchan allowed inadmissible evidence, and mistakenly allowed a jury instruction that a person can perpetrate fraud without doing anything illegal.

On May 17, the attorney and legal commentator Elie Honig wrote that, "Judge Merchan has done an exceptional job running this trial thus far, but he's off base" in regard to the burden of proof. Merchan had said that the conflicting statements put the "jury in a position of having to choose who they believe: Donald Trump, who denies there was an encounter, or Stormy Daniels, who claims that there was." Honig says, "It's not about whether the jury believes Daniels or Trump more than the other. It's about whether the prosecution can meet its larger evidentiary burden of proof beyond a reasonable doubt."

Stacey Schneider, a criminal defense attorney, wrote for CNN on May 18 that Allen Weisselberg potentially could have "close[d] any gaps in Cohen's story" but, given that "Weisselberg also has credibility issues", he was not called to testify. Without anyone to corroborate Cohen's story, in Schneider's opinion, "Cohen's testimony only satisfied half the equation beyond a reasonable doubt."

On May 20, law professor Guha Krishnamurthi published a revised draft paper discussing the "other crime" or "predicate crime" that could hypothetically raise Trump's alleged bookkeeping misdemeanor to a felony. Krishnamurthi stated, "On the District Attorney's part, he and his prosecuting team have, to my knowledge, not yet specified with exactitude the crimes that could serve as the predicate." Therefore, Krishnamurthi suggested two predicate crimes: "First, 52 U.S.C. § 30116, combined with 52 U.S.C. § 30109(d), is one such predicate crime. Second, 52 U.S.C. § 30104, combined with 18 U.S.C. § 1001 and 18 U.S.C. § 2(b), is another such crime."

Also on May 20, law professor Bradley Smith, who is a former chairman of the Federal Election Commission (FEC), wrote about the FEC's "reporting schedules, showing that even if they thought [the hush money] was a campaign expenditure to be reported, expenditure made on October 27 (when $$ sent to Daniels atty) would not, under law, be reported until Dec. 8, a full 30 days after election". Another FEC rule requires campaigns to report contributions over $1,000 within 48 hours.

Former prosecutor Chris Timmons also weighed in on May 20, opining that the prosecution had proved what it needed to prove to obtain a conviction. But, he observed that jurors sometimes side with a defendant simply because they do not like the case.

On May 22, political operative and lawyer Lanny Davis opined that the jury "can convict Trump without believing Michael Cohen", because Cohen's testimony merely "confirms documents and corroborates the testimony of others" who were more credible than him.

On May 24, attorney and commentator Gregg Jarrett invoked the Sixth Amendment to the United States Constitution, as follows:

[W]e are no closer to understanding what underlying crime Trump supposedly committed. It's a farce. No capable or impartial judge would have permitted such an egregious violation of the Sixth Amendment. Every defendant has the fundamental right "to be informed of the nature and cause of the accusation" against him.

On May 25, law professor Jonathan Turley objected to Judge Merchan's decision that Trump can be convicted of a felony even if the 12 jurors are equally split among three different respective crimes that they think Trump intended to commit, with only four jurors believing he intended to commit each crime. Turley added: "even if Trump's legal settlement money could be viewed as a federal campaign contribution, it could not have been part of a conspiracy to influence the election since any reporting of a contribution would have had to occur after the election."

CNN legal analyst and law professor Ryan Goodman predicted on May 27 that the defense will be able to sway at least one juror, by focusing Trump's closing argument on the unreliability of Michael Cohen.

Dan McClaughlin, who was a litigator in New York City for 23 years, wrote on May 28, that, "all of the evidence about AMI should have been thrown out as irrelevant to the case because the business records at issue recorded payments from Trump to Daniels through Cohen; none of them related in any way to AMI, Pecker, or McDougal." McLaughlin also wrote that Pecker's testimony included information about a fine paid by AMI after Pecker had already left AMI, "[b]ut Pecker can't be cross-examined about something he didn't do." McClaughlin contends that this deprived Trump of his constitutional right "to be confronted with the witnesses against him."

On May 29, Andrew Weissmann, who was a top prosecutor during the investigation of whether Trump had secret links to Russia, called the current New York trial "impeccably fair", lavishing praise on Justice Merchan, and saying he had a "man crush" on Merchan.

=== Trump's out-of-court public comments ===
On April 16, countering claims that payments to Cohen were illegitimately filed as legal expenses, Trump told reporters that "I was paying a lawyer, and I marked it down as a legal expense. ... That's exactly what it was." (Note: Jeffrey McConney later acknowledged instructing Deborah Tarasoff to falsely record the reimbursement checks to Cohen (which were signed by Trump) as "legal expenses" after telling her it was part of a retainer agreement. Tarasoff acknowledged that she carried out these instructions.) On May 20, Trump seemed to contradict his earlier (and subsequent) comment by stating, "I had nothing to do with it. A bookkeeper put it down as a legal expense," and then (emphasis added), "This is why I'm here, because we called it a legal expense, a payment to a lawyer."

On May 3, Trump posted to Truth Social about the recording of him and Cohen discussing reimbursing Pecker for the payment to McDougal,

The tape played yesterday and discussed today, while good for my case, was cut off at the end, in the early stages of something very positive that I was in the midst of saying. Why was it cut off??? (Note: At the end of the recording, Trump offers to pay by "check" after Cohen rejected the president's idea to "pay with cash". Giuliani claimed that enhanced audio revealed his client to say, "don't pay with cash.")

On May 16, in the courthouse corridor, Trump quoted a supporter while complaining to reporters: "'NDAs [non-disclosure agreements] are legal and common, yet Bragg alleges Trump's was illegal.' I have the only illegal NDA." This comment was notable because Trump's lawyers had been arguing in court that Trump had been unaware that Cohen paid on his behalf to suppress the Daniels story, yet Trump's comment implies he was aware of the NDA with Daniels.

On May 24, while awaiting the conclusion of his trial, Trump blogged as follows:

[A] bookkeeper, with zero influence from or discussion with me, correctly called the payment of a Legal Expense to a lawyer - a Legal Expense. In other words, I am being prosecuted because a bookkeeper, who I had no contact with, marked down, from a dropdown menu in the ledger, a Legal Expense to a lawyer as "Legal Expense." What the hell is wrong with that? And, what else would you call it?

Trump and his allies alleged Bragg was selectively prosecuting the former president, though during Bragg's first 15 months in office he had filed 166 felony charges of falsifying business records against 34 individuals or companies.

=== Out-of-court comments by Alina Habba ===
On April 24, Trump's lawyer Alina Habba in an interview on Newsmax's Greg Kelly Reports stated that the case was politically motivated. On April 15, Habba stated that she does not attend Trump's criminal trial because she is a civil attorney. On April 16, Habba stated that Trump may be nodding off due to the excess reading in court. On April 26, Habba stated that Trump carries around reams of news articles because he "He's reading. He's educating himself, and he's educating the country on what is happening." On May 26, Trump's legal spokesperson, Alina Habba, stated that because jurors were not sequestered over Memorial Day weekend, they may have been exposed to "Trump derangement syndrome". She also stated "There are no facts that support this alleged crime. We're not even sure what the crime is. So it's a books and records issue."

=== Members of Congress ===
On May 13, JD Vance described the courthouse as "dingy" and stated "the main goal of this trial is psychological torture."

On May 14, while the trial was ongoing, House Speaker Mike Johnson stood outside the courthouse and said that the charges against Trump are "not about justice and all about politics." At the same appearance, Ohio Sen. JD Vance, North Dakota Gov. Doug Burgum, Florida Rep. Byron Donalds, and former 2024 presidential candidate Vivek Ramaswamy all made comments about the judge's daughter. In response to this, Andrew Rice remarked on MSNBC that he had observed Trump annotating the Republicans' comments during his trial the previous day. The host, Alex Wagner, said there was "a real question about whether this is legal. Part of the gag order...is that you cannot direct others to violate the gag order for you, which is clearly what's happening here."

On May 16, Florida Rep. Matt Gaetz shared to social media a photo of himself standing behind Trump at his trial. He captioned it "Standing back and standing by, Mr. President," a reference to Trump's shout-out to the Proud Boys at a presidential debate four years earlier.

On May 21, Congresswoman Elise Stefanik of New York filed an ethics complaint against Judge Merchan, alleging a conflict of interest in this case. The complaint was filed with the New York State Commission on Judicial Conduct; it alleges that his family is being directly enriched by this case, in violation of the Rules of Judicial Conduct for the New York State Unified Court System. The ethics complaint is three pages long, and is available online. Stefanik subsequently wrote to a different set of state officials on May 28, 2024, requesting an investigation of whether the selection of Merchan to handle this Trump case was truly a random selection.

=== Relatives of the principal players ===
On May 14, Stormy Daniels's husband, Barrett Blade, told CNN's Erin Burnett that they were considering leaving the country when the trial is complete, as "she wants to move past this".

On May 15, Donald Trump's niece Mary L. Trump stated that Ivanka is "a legitimately wealthy person because of the person she is married to [Jared Kushner]. She doesn't need Donald for anything. She's not going to show up in a courtroom to support him especially in a case which is so, seriously, at its base so depressingly tawdry." As for the other Trump family members, she speculated that Donald Trump felt that their presence would be "irrelevant" and thus had not requested them to appear. She stated that "It's a pretty obviously transactional family, and if they're not getting anything out of it, there's no reason for them to be there."

=== Media analysis and commentary ===
Five key issues that could determine the trial's outcome were listed by Politico on May 27:

- Business records, or just personal ones?
- Were the records actually false?
- Did Trump and Daniels have sex — and does it matter?
- Will jurors believe Michael Cohen — and does it matter?
- Did prosecutors do enough to prove a campaign link and Trump's intent?

Trump's shut-eye posture has been ridiculed by the media with monikers including "Don Snoreleone," "Donnie Nappleseed," and "Sleepy Don" (in contrast to Trump's description of Joe Biden as "Sleepy Joe").

Lawrence O'Donnell of MSNBC repeatedly gave critiques of Trump. In response, on May 7, Trump wrote "I spotted Ratings Challenged Lawrence O'Donnell, of MSDNC [sic], in the courthouse today. I haven't seem him in years. He looks like shit, a real loser!"

Protests outside the courtroom during the trial were limited.

CNN's Fareed Zakaria said, "I doubt the New York indictment would have been brought against a defendant whose name was not Donald Trump."

Matt Gertz, a senior fellow at Media Matters for America, said that conservative media such as Fox News, Newsmax and One America News Network were "running a sort of 'heads, we win; tails, you lose' play" by depicting the trial as a "witch-hunt ginned up by Joe Biden, and obviously because of that he will be found not guilty, but at the same time, they are arguing that if he is found guilty, it will be because the jury and the judge are partisan and corrupt".

=== Miscellaneous ===
Stephanie Grisham, Trump's former White House press secretary, stated on April 20, 2024: "I was actually just thinking this morning about how cold [Trump] kept complaining to be yesterday. In his normal world, someone would have jumped up and run, not walked, to get the temperature perfect for him. This entire experience must be beyond uncomfortable for him, not just the fact that it dives into such personal details, but he has absolutely no control for probably the first time since he was a young child" noting how "At Mar-a-Lago, people literally stand and applaud him just for walking into the room, and in court, he has to sit there quietly while some people talk about how much they don't like him. I can't imagine how hard it has been for him not to get up and storm out of the place like a five-year-old."

A man immolated himself outside the courthouse, on the afternoon of April 19. As the Los Angeles Times put it, he lacked "any specific grievances related to Trump or his trial."

== After the verdict ==
=== Political ===
==== Donald Trump ====
Flying an upside down U.S. flag went "mainstream" as a form of right-wing protest following the conviction.

Following the verdict, Trump, Republicans, and right-wing media were described by the Associated Press as reacting with "fury" over the verdict on a "remarkable" level, "tossing aside the usual restraints that lawmakers and political figures have observed in the past when refraining from criticism of judges and juries." Trump and several Republicans made numerous false and misleading statements, including the false claim that the trial was "rigged," or that it was "election interference" orchestrated by Joe Biden and the Democratic Party, of which there is no evidence. The false statements were met with calls for violent retribution, execution of the judge, civil war, armed insurrection and rioting by pro-Trump supporters online.

Donald Trump stated that the "country has gone to hell" as a "divided mess", and told his supporters to "fight to the end". The day after the verdict, Trump said: "You saw what happened to some of the witnesses that were on our side - they were literally crucified." In a press conference, Trump falsely claimed that Cohen got in trouble for his non-Trump related activities, that Biden was involved in his conviction and that an election expert was not allowed to testify. He also falsely claimed that New York City was experiencing "record-high violent crime" while prosecutors were focusing on him and that "the Congo" was bringing prisoners into the country.

After the trial, Trump called the trial a "disgrace", saying it was a "rigged trial by a conflicted judge who was corrupt". He had claimed that November 5, Election Day, would be the date of his "real verdict by the people" and that "this was long from over." Trump described the trial as a "sham", likened Merchan to the "devil", and subsequently self-identified as a "political prisoner." Following the conviction, the Donald Trump 2024 presidential campaign said that they raised over $53 million the following week, and subsequently warned other Republican candidates not to fund-raise off Trump's conviction. On June 6, a besieged Trump described the trial as lawfare and stated he would seek retribution through the prosecution of those involved in his trials, noting how "sometimes revenge can be justified." On January 4, 2025, six days before his sentencing hearing, Trump posted that Merchan "should be disbarred."

==== Other Republicans ====
House Committee on the Judiciary chairman Jim Jordan, representative Elise Stefanik, and representative Marjorie Taylor Greene posted a picture of an upside-down American flag. Senators Marco Rubio and Lindsey Graham referred to the verdict as a "mockery of justice". Former Republican presidential candidate and entrepreneur Vivek Ramaswamy said the verdict would backfire.

House Speaker Mike Johnson made a statement minutes after the verdict was delivered: "Today is a shameful day in American history... The weaponization of our justice system has been a hallmark of the Biden Administration, and the decision today is further evidence that Democrats will stop at nothing to silence dissent and crush their political opponents". He further stated, "Democrats cheered as they convicted the leader of the opposing party on ridiculous charges... This was a purely political exercise, not a legal one." The next day, he said: "I do believe the Supreme Court should step in."

House Majority Leader Steve Scalise publicly stated that "Extremist Democrats have undermined democracy by weaponizing the courts", betrayed the principle of blind justice, and used the court system like a "banana republic" where "Biden teamed up with heavily biased DA Alvin Bragg to go after his political opponent regardless of wrongdoing—while hardened criminals are set free in New York to commit more violent crimes against innocent citizens" and was "nothing more than an attempt to interfere with the 2024 election".

Mike Lawler, Republican congressman from NY 17, gave a public statement after the conviction: "This is a sad day for America. No matter where you fall on this, it undermines our electoral process and our judicial system. Simply put, it is destructive to our country."

Former Arkansas governor and former Republican presidential candidate Asa Hutchinson stated the "verdict should be respected". Larry Hogan, 2024 Republican candidate for an open U.S. senate seat and former governor of Maryland, urged "all American people to respect the verdict and the legal process".

Several of Trump's Republican proponents have stated that the conviction is good for Trump, likening him to a martyr.

Trump's proponents argued that any sentence restricting Trump's mobility or communication with voters could undermine confidence in the 2024 election. The party prepared for a prison nomination broadcast were Trump to be incarcerated before the start of the 2024 Republican National Convention on July 15.

==== Democratic Party ====
White House Counsel spokesperson Ian Sams issued a one-sentence comment: "We respect the rule of law, and have no additional comment" following the verdict. President Biden largely stayed out of commenting on the case, but reaffirmed the next day that "no one is above the law" and called Republican attacks on the judicial system "reckless", "dangerous", and "irresponsible".

Joe Biden campaign communication director Michael Tyler urged voters to prevent Trump from securing the presidency by voting. Biden's campaign Twitter account posted a donation link. Representatives Jerry Nadler, Judy Chu, Eric Swalwell, James Clyburn, Pramila Jayapal, Jamaal Bowman, Adam Schiff, and Bennie Thompson supported the verdict. Representative Dean Phillips also supported the verdict but then called on New York governor Kathy Hochul to pardon Trump for “the good of the country”. Illinois governor JB Pritzker stated Trump is a "racist, a homophobe, a grifter, and a threat to this country. He can now add one more title to his list — a felon."

==== Other politicians ====
Independent candidate for president Robert F. Kennedy Jr. said to reporters that he did not want to comment on the trial in detail because he only wanted to comment on issues that are of "... deep concern to Americans, and not the issues that, you know, are being used to divide us, the culture war issues."

=== Prosecutors ===
Bragg emphasized that the jury had reached a "unanimous conclusion" that Trump had falsified business records "to conceal a scheme to corrupt the 2016 election. While this defendant may be unlike any other in American history, we arrived at this trial and ultimately today this verdict in the same manner as every other case that comes through the courtroom doors." He added: "I did my job" and that "the only voice that matters is the voice of the jury and the jury has spoken."

=== Congressional proceedings ===
Following the verdict, on May 31, 2024, the House Judiciary Committee chairman, Jim Jordan, asked for Alvin Bragg and Matthew Colangelo to testify before the United States House Judiciary Select Subcommittee on the Weaponization of the Federal Government on June 13. On June 3, Jordan stated "we should use the power of the purse" and sent a new letter to the House Appropriations Committee for the 2025 fiscal year budget recommendations for stripping funding from state and local prosecutors. On June 4, House Speaker Mike Johnson stated Republicans would seek to defund the Justice Department, New York and other jurisdictions for investigating Trump. Bragg stated he would testify after Trump's sentencing hearing, saying he did not want his testimony to interfere with the sentencing.

=== Media ===
Speaking on Fox News, legal analyst Andrew C. McCarthy and host Jeanine Pirro denounced the verdict. Former Fox News host Tucker Carlson wrote on Twitter that the verdict marked the "end of the fairest justice system in the world".

CNN head legal analyst Elie Honig wrote in New York Magazine that prosecutors had "contorted the law" in securing a conviction. CNN's Jake Tapper called the verdict an "unbelievable moment in American history" but expressed ambiguity over its consequences.

MSNBC host Rachel Maddow stated the jury "deserves to be thanked for their efforts".

Within minutes of the verdict, Encyclopædia Britannica updated its article on Trump to include his status as a convicted felon. Editors on the English Wikipedia held a discussion on whether the words "convicted felon" should be included in the first sentence of the article about Trump.

=== Public ===
On November 5, 2024, Donald Trump was elected the 47th President of the United States, defeating Vice President Kamala Harris with 312 votes in the Electoral College, to Harris' 226 votes. President-elect Trump won 77,302,276 votes to Harris' 75,011,877 in the popular vote.

Less than an hour after the verdict was given, a fundraising page for Donald Trump crashed, which Trump's 2024 campaign team claimed was due to an overwhelming influx of visits and donations. Google searches for "Donald Trump donation" rose to its four-year peak based on preliminary data. The Trump campaign reported that it raised $34.8 million from small-dollar donors in less than seven hours after the verdict, breaking the campaign's previous single-day donation record. In the first 24 hours after the verdict, Trump claimed raising $52.8 million which was more than his opponent in the 2024 United States presidential election, Joe Biden, had raised in the entire month of April. The campaign further estimated that $150 million would be raised in the coming days after the verdict, though how much cash would be left after paying Trump's legal fees remains to be seen.

Reuters reported that there were dozens of calls for violent revenge by Trump supporters on pro-Trump websites Truth Social, Patriots.win and The Gateway Pundit, with various targets for attacks being mentioned, including jurors, the judge, left-wingers, and Democrats. NBC News reported that some online posts had urged for the jurors to be doxed and identified, while the supposed addresses of jurors had been uploaded to an online message board featuring pro-Trump content. Within a week after the verdict, Cohen's family had their personal details doxed online.

Several billionaires including Bill Ackman, Miriam Adelson, Harold Hamm, Robert Mercer, John Paulson, Nelson Peltz, David Sacks, Steve Schwarzman, and Steve Wynn stated they would support Trump following the conviction.

=== Global ===
After the verdict, Chinese and Russian state media mirrored Trump's talking points on the trial. The Chinese state-run tabloid Global Times quoted Chinese academics as saying "The attitudes of both parties further reflect the rottenness of American politics, and that the law now seems to be used as a political weapon." Russian state-funded media outlet RT called the trial a "kangaroo court." Another state propaganda outlet, Sputnik, called the trial "rigged" and "disgraceful."

On May 31, 2024, former UK prime minister Boris Johnson wrote an Op-ed for the Daily Mail criticizing the trial and verdict. On June 2, Trump thanked Johnson for his support.

Deputy Prime Minister of Italy and leader of the right-wing Lega party Matteo Salvini offered his "solidarity and full support" to Trump. Hungarian Prime Minister Viktor Orban also supported Trump.

=== Legal scholars ===
On June 10, 2024, the New York City Department of Probation held its initial pre-sentence hearing remotely with Trump and his attorney present. This was criticized as "special treatment" by four of New York City's public defenders associations: The Legal Aid Society, The Bronx Defenders, New York County Defender Services, and Neighborhood Defender Service of Harlem:

All people convicted of crimes should be allowed counsel in their probation interview, not just billionaires. This is just another example of our two-tiered system of justice. Pre-sentencing interviews with probation officers influence sentencing, and public defenders are deprived of joining their clients for these meetings. The option of joining these interviews virtually is typically not extended to the people we represent either. To ensure integrity and fairness, we call on the NYC Department of Probation to ensure that all New Yorkers, regardless of income, status, or class, receive the same pre-sentencing opportunities.
