= Stormy Daniels–Donald Trump scandal =

Political scandal and legal dispute

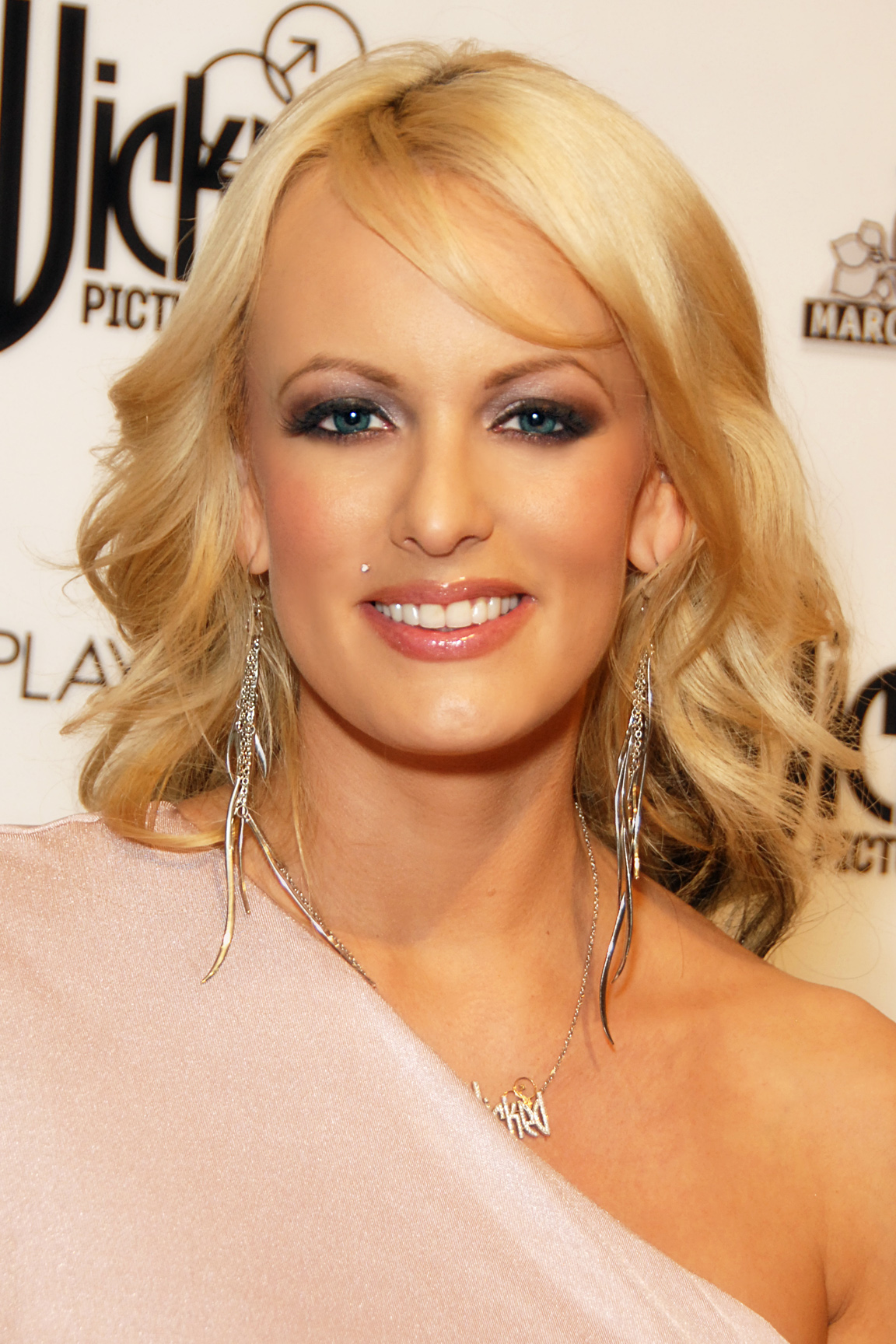
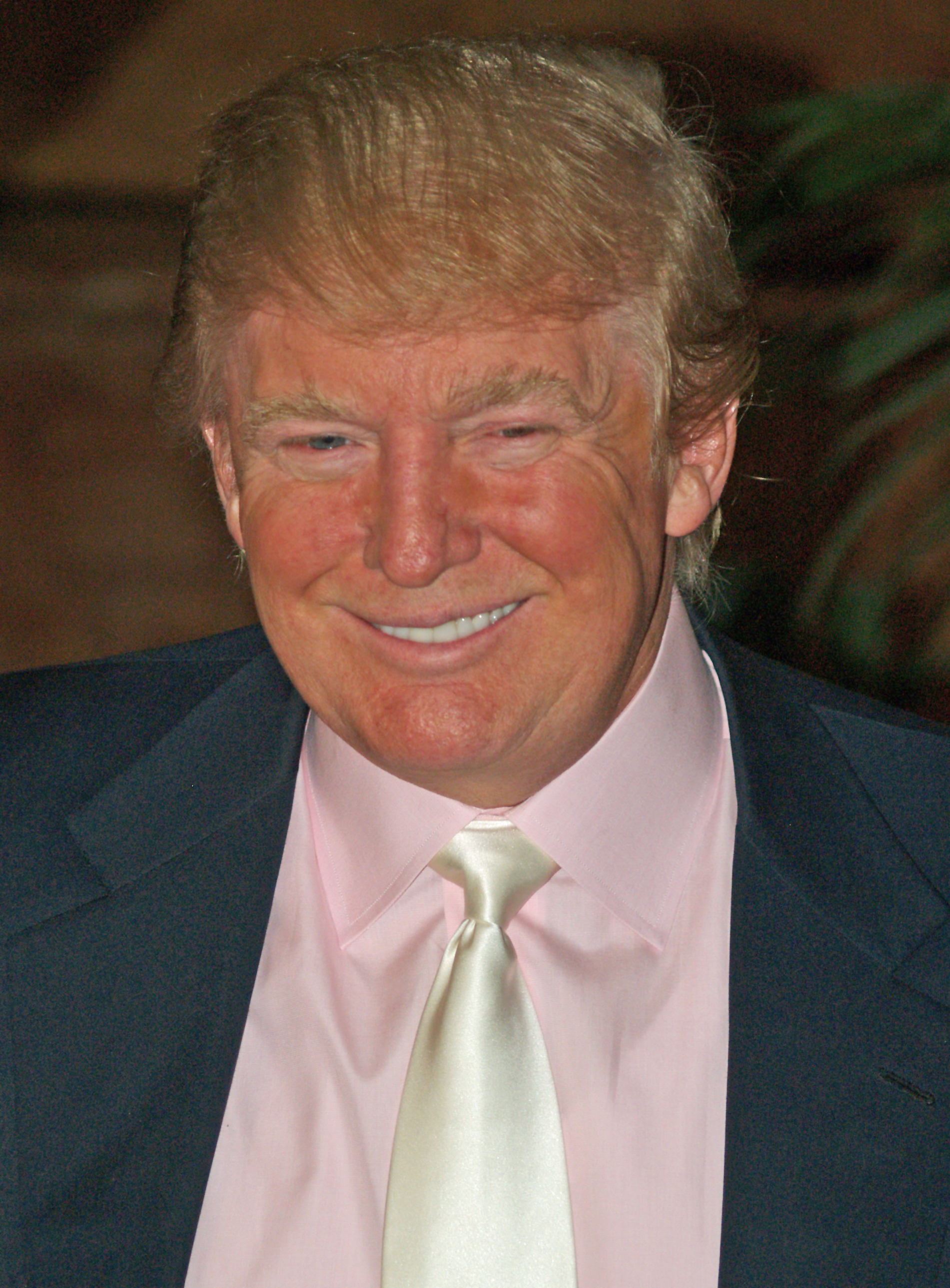
Stormy Daniels (left) in 2010 and Donald Trump (right) in 2008

In 2006, an alleged one-night sexual encounter took place between businessman and later U.S. President Donald Trump and pornographic film actress Stormy Daniels, followed by a conspiracy on the part of Trump to cover up the story in the month prior to the 2016 U.S. presidential election, and Trump's falsification of business records as part of the conspiracy. The story broke in 2018, when The Wall Street Journal reported that Trump's attorney Michael Cohen paid US$130,000 to Daniels as hush money to buy her silence during the 2016 Trump campaign.

After the story broke, Cohen voluntarily cooperated with federal investigators and admitted the payment to Daniels was an illegal contribution to Trump's campaign intended to influence the election. Cohen pleaded guilty to this and other crimes and in December 2018 was sentenced to three years in prison. The scandal grew during 2018, as the public learned that Trump was alleged to have reimbursed Cohen via false business records designed to hide their true nature. The New York district attorney's office impaneled a grand jury to investigate Trump's involvement, and the grand jury voted to indict Trump on March 30, 2023.

Trump was prosecuted in New York for falsifying his business records in order to hide any one of three other crimes: Cohen's illegal campaign contribution, violations of tax laws, and/or Trump's alleged involvement in a conspiracy to unlawfully influence the 2016 presidential election. This marked the first criminal trial of a former U.S. president. A jury found him guilty on all 34 counts he was charged with, making him the first former U.S. president to become a convicted felon. Since The Wall Street Journal's initial report, Daniels and Trump have been outspoken about the scandal and have contested related claims in civil litigation.

== Alleged 2006 encounter ==
In July 2006, Stormy Daniels, an American pornographic film actress, met Trump at a celebrity golf tournament in Nevada. At the time, Trump was married to Melania Trump (who had given birth to their son Barron four months prior) and was the host of the reality TV series The Apprentice.

Daniels said, most recently under oath, that after briefly meeting Trump in 2006, she was invited to dinner and to meet him at his hotel room. Daniels testified that Trump asked her many questions about her life, and at some point Daniels said she had grown up poor. Trump also allegedly asked wide-ranging questions about the business model of pornographic video production, including but not limited to details about condom use and testing for sexually transmitted diseases. Daniels also said Trump talked about making Daniels a guest on The Apprentice. Daniels testified that she thought they would be going to a restaurant, and eventually used the bathroom in Trump's hotel room, but upon re-emerging was surprised to find Trump stripped to his underwear sitting on the bed. Daniels testified she said "I think we should go" and moved toward the door but Trump allegedly stood in her way saying in part, "This is the only way you're getting out of the trailer park." Daniels could not remember how she ended up on the bed, but testified that they had sex in the missionary position and Trump chose not to use a condom. Daniels insisted she was neither forced nor under the influence, but also said it was not something she wanted and that she "blacked out".

== Daniels considered going public in 2011 ==
In 2011, as Trump began exploring a potential presidential bid, Daniels considered selling the story to the celebrity magazine Life & Style for $15,000. As part of the negotiation, Daniels was interviewed and the magazine asked the Trump Organization for comment. In response, Trump's lawyer Michael Cohen threatened litigation and the magazine decided not to publish Daniels's story.

Daniels also talked about the alleged affair with the gossip magazine In Touch Weekly, whom Cohen also threatened to sue if the story were published.

In October 2011, Daniels's agent Gina Rodriguez leaked the story to Nik Richie, author of the gossip blog The Dirty. Daniels complained the blog changed facts of her story and the post was taken down the following day. Cohen testified in May 2024 that he undertook the effort to get the story removed after Trump took him up on his advice to do so.

== Lead up to hush-money payment to Daniels ==
=== Alleged catch-and-kill plan to help Trump's campaign ===
In August 2015, about one month after Trump announced his 2016 campaign, a meeting allegedly took place between Trump, Cohen, and David Pecker, owner of American Media, Inc (AMI), which published the National Enquirer among other periodicals. In April 2024, Pecker testified under oath describing an alleged agreement at that meeting saying,

What I would do is I would run or publish positive stories about Mr. Trump and I would publish negative stories about his opponents...I said I would be your eyes and ears because I know the Trump Organization has a very small staff.

And then I said that anything I hear in the marketplace, if I hear anything negative about yourself, or if I hear anything about women selling stories, I would notify Michael Cohen... and then he would be able have them kill in another magazine or have them not be published or somebody would have to purchase them.

Pecker testified that after the meeting he immediately briefed National Enquirer editor Dylan Howard about the meeting's substance, i.e., that either Pecker or Howard were to alert Cohen if they learned of potential stories about Trump and that they were "going to try to help the campaign, and to do that, I want to keep this as quiet as possible."

Over the next several months Pecker, through AMI, purchased two such stories, one from Dino Sajudin and the other from Playboy model Karen McDougal.

=== AMI buys Dino Sajudin's story ===
In October, according to Pecker's 2024 testimony, Howard called Pecker to say Trump Tower doorman Dino Sajudin was trying to sell a different story about Trump, one involving an illegitimate child allegedly fathered by Trump. Pecker testified that he immediately informed Cohen per the August 2015 agreement. Pecker testified he had AMI investigate the story and eventually concluded it was not true, but Pecker testified he instructed AMI to purchase the story anyway so it would not be published elsewhere before the 2016 presidential election.

On November 15, AMI and Sajudin allegedly signed a "Source Agreement".

On December 17, AMI and Sajudin allegedly signed an "Amendment" to the Source Agreement. In his 2024 testimony, Pecker said the amendment to the source agreement was made at Cohen's request for purposes of further reducing the chance the story might leak before the election. According to the Associated Press, Cohen admitted that "as a Trump spokesman" he had "discussed" the Sajudin story with AMI while AMI was "working on it".

The following day AMI had the National Enquirer pay Sajudin the agreed-upon $30,000. According to Pecker's 2024 testimony Cohen told Pecker "The Boss will be very pleased" and that Pecker understood "The Boss" to be a reference to Trump. Pecker also testified there came a time that Pecker wanted to release Sajudin, since the story was not true and Pecker wanted to avoid "problems", but Cohen insisted the release be delayed until after the election.

=== AMI buys Karen McDougal's story ===
On August 5, AMI allegedly signed a "Name and Rights License Agreement" with Karen McDougal, who claimed to have had a months-long relationship with Trump several years earlier. In part the agreement assigned McDougal's rights to the story to AMI.

On August 9, AMI allegedly paid McDougal the agreed-upon $150,000.

On September 6, Cohen allegedly made a secret recording of a conversation between himself and Trump, during which Cohen allegedly told Trump that Trump would have to pay $150,000 for "all that info regarding our friend David", that Cohen had talked to Weisselberg about "how to set the whole thing up", and the deal included "All the stuff. Because -- here, you never know where that company, you never know what he's..." and Trump allegedly can be heard worrying about having a single point of failure to the plan, saying "Maybe he gets hit by a truck."

Sometime in September, according to Pecker's testimony, Cohen called Pecker to say Trump allegedly wanted to buy the rights to McDougal's story and boxes of Trump-related info in AMI's possession. Asked if Pecker knew why Trump allegedly wanted these materials, Pecker said Cohen told him "The Boss said that if [Pecker] got hit by a bus and/or the company was sold, he did not want for someone else to potentially publish those stories."

On September 21, AMI allegedly caused a third party limited liability company (LLC) to invoice Cohen's LLC for $125,000, the agreed-upon price for Cohen's LLC to acquire AMI's rights to the McDougal story, according to Pecker's 2024 testimony.

On September 30, AMI allegedly agreed to assign its rights to McDougal's story to Cohen's "Resolution Consultants LLC" for "good and valuable consideration".

Sometime in the first week of October, according to Pecker's 2024 testimony, Pecker consulted with counsel, decided to cancel the sale of McDougal's story to Cohen's LLC, and communicated that decision to Cohen, who allegedly replied "The Boss will be very angry with you." AMI was never reimbursed for purchasing the McDougal story, according to Pecker.

=== Access Hollywood Tape becomes public ===
On October 7, 2016—only one month before the 2016 election—the Access Hollywood tape was released. In it, then-Republican candidate Donald Trump described his approach to seducing women:

I don't even wait. And when you're a star, they let you do it. You can do anything. ... Grab 'em by the pussy. You can do anything.

When the tape became public, multiple Republican leaders wanted Trump to drop out of the race, and House speaker Paul Ryan canceled an event with Trump.

== Trump's attorney pays hush money to Stormy Daniels ==
On October 8, 2016, Pecker allegedly learned that Daniels was trying to sell the story of her alleged 2006 affair with Trump.

On October 9, Cohen allegedly learned that Pecker had instructed AMI to not purchase Daniels's story.

On October 17, Cohen submitted paperwork to create a Delaware-registered limited liability company named "Essential Consultants, LLC".

On October 25, Pecker again allegedly told Cohen that AMI would not buy Daniels's story and that Pecker believed Cohen should buy her story.

On October 26, Cohen opened a bank account for the LLC and on October 27 used his personal home equity line of credit to wire $130,000 into the LLC's account. Cohen corresponded with the bank using his Trump Organization email account and representing himself as "Special Counsel to Donald J. Trump".

== Investigations ==
On January 12, 2018, The Wall Street Journal reported that in October 2016, just before the 2016 United States presidential election, Michael Cohen, executive vice president at the Trump Organization and special counsel to then-presidential candidate Donald Trump, arranged a payment of US$130,000 to pornographic film actress Stormy Daniels to stop her disclosing an affair she and Trump allegedly had in July 2006. Daniels had signed a non-disclosure agreement (NDA). At first, Cohen denied Trump had the alleged affair and sought to suppress the allegation based on the NDA, but a month later publicly acknowledged making the payment.

Besides allegations surrounding the details of the affair itself, the acknowledged payment raised legal and ethical questions as to whether the payment violated federal campaign finance laws, either because the payment was not duly disclosed as a campaign contribution or because campaign funds may have been used towards the payment. On February 13, Cohen said he paid the money out of his own pocket, not as a campaign contribution; and that neither The Trump Organization nor the Trump campaign reimbursed him for making it. On April 5, Trump falsely said he had no knowledge of Cohen's payment; but on April 26 admitted for the first time that Cohen represented him in "the Stormy Daniels deal". On May 2, Trump's new lawyer Rudy Giuliani said that Trump had reimbursed Cohen for the payment.

In August 2018, Cohen pleaded guilty to eight criminal charges, including a campaign finance violation for Daniels's payment. He stated under oath that he paid her "in coordination with and at the direction of a candidate for federal office". Cohen was sentenced to three years in federal prison on various charges, and was disbarred.

Daniels filed three lawsuits against Trump and/or Cohen. In the first lawsuit she argued that the NDA was invalid. She won the lawsuit, though it was dismissed after Trump and Cohen agreed not to enforce the NDA. A California court subsequently ordered Trump pay $44,100 to reimburse her legal fees. The second lawsuit, in which she argued she was defamed, was dismissed when U.S. district judge James Otero said the tweet in question "constitutes 'rhetorical hyperbole' normally associated with politics and public discourse in the United States" that is protected by the First Amendment. She was ordered to pay $293,000 for attorneys' fees and another $1,000 in sanctions. She was later ordered to repay Trump an additional $121,972, and then later $5,150, in legal fees for failed motions to reduce the initial fee payment. In the third lawsuit she claimed that Cohen colluded with her previous attorney Keith Davidson against her interests when he negotiated the payment. The lawsuit did not name Trump as a defendant, and settled in May 2019.

Trump's accounting firm, Mazars, provided his tax returns and related documents to the Manhattan district attorney, Cyrus Vance Jr., following the outcome of the Supreme Court's Trump v. Vance ruling in February 2021. Although an internal report said there was "reason to believe" Trump's campaign had knowingly violated campaign finance law, the Federal Election Commission (FEC) abandoned an inquiry into the payment to Daniels. The FEC's vote on May 6, 2021, split 2–2 along party lines.

On March 30, 2023, a Manhattan grand jury indicted Trump for his alleged role in the scandal. Trump was arraigned in the Manhattan district court on April 4.

== Allegation and non-disclosure agreement ==
The Wall Street Journal reported on January 12, 2018, that Cohen paid Daniels $130,000 in October 2016, a month before the election, to stop her discussing the alleged affair.

Cohen denied the existence of the affair on behalf of his client Donald Trump on January 14, 2018, but acknowledged a month later, on February 13, that he paid Daniels $130,000.

Daniels filed a lawsuit against Trump on March 6, 2018, claiming that the non-disclosure agreement she signed about the alleged affair was invalid since Trump never personally signed it despite acknowledging that she accepted the payment made in exchange for her silence in the matter. It also alleged that Trump's attorney tried to intimidate Daniels and "scare her into not talking". Cohen initiated an ex parte arbitration process the next day that resulted in an order barring Daniels from disclosing "confidential information" related to the non-disclosure agreement. The order that Daniels's lawyers called "bogus" was to remain confidential.

In an interview with 60 Minutes that aired March 25, 2018, Daniels said that she and Trump had sex once. She also said that she was threatened in front of her infant daughter after a fitness class in Las Vegas in 2011. The threat pressured her to later sign a non-disclosure agreement.

FBI agents raided Cohen's office and seized emails, tax documents, and business records relating to several matters, including the payment to Daniels, on April 9, 2018.

In April 2024, it was revealed that the $130,000 hush money agreement was drafted by Daniels's lawyer at the time Keith Davidson. In the agreement, Daniels was given the pseudonym "Peggy Peterson," while Trump was given the pseudonym "David Dennison."

In May 2024, Cohen testified that he suggested the idea of including a clause in the agreement which ensured that Daniels would be penalized $1,000,000 every time she told her story. Prior to Cohen's testimony, Daniels herself testified that the agreement made so she would be forced to pay $1,000,000 for every time she committed a violation by telling her story.

== Status of Cohen's payment ==
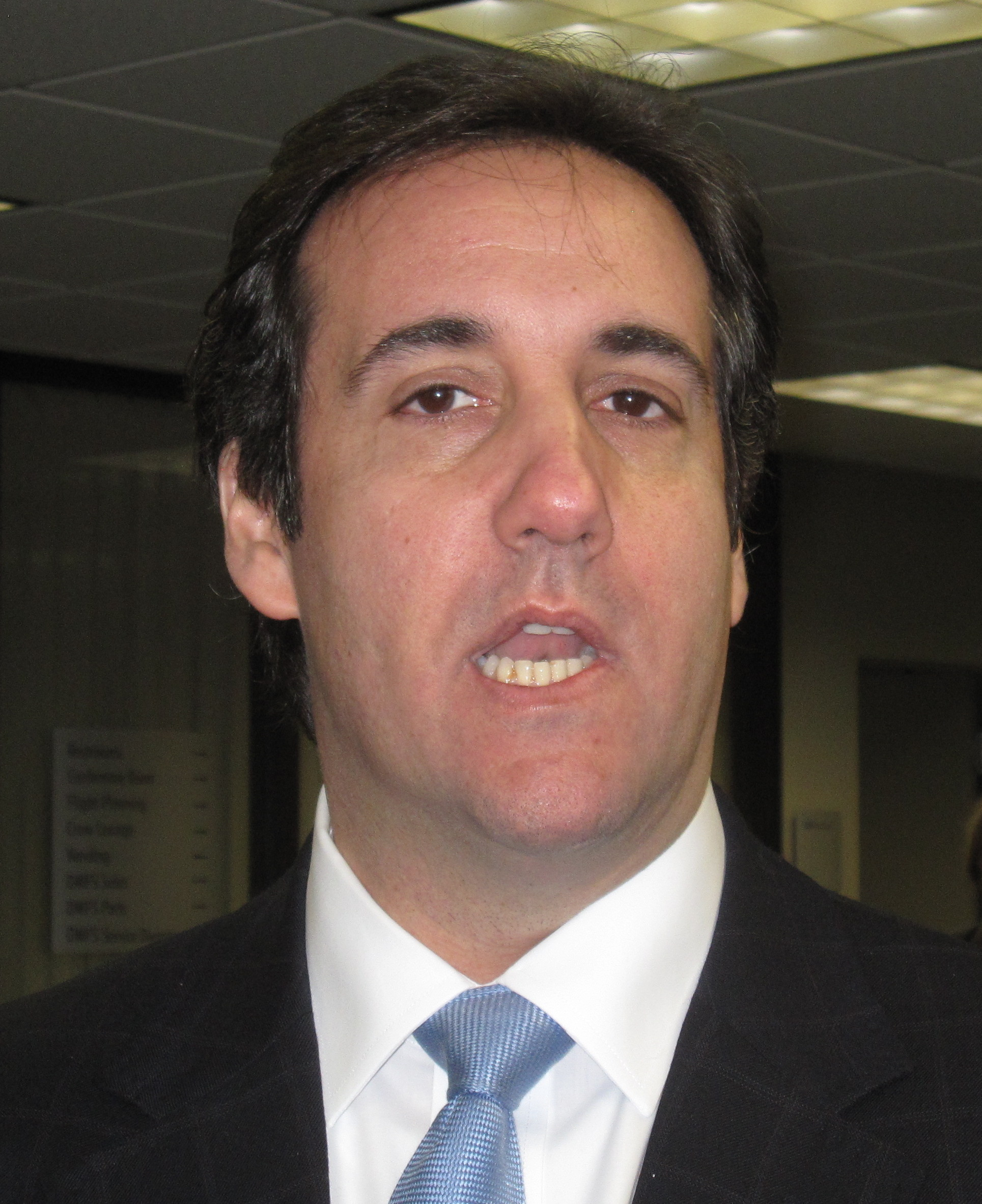
Michael Cohen in 2011

Daniels's lawyer said that the $130,000 payment to her was a cover-up, while others also raised questions about whether the payment violated federal campaign finance laws, which may be the case if campaign funds were involved. The Wall Street Journal reported on January 12, 2018, that Daniels was paid $130,000 after a non-disclosure agreement via a Delaware limited liability company called Essential Consultants LLC that Cohen created for the purpose. The political watchdog group Common Cause filed a complaint on January 22, calling on the Federal Election Commission (FEC) and U.S. Department of Justice to investigate if the reported payout violated campaign finance rules, saying the alleged payment amounted to an in-kind donation to Trump's presidential campaign that should have been publicly disclosed in its official reports.

Cohen responded to The New York Times on February 13 that he paid Daniels the $130,000 from his own pocket, not as a campaign contribution, and that neither the Trump Organization nor the Trump campaign reimbursed him for making it. The Washington Post later noted that Cohen never ruled out the possibility that Trump reimbursed Cohen for the payment stating that he used his own money to "facilitate" it. Cohen said on March 13 that he transferred funds from his home equity line of credit to Essential Consultants LLC and from the company to Daniels's attorney.

On April 5, 2018, Trump claimed that he had no knowledge of Cohen's payment to Daniels but admitted that Cohen represented him in "the Stormy Daniels deal" for the first time on April 26. Trump's new lawyer Rudy Giuliani said on May 2 that Trump reimbursed Cohen for the payment, stating Trump "didn't know about the specifics of it but he did know about the general arrangement, that Michael [Cohen] would take care of things like this". Trump tweeted the next day that Cohen entered into the non-disclosure agreement and stated that Cohen was reimbursed for the $130,000 through monthly $35,000 retainer payments to him tweeting "Money from the campaign, or campaign contributions, played no roll [sic] in this transaction". Trump contradicted Giuliani's statements on May 4, saying that Giuliani "wasn't familiar with everything" and that, "He started yesterday. He'll get his facts straight." Giuliani later released a statement saying "the payment was made to resolve a personal and false allegation in order to protect the President's family".

Cohen pleaded guilty to eight charges on August 21, 2018, including a campaign finance violation, for his role in the payment. He implicated Trump, saying that he acted "in coordination and at the direction of a candidate for federal office". Trump said that he only knew about the payments "later on", adding that the payments "didn't come out of the campaign, they came from me". The New York Times reported on August 22 that Cohen's court documents revealed two senior Trump Organization executives were also involved in the hush-money payments. It also said that Cohen "coordinated with one or more members of the campaign, including through meetings and phone calls" about the payments.

Trump denied directing Cohen to make hush payments on December 13, 2018.

== Legal matters ==
Common Cause filed complaints with the Department of Justice and the FEC claiming that the $130,000 payment to Daniels was a campaign contribution and that Trump's campaign violated campaign finance laws by not disclosing the payment to the FEC. If the payment was made by Cohen, there is also a question whether it is an illegal or undisclosed in-kind contribution to the Trump campaign. However, several members of Trump's legal team deny the payment related to the campaign, instead claiming that it was a personal payment, to save Trump's marriage. Questions have also been raised about how the payment was categorized for tax purposes, and if there is a possibility of tax-based charges or fees relating to the payment.

Daniels filed a civil suit in an attempt to nullify the non-disclosure agreement between Trump and her on March 6, 2018. The hearing was set for July; but U.S. district judge S. James Otero pushed it back, citing the possible indictment of Cohen in the ongoing criminal probe by federal prosecutors.

Cohen also faces discipline from the State Bar of New York under the New York Rules of Professional Conduct that prohibits lawyers making loans to clients.

A well-established principle of contract law is the offer and acceptance of "consideration" or something of value, in exchange for a promise to do something (or not do something, as in the case of a non-disclosure agreement). Legal experts argue that the $130,000 payment being accepted by one party is valid consideration and enforceable regardless of the unsigned state of the Daniels non-disclosure agreement, but other elements in the Daniels agreement make predicting the outcome difficult. Issues like the use of pseudonyms and the disclosure exception for law enforcement investigations may favor Daniels's position.

Cohen pleaded guilty to eight charges on August 21, 2018, including tax fraud, bank fraud, and campaign finance violations, for his role in the payment, and implicated Trump, who in response said that he only knew about the payments "later on".

The Wall Street Journal reported on November 9, 2018, that federal prosecutors have evidence of Trump's "central role" in payments to both Stormy Daniels and Karen McDougal that violated campaign-finance laws.

In a sentencing memorandum for Cohen on December 7, 2018, federal prosecutors implicated Trump in directing Cohen to commit the campaign finance law felonies that Cohen pleaded guilty to. Trump tweeted shortly after the memorandum court filing, "Totally clears the president. Thank you!" Cohen was sentenced to three years in federal prison.

NBC News reported on December 13, 2018, that Trump was present in an August 2015 meeting with Cohen and David Pecker when they discussed how American Media could help counter unfavorable stories about Trump's relationships with women, confirming previous reporting by The Wall Street Journal.

The U.S. attorney for the Southern District of New York investigated the possible role of Trump and others regarding concealment of hush-money payments, but indicated in a sealed court filing that it is unlikely to bring additional charges. On July 17, 2019, U.S. district judge William H. Pauley III, finding the investigation to be over, ordered that filing and materials related to the probe be unsealed on July 18, 2019.

== Timeline ==
=== 2005 ===
In September, Trump is videoed describing his attempt to seduce a married woman... He adds, "I don't even wait. And when you're a star, they let you do it. You can do anything. ... Grab 'em by the pussy. You can do anything."

=== 2006 ===
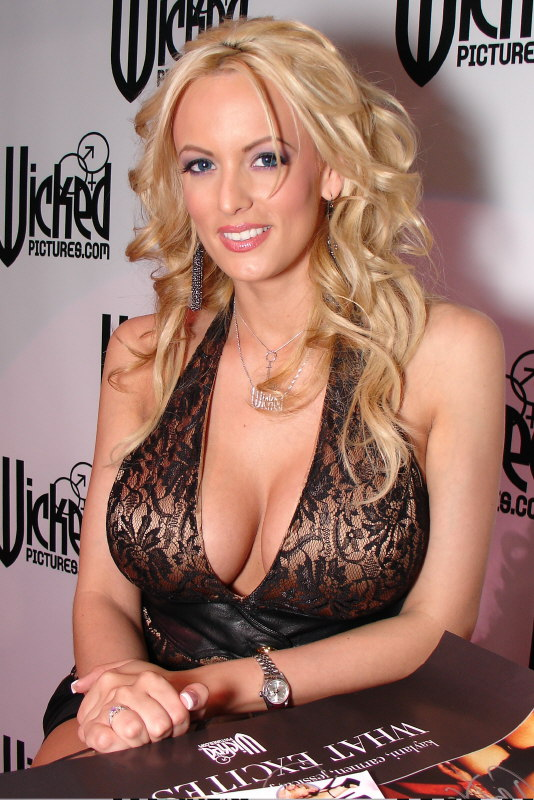
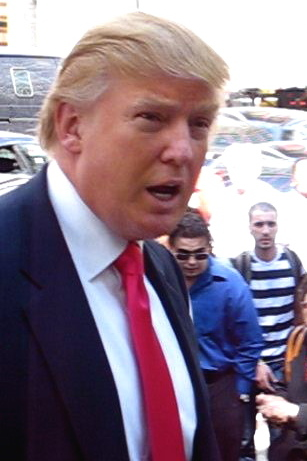
Daniels (left) and Trump (right) in 2006

In July, Trump and Daniels meet at the American Century Celebrity Golf Tournament in Lake Tahoe, Nevada and, according to Daniels, have consensual sex.

=== 2007 ===
In January, Daniels attends a launch party for Trump Vodka at the Les Deux club in Los Angeles.

In March, Daniels flies to New York and meets with Trump outside his office in Trump Tower.

=== 2011 ===
In April, Daniels conducts an interview with In Touch Weekly about her alleged affair with Trump. Cohen "intervene[s]," the story is not published and Daniels is not paid.

In May, Daniels takes a polygraph test at the request of Bauer Publishing, then the owners of In Touch Weekly, that supports her account of having sex with Trump.

In October, two publications reported the alleged Trump–Daniels affair.

=== 2015 ===
==== Trump announces candidacy for US President ====
In June, Trump announced he would run for US president in the 2016 election.

==== Alleged meeting between Trump, Cohen, and Pecker ====
In August, a meeting allegedly took place between Trump, Cohen, and David Pecker, owner of American Media, Inc (AMI), which among other periodicals published the National Enquirer. In April 2024, Pecker testified under oath describing an alleged agreement at that meeting saying,

What I would do is I would run or publish positive stories about Mr. Trump and I would publish negative stories about his opponents...I said I would be your eyes and ears because I know the Trump Organization has a very small staff.

And then I said that anything I hear in the marketplace, if I hear anything negative about yourself, or if I hear anything about women selling stories, I would notify Michael Cohen... and then he would be able have them kill in another magazine or have them not be published or somebody would have to purchase them."

Pecker testified that after the meeting he immediately briefed National Enquirer editor Dylan Howard about the meeting's substance, i.e., that either Pecker or Howard were to alert Cohen if they learned of potential stories about Trump and that they were "going to try to help the campaign, and to do that, I want to keep this as quiet as possible."

==== AMI buys Sajudin story ====
In October, according to Pecker's 2024 testimony, Howard called Pecker to say Trump Tower doorman Dino Sajudin was trying to sell a different story about Trump, one involving an illegitimate child allegedly fathered by Trump. Pecker testified that he immediately informed Cohen per the August 2015 agreement. Pecker testified he had AMI investigate the story and eventually concluded it was not true, but Pecker testified he instructed AMI to purchase the story anyway so it would not be published elsewhere before the 2016 presidential election.

On November 15, AMI and Sajudin allegedly signed a "Source Agreement".

On December 17, AMI and Sajudin allegedly signed an "Amendment" to the Source Agreement. In his 2024 testimony, Pecker said the amendment to the source agreement was made at Cohen's request for purposes of further reducing the chance the story might leak before the election. According to the AP, Cohen admitted that "as a Trump spokesman" he had "discussed" the Sajudin story with AMI while AMI was "working on it".

The following day AMI had the National Enquirer pay Sajudin the agreed-upon $30,000. According to Pecker's 2024 testimony Cohen told Pecker "The Boss will be very pleased" and that Pecker understood "The Boss" to be a reference to Trump. Pecker also testified there came a time that Pecker wanted to release Sajudin, since the story wasn't true and Pecker wanted to avoid "problems", but Cohen insisted the release be delayed until after the election.

=== 2016 ===
==== AMI buys McDougal's story ====
On August 5, AMI allegedly signed a "Name and Rights License Agreement" with Karen McDougal, who claimed to have had a months-long relationship with Trump several years earlier. In part the agreement assigned McDougal's rights to the story to AMI.

On August 9, AMI allegedly paid McDougal the agreed-upon $150,000.

On September 6, Cohen allegedly made a secret recording of a conversation between himself and Trump, during which Cohen allegedly told Trump that Trump would have to pay $150,000 for "all that info regarding our friend David", that Cohen had talked to Weisselberg about "how to set the whole thing up", and the deal included "All the stuff. Because -- here, you never know where that company, you never know what he’s..." and Trump allegedly can be heard saying "Maybe he gets hit by a truck".

Sometime in September, according to Pecker's testimony, Cohen called Pecker to say Trump allegedly wanted to buy the rights to McDougal's story and boxes of Trump-related info in AMI's possession. Asked if Pecker knew why Trump allegedly wanted these materials, Pecker said Cohen told him "The Boss said that if [Pecker] got hit by a bus and/or the company was sold, he did not want for someone else to potentially publish those stories."

On September 21, AMI allegedly caused a third party LLC to invoice Cohen's LLC for $125,000, the agreed-upon price for Cohen's LLC to acquire AMI's rights to the McDougal story, according to Pecker's 2024 testimony.

On September 30, AMI allegedly agreed to assign its rights to McDougal's story to Cohen's "Resolution Consultants LLC" for "good and valuable consideration".

Sometime in the first week of October, according to Pecker's 2024 testimony, Pecker consulted with counsel, decided to cancel the sale of McDougal's story to Cohen's LLC, and communicated that decision to Cohen, who allegedly replied "The Boss will be very angry with you." AMI was never reimbursed for purchasing the McDougal story, according to Pecker.

==== Access Hollywood Tape becomes public ====
On October 7, the existence of the 2005 Access Hollywood tape was released to the public.

==== Cohen's LLC buys Daniel's story ====
On October 8, Pecker allegedly learned that Daniels was trying to sell the story of her alleged 2006 affair with Trump.

On October 9, Cohen allegedly learned that Pecker had instructed AMI to not purchase Daniels's story.

On October 17, Cohen submitted paperwork to create a Delaware-registered limited liability company named "Essential Consultants, LLC".

On October 25, Pecker again allegedly told Cohen that AMI would not buy Daniels's story and that Pecker believed Cohen should buy her story.

On October 26, Cohen opened a bank account for his company Essential Consultants, LLC, and then uses his personal home equity to transfer $131,000 into the LLC's account. Cohen corresponded with the bank using his Trump Organization email account and representing himself as "Special Counsel to Donald J. Trump".

On October 27, Cohen wires $130,000 from his LLC to Daniels's attorney.

==== November ====
On November 4, The Wall Street Journal reported Trump's affairs with both McDougal and Daniels.

On November 8, Trump won the 2016 US presidential election.

==== December ====
On December 9, Cohen allegedly called Davidson complaining that Cohen would not be part of Trump's team in Washington and that he had not yet been reimbursed for the $130,000 Cohen paid to Daniels.

Sometime "around November/December", Pecker allegedly met first with Cohen and then with Trump at Trump Tower. Cohen allegedly asked Pecker for help getting his expected "Christmas bonus" from Trump. When Pecker later met with Trump Pecker allegedly said that Cohen had been loyal and "his bonus is really very important to him on the monies he's going to receive", to which Trump allegedly replied, "Don't worry about it, I'll take care of it."

=== 2017 ===
==== January ====
On January 7, Trump allegedly met with Pecker at Trump Tower and thanked Pecker for preventing publication of Sajudin's and McDougal's stories.

On January 19, Cohen announced he would start a new job as Trump's personal attorney.

On January 20, Trump was sworn in as president.

January 27 was Cohen's last day as a paid employee of Trump Organization, according to the company's finance controller at the time.

==== February ====
In Cohen's 2019 congressional testimony, he said:

In February 2017, one month into his presidency, I’m visiting President Trump in the oval office for the first time, and it’s truthfully awe-inspiring. He’s showing me all around and pointing to different paintings. And he says to me something to the effect of, Don’t worry, Michael. Your January and February reimbursement checks are coming. They were FedEx’d from New York. And it takes a while for that to get through the White House system.

As he promised, I received the first check for the reimbursement of $70,000 not long thereafter.

On February 6, McConney, then-finance controller for the Trump Organization, allegedly emailed Cohen to remind Cohen to submit the invoices Cohen allegedly discussed with then-Trump Organization chief financial officer Allen Weisselberg.

On February 8, Cohen was allegedly photographed in the White House Press Briefing Room.

On February 14, Cohen allegedly emailed McConney saying "Please remind me of the monthly amount" that Cohen should bill on the invoices, to which McConney allegedly replied "$35,000 per month". Later that day Cohen sent an invoice to McConney billing $35,000 for each of January and February.

On February 14, a check from the Trump trust account to Cohen for $70,000 was prepared. The check allegedly bore Trump's signature. Vouchers for $35,000 for both January and February were attached and coded as "legal retainer". Id.

=== 2018 ===
==== January ====
On January 12, 2018, The Wall Street Journal reported that Michael Cohen paid Daniels $130,000 in October 2016, a month before the presidential election, to stop her discussing an affair she allegedly had with Trump in 2006.

On January 14, Cohen denied the existence of an affair on behalf of his client, Trump, but acknowledged that he had paid Daniels $130,000. He also said that the payment was out of his own money. Initially, it was reported that the payment came via Essential Consultants LLC, a private company founded by Cohen in Delaware on October 17, 2016, which received £500,000 from Columbus Nova, an affiliate of Viktor Vekselberg's Renova Group. Daniels was reportedly in talks to tell her account to both Good Morning America and Slate at the time. The Daily Beast also discussed with Daniels "after three sources—including fellow porn star Alana Evans—told the website that both Daniels and Trump were involved. Daniels ultimately backed out on November 3, just five days before the 2016 election."

On January 16, CNN reported that Fox News reporter Diana Falzone wrote an article about Daniels and Trump in October 2016, that Fox News never published. It included Daniels's then-manager Gina Rodriguez alleging on-the-record about a sexual relationship between them. CNN also reported that "Falzone had even seen emails about a settlement" between Daniels and Trump. In Touch Weekly published excerpts of the 2011 interview of Daniels alleging a 2006 extramarital affair with Trump the next day. The magazine described her account as being supported by a polygraph and corroborated by both her friend Randy Spears and her ex-husband Mike Moz. Although Cohen alleged that claims made in that interview were untrue and previously published in Life & Style magazine on October 24, 2011, The Daily Beast described the interviews as "hardly identical". Although Daniels declined to comment to Life & Style, the In Touch Weekly interview had direct quotes from Daniels.

On January 18, Mother Jones reported that Daniels considered running to become the senator for Louisiana in 2009, identified Trump as a potential campaign donor to a political consultant, and described details of a sexual relationship with Trump. That consultant discussed Daniels's revelations to another consultant in emails that Mother Jones obtained and published.

==== February ====
On February 13, Cohen publicly acknowledged paying Daniels $130,000 and said the payment was made with his own funds. He also said that neither the Trump Organization nor the campaign reimbursed him. Daniels's attorneys notified Cohen that by disclosing the payment Cohen was in breach of the NDA agreement, and so Daniels was no longer bound to it.

==== March ====
On March 5, The Wall Street Journal cited anonymous sources recounting Cohen as saying he missed two deadlines to pay Daniels since Cohen "couldn't reach Mr. Trump in the hectic final days of the presidential campaign" and that he complained that he had not been reimbursed for the payment after Trump's election. Cohen described this report as "fake news".

On March 6, Daniels filed a lawsuit against Trump in California Superior Court, claiming that the non-disclosure agreement never came into effect since Trump never signed it among other things. A complaint for declaratory relief, the suit seeks a judgment declaring that no agreement formed and for costs of the suit and other relief the Court deemed proper. The Court set a July hearing date.

On March 7, NBC News reported that Cohen initiated an ex parte private arbitration case against Daniels on February 27, 2018, and obtained a restraining order barring Daniels from disclosing "confidential information" related to the NDA agreement and stated that Daniels faces penalties for discussing her alleged relationship with Trump in public. Daniels's lawyers called the order bogus and was to remain confidential. White House press secretary Sarah Sanders said that President Trump's personal attorneys won an arbitration case "in the President's favor" against Daniels, and "there was no knowledge of any payments [to Daniels] from the President".

On March 14, documents surfaced indicating that Jill Martin, assistant general counsel for The Trump Organization, signed legal papers in connection with the restraining order against Daniels.

On March 16, Daniels's lawyer, Michael Avenatti, said on both CNN and MSNBC that Daniels had been threatened with physical harm if she was not silent about the alleged affair with Trump. Avenatti did not state when the threat was made, or who made it.

On March 16, Cohen asked for Daniels's suit to move from the state to federal court, based on the criteria that the parties live in different places and the amount at stake is more than $75,000 with Trump's approval. Cohen asserted that Daniels could owe up to $20 million in liquidated damages for breaching the agreement. The filing marked the first time that Trump himself, through his personal attorney, took part in the Daniels litigation.

On March 25, Daniels's involvement with Trump was the subject of a segment on the U.S. television news program 60 Minutes. The segment included interviews by Anderson Cooper with Daniels, her attorney Avenatti, and Trevor Potter, the former chairman of the FEC. Daniels said in her interview that she briefly spanked Trump with a copy of a Forbes magazine; had sex with Trump in the same encounter; later met Trump privately but did not have sex on that occasion; and signed multiple false statements that the affair was not under pressure from her former business manager–lawyer. She also said that, while she was getting her infant daughter out of their vehicle in a Las Vegas parking lot, an unknown man showed up at the vehicle and said "Leave Trump alone. Forget the story. That's a beautiful little girl. It'd be a shame if something happened to her mom".

==== April 2018 ====
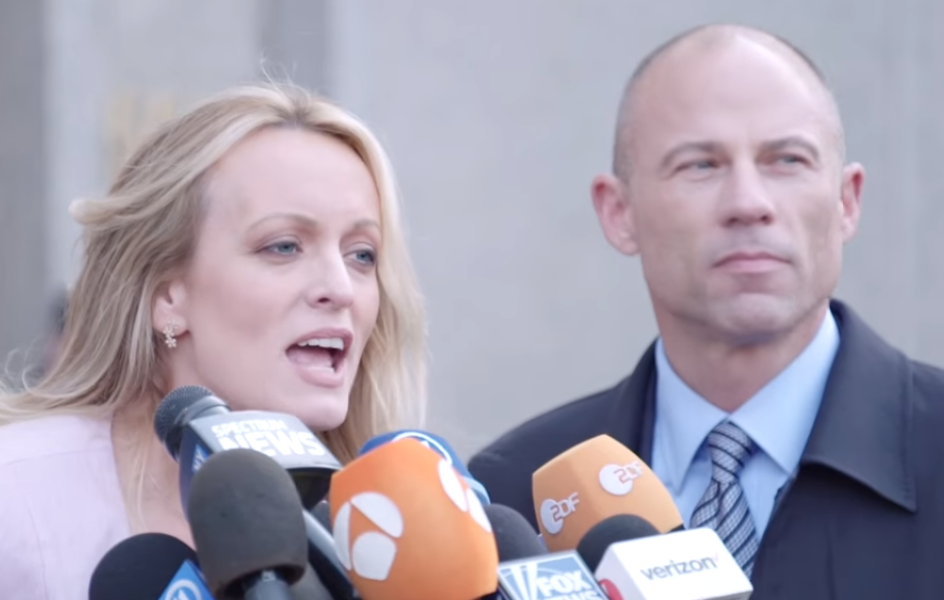
Daniels and Avenatti address the media in 2018.

- April 5, 2018: Trump said he did not know about the $130,000 payment Cohen made to Daniels on Air Force One. He also said he was not aware of why Cohen had made the payment or where he got the money.
- April 9, 2018: FBI agents raid Cohen's office and seized emails, tax documents, and business records relating to several matters, including payments to Daniels. The raid conducted on behalf of the United States attorney for the Southern District of New York, and likely resulted from information uncovered from Mueller's investigation. Daniels reportedly cooperated with federal investigators following the raid.
- April 26, 2018: Trump said in an interview on Fox & Friends that Cohen "would represent me on some things. He represents me like with this crazy Stormy Daniels deal, he represented me". This is Trump's first admission of any relationship to the case.
- April 27, 2018: Judge put Stormy Daniels lawsuit on hold for at least 90 days while the criminal investigation of Cohen moves forward in New York since Cohen asserted his Fifth Amendment right not to incriminate himself while the criminal investigation continues.
- April 30, 2018: Daniels's lawyer Michael Avenatti, tweeted about a lawsuit filed against Trump, where Daniels currently sues Trump for his "recent irresponsible and defamatory statements" made against her. These statements appear in a tweet mocking the released police sketch of the man Daniels claims told her to drop her allegations of the affair, and have been claimed to be defamatory as they accuse Daniels of falsely accusing a person of threatening her.

==== May ====
- May 2, 2018: Trump's personal lawyer Rudy Giuliani said on Fox News that "the president repaid" Cohen the $130,000 that Cohen had paid to Daniels. He also said that Trump "did know the general arrangement" of Cohen's payment, but not "the specifics". This contradicts Trump's claim of April 5 that he had no knowledge of the payment.
- May 3, 2018: Trump tweeted that Cohen entered into a non-disclosure agreement with Daniels. He tweeted that Cohen reimbursed for the $130,000 through monthly $35,000 retainer payments to him and wrote that "Money from the campaign, or campaign contributions, played no roll [sic] in this transaction".
- May 4, 2018: Trump contradicted Giuliani's statements, saying that Giuliani "wasn't familiar with everything" and that "He started yesterday. He'll get his facts straight." Giuliani later released a statement saying "the payment was made to resolve a personal and false allegation in order to protect the President's family".
- May 5, 2018: Daniels appeared on Saturday Night Live, playing herself, in a sketch involving the president, played by Alec Baldwin, and mocking Trump with the line, "I know you don't believe in climate change but a storm's a-coming baby".
- May 9, 2018: CNN reported that Mueller's team questioned Russian oligarch Viktor Vekselberg about hundreds of thousands of dollars in payments his company's US affiliate made to Cohen. The US Treasury Department opened an investigation into the leak of Michael Cohen's private bank records to Michael Avenatti, the porn actress's lawyer, who sent a seven-page dossier to The New York Times and other news outlets.
- May 10, 2018: Newsweek reported that Michael Cohen's lawyers argued that some of the small transactions that Avenatti reported were for a different Michael Cohen but did not deny that the large transactions were for their client. Greenberg Traurig, the former law firm of Giuliani, released a statement against Giuliani's claim that it was common practice for lawyers to make secret payments to individuals. A spokesperson for the firm stated: "We cannot speak for Mr. Giuliani .... Speaking for ourselves, we would not condone payments of the nature alleged to have been made or otherwise without the knowledge and discretion of a client."
- May 16, 2018: Trump acknowledged that Cohen was paid between $100,000 and $250,000 last year, out of which potentially came the $130,000 payment for Daniels, in his annual disclosure of personal finances required by the Office of Government Ethics. The form reports on page 45, "Mr. Cohen sought reimbursement of those expenses and Mr. Trump fully reimbursed Cohen in 2017. The category of the value would be $100,001 to $250,000 ..."
- May 24, 2018: Daniels's lawyer Avenatti filed a motion in federal court to have a judge allow Daniels's lawsuit to move forward, instead of continuing the 90-day hold placed last month. Avenatti cited recent statements by Trump and Giuliani, that potentially contradict Cohen's argument for the stay, with the recent disclosure of the Settlement Agreement and the "new facts call into question whether Mr. Cohen's Fifth Amendment rights ..." in relation to the case are "as compelling as previously argued ..."

==== June ====
- June 6, 2018: Daniels sued both Michael Cohen and her own former lawyer, Keith Davidson, accusing Cohen of encouraging Davidson to violate her attorney–client privilege. The lawsuit also alleges Trump was aware of the efforts for Daniels to deny the affair on media interviews.
- June 6, 2018: Trump's lawyer, Rudy Giuliani, verbally attacked Daniels, saying: "The business you were in entitles you to no degree of giving your credibility any weight ... Explain to me how she could be damaged ... If you're going to sell your body for money, you just don't have a reputation ... a woman who sells her body for sexual exploitation I don't respect".
- June 19, 2018: Daniels's May 24 motion to reconsider denied. Avenatti said he would file an appeal shortly.

==== July 2018 ====
- July 12, 2018: Undercover vice cops arrested Daniels in a sting operation in Columbus, Ohio. Officers alleged that Daniels "touched" three undercover officers in the club where she performed, which is against Ohio law. Two other female adult entertainers who were arrested at the club for the same alleged violations received summons to appear in court and did not have their mugshots taken, unlike Daniels while she was booked into the county jail. Daniels retained Columbus defense lawyer Chase Mallory, who worked with prosecutors to dismiss the charges less than 12 hours later, citing that the law excluded out-of-town performers. It later reported that the lead detective on the vice squad in charge of the arrest was a supporter of Trump.

==== August ====
- August 21, 2018: Cohen officially surrendered to the FBI. He pleaded guilty to eight charges that afternoon: five counts of tax evasion, one count of making false statements to a financial institution, one count of willfully causing an unlawful corporate contribution, and one count of making an excessive campaign contribution at the request of a candidate or campaign. The plea deal reportedly does not include any agreement to cooperate with investigators. However, the plea includes both jail time and a substantial monetary fine. Cohen implicated Trump, but not identified him by name, in his plea. Daniels said she felt "vindicated" following the plea. It was also specified that Cohen had requested a reimbursement of $180,000, which Trump Organization officials doubled and added a bonus of $60,000 for a total payment of $420,000.
- August 22, 2018: The New York Times reported that Cohen court documents revealed that two senior Trump Organization executives also involved in the hush-money payments, and that Cohen "coordinated with one or more members of the campaign, including through meetings and phone calls" about the payments.
- August 23, 2018: Trump said the payment funds came from him personally and not from campaign funds during a Fox & Friends interview. He also said that he only knew about the payments "later on". These comments contradict earlier statements that Cohen gave while under oath. Cohen's lawyer Lanny Davis suggested that Trump be prosecuted for the crimes that he instructed Cohen to commit.

==== September ====
- September 7, 2018: Cohen offered to rescind and invalidate the non-disclosure agreement with Daniels, in return for Daniels refunding the $130,000 Cohen paid to her.
- September 8, 2018: Trump's lawyers declared that he would neither enforce the non-disclosure agreement nor contest Daniels's claim that it is invalid.
- September 10, 2018: Michael Avenatti argued lawsuit over 2016 non-disclosure agreement must be allowed to proceed in federal court since neither President Trump nor his former personal attorney has faced "any true consequences or a meaningful inquiry into the truth" in the case.
- September 12, 2018: Stormy Daniels announced a book titled Full Disclosure about her life that she says will include details of her tryst with Donald Trump.

==== October ====
- October 15, 2018: Federal judge S. James Otero dismissed Daniels's defamation lawsuit against President Trump. He also ruled that Trump was entitled to receive attorney's fees from Daniels. Daniels's attorney Michael Avenatti immediately appealed to the U.S. Court of Appeals for the Ninth Circuit.

==== November ====
- November 9, 2018: The Wall Street Journal reported that federal prosecutors have evidence of Trump's "central role" in payments to both Stormy Daniels and Karen McDougal that violated campaign-finance laws.

==== December ====
- December 7, 2018: Federal prosecutors implicated Trump in directing Cohen to commit the campaign finance law felonies Cohen pleaded guilty to in a sentencing memorandum for Cohen. Trump tweeted shortly after the memorandum court filing, "Totally clears the president. Thank you!"
- December 11, 2018: Daniels was ordered to pay $293,052.33 in attorney's fees, costs, and sanctions, less than half the amount demanded by Trump's lawyers, in relation to the defamation lawsuit that Judge Otero dismissed in October 2018.
- December 12, 2018: Cohen was sentenced to three years' imprisonment for having paid $130,000 hush money (characterized in the charges as an "excessive campaign contribution") to Daniels during Trump's election campaign.

=== 2019 ===
==== May ====
- May 6, 2019: Cohen began his prison term in a federal prison in Otisville, New York.

==== July ====
- July 17, 2019: The federal investigation into the hush payments announced as closed.
- July 18, 2019: Unsealed documents released, and show that the FBI suspected that Trump talked to both Cohen and Hope Hicks at the time about "the need" to keep Daniels from going public before the presidential election.

==== August ====
- August 1, 2019: The New York County district attorney subpoenaed the Trump Organization for records related to the hush-money payments.

==== September ====
- September 2, 2019: The House Judiciary Committee prepared to investigate Trump's alleged involvement in the 2016 hush-money payments to both Daniels and Karen McDougal.
- September 11, 2019: NBC and CNN reported that Cohen entered into a proffer agreement with the Manhattan prosecutor to provide information on the matter.

=== 2020 ===
==== August ====
- August 1, 2020: Daniels lost her appeal in the defamation lawsuit against Trump.
- August 22, 2020: A California judge ordered Trump to pay Daniels's legal fees as the prevailing party due to his September 2018 agreement not to enforce the NDA.

==== November ====
- November 3, 2020: Trump lost the 2020 United States Presidential Election.

=== 2021 ===
==== January ====
- January 20, 2021: Trump officially leaves office as president.

==== February ====
- February 22, 2021: The Supreme Court declined to take up the defamation case, making Daniels's loss final.

==== May ====
- May 6, 2021: The FEC dropped an inquiry into whether the payment to Stormy Daniels violated campaign financial law during the 2016 election. The FEC split 2–2 along party lines on taking action. The vote came months after an internal report recommended that there was "reason to believe" Trump's campaign had knowingly violated campaign finance law.

=== 2022 ===
==== March ====
- March 18, 2022: The 9th Circuit (U.S. District Court for the Central District of California) responded to an appeal on the final ruling in Daniels's lawsuit against Trump, wherein she owes nearly $300,000 in attorney fees, costs, and sanctions (not including appeal costs) to the injured party. Allegations of an affair remain unproven, and the final court ruling on the matter was affirmed by the USCA asserting that Stephanie Clifford has suffered a loss in court, owing damages, leaving no merit for further appeal on the matter.
  - Upon the ruling against Daniels, she tweeted "I will go to jail before I pay a penny."
- March 22, 2022: Former President Donald Trump called the ruling "a total and complete victory and vindication for, and of me." He also reiterated his initial claim that he never had sex with Daniels, and claimed that the lawsuit was purely a political stunt.

==== November ====
- November 21, 2022: The New York Times reported that Manhattan district attorney Alvin Bragg's office "has moved to jump-start its criminal investigation into Donald J. Trump['s]" reported "hush-money payment to a porn star who said she had an affair with Mr. Trump."

=== 2023 ===
==== January ====
- January 17, 2023: Michael Cohen met with Bragg's office following the sentencing of Allen Weisselberg.
- January 30, 2023: The Manhattan district attorney's office was scheduled to present evidence to a grand jury regarding Trump's role in the payment.
- January 31, 2023: Trump wrote on Truth Social that "the 'Stormy' nonsense ... is VERY OLD & happened a long time ago. ... there was NO reason not to rely on [Cohen], and I did." Daniels asserted that this was an admission to the truth of her claims.

==== February ====
- February 1, 2023: Cohen said he had given his cellphones to the DA's prosecutors, who wanted evidence of communications, including voice recordings, of Daniels's former lawyer Keith Davidson.

==== March ====
- March 18, 2023: Trump stated that he expected to be placed under arrest the following Tuesday (March 21), on unspecified charges at the behest of New York prosecutors.
- March 30, 2023: A grand jury voted to indict Donald Trump on more than 30 charges related to business fraud. Trump's attorney Joe Tacopina suggested a New York surrender and arraignment the following week.

==== April ====
- April 4, 2023: The 9th Circuit dismissed Daniels's challenge to over $121,000 in fees from a firm representing Trump, which were related to her unsuccessful defamation suit.

==== June ====
- June 2, 2023: Trump's attorneys requested that Judge Juan Manuel Merchan recuse himself from his New York City criminal case due to what they described as anti-Trump bias and a conflict of interest stemming from Merchan's daughter's association with some of Trump's Democratic opponents.

=== 2024 ===
==== May ====
The court case regarding this incident and its aftermath, Prosecution of Donald Trump in New York, was decided on May 30, 2024, against Trump.

== See also ==
- 2017–18 United States political sexual scandals
- Clinton–Lewinsky scandal
- Karen McDougal § Affair with Donald Trump
- Reactions to the prosecution of Donald Trump in New York
