= Prosecution of the Trump Organization in New York =

American criminal investigation

People v. Trump Corporation
- Court: Supreme Court of the State of New York County of New York
- Full case name: The People of the State of New York v. The Trump Corporation, d/b/a The Trump Organization, Trump Payroll Corp., d/b/a The Trump Organization, Allen Weisselberg
- Defendants: The Trump Corporation, Trump Payroll Corporation, and Allen Weisselberg

People v. Trump Corporation is a state criminal case in New York. In July 2021, an indictment was issued against three defendants: the Trump Corporation and the Trump Payroll Corporation, both constituent entities of the Trump Organization; and Allen Weisselberg, Chief Financial Officer of the Trump Organization. All defendants were charged with scheme to defraud, conspiracy, tax fraud, and falsifying business records, and Weisselberg was additionally charged with grand larceny and offering a false instrument for filing.

In August 2022, Weisselberg pleaded guilty to 15 felonies and agreed to testify against the organization in a plea deal. On December 6, the organization was convicted of all 17 criminal charges, and fined the maximum allowable $1.6 million.

== Background ==
In January 2017, ahead of Trump's inauguration as U.S. president, his attorney Sheri Dillon announced that the Trump Organization's businesses would be transferred to a trust controlled by Trump's sons Donald Jr. and Eric Trump, as well as longtime chief financial officer (CFO) Allen Weisselberg.

In August 2018, Manhattan District Attorney (DA) Cyrus Vance Jr. was reported to be considering a criminal investigation of the organization and two of its senior executives for their reimbursement of then-Trump personal attorney Michael Cohen for his hush-money payment to Stormy Daniels; the organization recorded the reimbursement as a legal expense although Cohen did no legal work in the matter. In August 2019, Vance subpoenaed the organization's accountants, Mazars, for Trump's tax returns. In July 2020, the U.S. Supreme Court ruled that Trump's tax records could be released to prosecutors, producing millions of pages of documents, reportedly including Trump's returns from January 2011 to August 2019. In November 2022, the DA's office (then under Alvin Bragg) was reportedly again scrutinizing the hush-money affair in a possible move towards mounting a criminal case against Trump. A former president had never before been criminally indicted. (Note: Congress dropped its impeachment proceedings against Richard Nixon after he resigned in August 1974 and he was pardoned the next month for any crimes he may have committed while in office.) At the end of the month, following a Supreme Court ruling, the U.S. Treasury Department released Trump's returns from 2015 to 2020 to the House Ways and Means Committee. The committee subsequently voted to make these public.

The Manhattan DA suggested in an August 2020 federal court filing that the organization was under investigation for bank and insurance fraud. That November, The New York Times reported that both investigators had recently issued subpoenas to the organization regarding tax deductions on millions of dollars in consulting fees, some of which were apparently paid to Ivanka Trump. By December 2020, the Manhattan DA had interviewed employees of Aon and Deutsche Bank, and hired FTI Consulting to provide forensic analysis to determine whether the organization had altered asset values for financial gain.

The first grand jury resulted in charges against Weisselberg, who subsequently provided testimony against the organization, which was in turn used to convict two subsidiary companies. After the sentencing of the companies on January 13, 2023, Bragg stated that the broader investigation of the organization would continue.

== Investigation ==
On May 18, 2021, the office of the New York State Attorney General (OAG) announced that it was joining the Manhattan DA's office in probing the organization "in a criminal capacity." The Manhattan DA convened a special grand jury to consider indicting Trump, his company and/or executives. Jeffrey McConney, a senior vice president and controller who had worked for almost 35 years at the company, testified before the grand jury after being subpoenaed. The Daily Beast later reported that McConney claimed not to have known that fringe benefits should be reported as income.

By June 2021, Allen Weisselberg and chief operating officer (COO) Matthew Calamari Sr. were under scrutiny of the Manhattan DA investigation. On June 25, the ex-wife of Allen Weisselberg's son Barry (who worked for the organization), Jennifer Weisselberg, reportedly told investigators that in January 2012 she witnessed Donald Trump discuss fringe benefits with her then-husband and father-in-law. Trump allegedly indicated that he would provide tuition for Barry and Jennifer's children at a top-rated private school (ultimately costing over $50,000 a year per child) instead of giving the two employees a raise, and directly told Jennifer that he would cover this cost. On June 28, she stated that she was planning to provide testimony in the case.

== Indictment and charges ==
On July 1, 2021, an indictment was issued against three defendants: the Trump Corporation, a constituent entity of the Trump Organization that employed a group of its senior managers; the Trump Payroll Corporation, which issued paychecks to Trump Organization staff; and Allen Weisselberg, Chief Financial Officer of the Trump Organization. All three defendants were each charged with:

- Scheme to defraud in the first degree (Penal Law § 190.65(1)(b))
- Conspiracy in the fourth degree (Penal Law § 105.10(1))
- Four counts of criminal tax fraud in the third degree (Tax Law § 1804)
- Four counts of falsifying business records in the first degree (Penal Law § 175.10))

In addition, Weisselberg was charged with:

- Grand larceny in the second degree (Penal Law § 155.40(1))
- Four counts of offering a false instrument for filing in the first degree (Penal Law § 175.35(1))

Prosecutors alleged that Weisselberg received about $1.76 million in undeclared indirect compensation in the form of free rent and utilities, car leases for himself and his wife, and school tuition for his grandchildren (the checks for which Trump allegedly signed). They further allege that the organization kept track of the fringe benefits on internal spreadsheets and did not report them as taxable income. Both the organization and Weisselberg pleaded not guilty.

On July 8, the organization removed Weisselberg as director of the company running Trump International Golf Links, Scotland, and on July 9, it removed him as director of 40 subsidiaries registered in Florida.

== Pre-trial proceedings ==
The organization and Weisselberg next appeared in court on September 20. Weisselberg's lawyer revealed that over 3 million documents had been discovered in the basement of an unidentified co-conspirator, including tax documents related to the organization, and announced that "We have strong reason to believe there could be other indictments coming." Weisselberg's defense team asked for more time to review the documents. The judge agreed to this request and tentatively set a trial date for about a year in the future. Prosecutors reportedly hoped that Weisselberg would provide testimony against Donald Trump in exchange for a reduced or rescinded sentence. This refusal reportedly led to the indictment of Weisselberg, the Trump Corporation and Trump Payroll Corporation. New York AG Letitia James later reported that, like Eric Trump in his testimony for her investigation, Weisselberg had invoked his Fifth Amendment right against self-incrimination over 500 times.

As of mid-August, prosecutors were reportedly negotiating with a lawyer for Calamari Sr. to discuss his cooperation. Matthew Calamari Jr., who heads security for the organization, was subpoenaed on August 31 to testify before the grand jury; both he and Jeffrey McConney were expected to testify on September 2. In October, Manhattan judge Juan Merchan held a trial regarding the organization's failure to comply with four grand jury subpoenas and three court orders; on this basis, in December, Merchan held the company in contempt of court and ordered the Trump Corporation and Trump Payroll Corporation to pay $4,000 in fines. The ruling remained sealed until December 2022 to avoid influencing the trial.

Later in October 2021, Trump testified in Galicia v. Trump that he personally oversaw Calamari Sr.'s compensation. As of November 2021, the lawyer for the Calamaris expected no charges to be brought against Calamari Sr. The original grand jury was expected to remain convened until that month.

On February 22, 2022, lawyers for the organization and Weisselberg filed motions requesting that the Manhattan DA's criminal investigation be dismissed, alleging "political animus". Weisselberg's lawyers argued that the charges against him were related to federal taxes and that he had been granted federal immunity due to his cooperation in the case against Cohen (who allegedly recommended prosecutors try to flip Weisselberg against Trump); his lawyers further claimed that prosecutors had threatened to charge Weisselberg's son Barry (a former Trump Organization employee who was allegedly provided unreported fringe benefits) and requested that evidence from two prosecutors be suppressed because it was improperly divulged while Weisselberg was in custody.

On April 26, a court filing related to Galicia v. Trump revealed that Trump had admitted to overseeing Calamari Sr.'s compensation and The Daily Beast reported that prosecutors had spent months probing Calamari Sr.'s fringe benefits, even offering immunity to Calamari Jr. in exchange for testimony.

In a court filing made public on May 23, prosecutors for the DA asked a judge to uphold the criminal charges against the organization and Weisselberg, except for the charge of criminal tax evasion against the latter due to a missed deadline. The filing clarified that the investigation preceded Cohen's cooperation in the case, the defendants having argued that it was spurred by a "vendetta" of his. According to prosecutors for the DA, Cohen overstated his role in the proceedings against Trump.

On August 12, 2022 (one month later than expected), lawyers for the organization and Weisselberg appeared before Judge Merchan to discuss pretrial matters. Merchan agreed to dismiss one charge against the company as the statute of limitations had lapsed.

=== Weisselberg guilty plea ===
On August 18, Weisselberg pleaded guilty to 15 felonies and agreed to testify against the organization in a plea deal in which he is set to serve five months in prison followed by five years of probation and must pay nearly $2 million in back taxes, interest, and penalties. Had he not taken the plea agreement, he faced 5 to 15 years in prison.

Bragg argued that the plea "directly implicates the Trump Organization in a wide range of criminal activity", while the organization refused a plea deal, reportedly because the DA wanted it to plead guilty to felonies while Trump lawyers suggested a plea to a misdemeanor, and Trump himself reputedly rejected taking any plea because of the negative political impact implied and/or it requiring the two corporate entities under indictment, the Trump Corporation and Trump Payroll Corporation, to say their employees knowingly engaged in tax fraud. The organization asserted that the corporate entities would plead not guilty as they had "done nothing wrong".

On September 12, Merchan set a week for either side to file additional motions and stated that he would not allow the organization or Weisselberg "in any way to bring up a selective prosecution claim, or claim this is some sort of novel prosecution".

== Trial ==
Jury selection began on October 24, 2022, as Merchan had ordered, and continued through October 28. Of 132 candidates, about half were dismissed (some due to potential bias regarding the defense or prosecution) and seven jurors were chosen. Trump lawyers used two of their peremptory challenges.

Opening statements began October 31. On that day, prosecutors stated that Weisselberg would provide the "inside story" of the company's use of fringe benefits, asserting that he had ordered payments to be deleted from ledgers following Trump's election as U.S. president. Lawyers for the organization accused Weisselberg of lying and claimed that he profited from the company without its or Trump's knowledge.

Jeffrey McConney testified that he deducted the cost of items such as apartments, car leases and cash from gross salaries, resulting in lower tax payments. He stated that he was afraid he would be fired if he told Trump about schemes benefiting Weisselberg and Calamari Sr. Additionally, McConney said that after Trump's election, attorney Sheri Dillon oversaw an overhaul of the organization's tax practices. McConney testified that a page of Trump's personal ledger from 2012 (provided by Mazars) had been altered to remove Weisselberg's name from a payment of over $30,000 to a private school (on a copy provided by the organization to a Manhattan jury in 2021). McConney later testified that he "knew it wasn't correct [but] wasn't sure it was illegal" to pay Weisselberg's wife $6,000 for a job she did not perform so she could gain Social Security benefits and that he was afraid he would lose his job if he told others about his work for Weisselberg related to fringe benefits. Both McConney and Weisselberg said they relied on Mazars accountant Donald Bender, who served the organization for a number of years, to assure the legality of their actions.

McConney was declared a hostile witness, and subsequently, evidence was presented that the company provided a number of people (including Allen and Barry Weisselberg) benefits logged as payments for independent contract work. According to Weisselberg, these bonuses were drawn from subsidiary entities such as Mar-a-Lago and Trump Productions, which deducted them as expenses. Weisselberg testified that this scheme was amongst a number of illegal tax practices the organization ceased around the time of Trump's election. Weisselberg said he and McConney altered the former's payroll record to deduct the cost of bonuses and that they falsified W-2 forms. Weisselberg stated that some fringe payments to employees were as high as $100,000 and that this practice had been performed via Form 1099 since the 1980s. He testified that he received $1.76 million in untaxed benefits and that Trump authorized the compensation for him and other senior executives. Weisselberg testified that the Trumps did not know about his scheme to dodge taxes by using his paychecks to reimburse the organization for tuition checks for his grandchildren, which were signed by Donald Trump and (in 2017) Donald Jr. When asked, Weisselberg stated that "I committed [the tax-fraud] crimes with Jeffrey McConney [whom] I dealt with directly [as well as the] Trump Corporation and Trump Payroll Corporation." Weisselberg went on to testify that in 2017, after Eric and Donald Trump Jr. learned of his scheme, he used its cessation to negotiate a raise from them—procuring an additional $200,000 starting in 2019.

On November 21, the prosecution rested its case, opting not to call as a witness Donald Bender, who had been granted immunity for previously providing testimony. The defense began the same day, calling Bender to the stand and presenting documents potentially suggesting his partial awareness of company executives receiving fringe benefits reported as independent contract work. On November 28, Merchan denied the defense's request to introduce filings made the preceding night. Bender testified that Weisselberg claimed to meet the requirements to be paid as an independent contractor. He further testified that the two corporate entities and some employees had lowered their taxes via the payment of bonuses as if it was for consulting work. After being shown the company's general ledger, on which perks provided to Weisselberg and other executives were apparently obvious, Bender stated that it was not his responsibility to review. When asked, Bender said he did "an amazing job" for the company. The defense attempted to discredit him as a witness and the same day, rested its case. Merchan declined to rule on a motion to dismiss the charges against the defense.

Two days of closing arguments began on December 1. Early in the defense's presentation, prosecutors objected to the inclusion of excerpts of witness testimony that had been stricken from the record, which the judge ordered to be removed. The defense argued that Weisselberg acted "solely to benefit himself", with only McConney and Bender sharing his fault. Contrarily, the prosecution asserted that ample evidence showed that Weisselberg intended to benefit the company (to a lesser extent than himself), with McConney helping him and another executive lower their salaries and use the pre-tax savings to pay for perks on the company's behalf—as well as lower its payroll costs and payroll taxes related to Medicare. The prosecution highlighted a secret log McConney used to track reduced salaries and corresponding perks requested by Weisselberg and others, leading to separate books being provided to the Internal Revenue Service (IRS). According to the prosecution, the organization saved $3.5 million from Weisselberg's scheme and at a certain point benefited more from it than him. The prosecution implied that Weisselberg may be protecting the organization to ensure a future bonus payment from his employer. The prosecution further alleged that Donald Trump was aware of the fraudulent schemes and that he "explicitly [sanctioned] tax fraud", citing a 2012 document with his signature authorizing a reduction of Calamari Sr.'s salary by $72,000 (the same amount as his Park Avenue apartment rent), but said proving Trump's knowledge was unnecessary to implicate the company. The defense both made an objection to the accusation, which Merchan sustained (although he ruled that the accusation was fair for the prosecution to have mentioned), and used it to call for a mistrial, which the judge denied.

After denying requests by the defense to treat Trump's tuition payments for Weisselberg's grandchildren as gifts and to have a corporate liability law declared "constitutionally vague", Merchan instructed jurors regarding the application of New York's corporate liability law to their verdict. The jury began deliberations on December 5. Per New York law, the jury had to find that Weisselberg (and/or McConney) acted "in behalf of" the organization in order to declare it guilty of Weisselberg's crimes; according to Merchan, this required it to be shown that "there was some intent to benefit the corporation" but this need not have been Weisselberg's main goal. About 400 exhibits were presented as evidence, some thousands of pages long. According to one juror, the jury referred to Trump as "Smith" to reduce bias and suspected that he and his family likely knew about the fraud scheme. The jury reputedly found defense lawyer Michael van der Veen's argument that "Weisselberg did it for Weisselberg" demeaning, comparing the statement negatively to the defense's argument in the O. J. Simpson murder case that "If it doesn't fit, you must acquit". The jury further reportedly found van der Veen's mockery of Bender's voice and speech impediment "small-minded and unnecessary" and thought McConney's verbosity during his testimony for the defense (as compared to his quietude for the prosecution) likely constituted "incompetent lying" meant to stonewall the prosecution. The jury unanimously found the organization guilty of fraud and carefully considered each charge.

== Verdict and sentencing ==
On December 6, the organization was convicted of all 17 criminal charges it faced, nine for the Trump Corporation and eight for the Trump Payroll Corporation. The defense said it would appeal the verdict. On January 10, 2023, Weisselberg was sentenced in accordance with his plea deal.

On January 13, the organization was fined the maximum allowable $1.6 million (with three charges for tax fraud plus several others for offenses such as conspiracy and falsifying business records). The organization could be further impacted by banks and businesses which have internal policies against dealing with felons.

== See also ==
- Personal and business legal affairs of Donald Trump
