= Keith Davidson =

American attorney

- Born: Brockton, Massachusetts, U.S.
- Education: Boston College (BS); Whittier College (JD)
- Occupation: Trial attorney
- Years active: 2000–present
- Known for: Cases involving celebrity sex tapes; formerly representing Stormy Daniels
- Website: kmdlaw.com

Keith M. Davidson is an American attorney in California. He has represented clients who sought nondisclosure agreement settlements from notable individuals, including Donald Trump, Charlie Sheen, and Hulk Hogan. He has also managed professional boxers Manny Pacquiao and James Toney.

== Early life and education ==
Davidson was born and raised in Brockton, Massachusetts. He studied economics at Boston College and graduated in 1994. While attending the school, he could not afford to stay on campus, and arranged with a high school friend to sleep in a dormitory closet of a six-bed suite. He later moved to California, where he attended Whittier Law School in Costa Mesa, California and passed the California bar exam in 2000.

== Career ==
Davidson worked for the state legislature and the Plymouth County district attorney's office before relocating to California to attend law school. After passing the bar, he started out in criminal law before switching over to civil law, with a focus on the entertainment industry. He helped manage and negotiate for professional boxers James Toney and Manny Pacquiao in the 2000s. He represented a woman who sold a sex tape of herself with actor Verne Troyer in 2008, and was sued for trying to sell a video of Tila Tequila, which was ultimately settled.

He has operated a law firm in Beverly Hills for nearly 20 years, as of 2018. He has been involved in numerous lawsuits for and against celebrities, including against himself, as well as resolving scandals with payoff settlements. He was suspended from the California state bar in 2010 for ninety days for professional misconduct in three cases. He originally represented porn star Stormy Daniels when she wanted a story of the scandal with Trump removed from a gossip website in 2011, which was the first time he was in contact with Donald Trump's attorney Michael Cohen, which Davidson said did not go well at first. He attempted to sell sex tapes of Hulk Hogan back to him for a million dollars, which led to an investigation by the FBI in 2012 for extortion, but Davidson was never charged. Hogan sued Davidson over claims of extortion and invasion of privacy.

He helped 1998 Playboy Playmate of the Year Karen McDougal sell the story of her affair with Trump to the National Enquirer for $150,000, which was not published, and later arranged the $130,000 hush money payment Trump made to Daniels. Both later changed attorneys and attempted to overturn their nondisclosure agreements. McDougal accused Davidson in a court filing of colluding with Cohen. Daniels' attorney at the time, Michael Avenatti, criticized Davidson for speaking to the press regarding former clients. Davidson acknowledged speaking with Cohen before the 2016 election about the case with McDougal, despite neither Trump nor Cohen being involved, calling it a "professional courtesy". Cohen also asked Davidson about Daniels' bringing back allegations about an affair with Trump in 2006, and asked him to look into it, which led to the $130,000 payoff.

He cooperated with federal authorities during their investigation of Cohen in 2018, after records including calls taped by Cohen between the two were seized, according to a CNN report. A spokesman for Davidson said the recordings were not authorized. He also represented Playboy model Shera Bechard in a $1.6 million agreement with Republican fundraiser Elliott Broidy, who was represented by Cohen.

Cohen said Davidson was a "tired advocate for his clients".

== Personal life ==
Davidson is married to Kristi, a registered nurse. They lost two houses to foreclosure and faced tax liens from the IRS and California.

== See also ==
- 2017–18 United States political sexual scandals
- List of Boston College people
- Personal and business legal affairs of Donald Trump
