= Juan Merchan =

American judge in the state of New York (born 1962/1963)

Justice of the New York Supreme Court
- Acting
- Assumed office 2009
- Appointed by: Ann Pfau

Personal details
- Born: Juan Manuel Merchan; 1962 or 1963 (age 63–64) Bogotá, Colombia
- Education: Baruch College (BBA); Hofstra University (JD)

Juan Manuel Merchan (born 1962/1963) is an American judge and former prosecutor. He is an acting justice of the New York State Supreme Court in New York County (Manhattan). He presided over the 2024 criminal trial of former US president Donald Trump, in which Trump was found guilty by the jury.

== Early life and education ==
Merchan was born in Bogotá, Colombia. He immigrated to New York City when he was six years old, growing up in Jackson Heights, Queens, as the youngest of six children. His father had been a military officer in Colombia. Merchan studied business at Baruch College in Manhattan, graduating in 1990, and earned his Juris Doctor from Hofstra University School of Law on Long Island in 1994. He was the first member of his family to go to college.

== Career as prosecutor ==
In 1994, Merchan began his career as an assistant district attorney in the Manhattan district attorney's office. He worked in the office's Trial Division and Investigations Division, prosecuting financial frauds and other cases. From 1999 to 2006, he worked for the New York State Attorney General's office, first as Deputy Attorney General in-Charge, Nassau County Region (1999–2001), then as Assistant Attorney General in-Charge of Affirmative Litigation for Nassau and Suffolk Counties (2003–2006), and then as Assistant Attorney General in-Charge Nassau County Region (2003–2006).

== Career as judge ==
Merchan became a judge in 2006 when New York City mayor Michael Bloomberg appointed him to the New York City Family Court, Bronx County. He remained in that role until 2009. Chief administrative judge Ann Pfau appointed Merchan as acting justice in the Supreme Court of New York, New York County, Criminal, in 2009, and he has been in that position since that time. Merchan presides over felony criminal trials. Merchan also previously served concurrently as a judge of the New York Court of Claims, being appointed to that role by Governor David Paterson in 2009 and serving until 2018.

=== First criminal trial of a former president ===
Justice Merchan was the judge in The People of the State of New York v. Donald J. Trump, concerning former U.S. president Donald Trump, who was criminally indicted on 34 felony counts, making Merchan the first judge in history to preside in the criminal indictment of a US president. The indictment of Trump was delivered by a grand jury on March 30, 2023. It was unsealed the same day, with Trump pleading not guilty. The jury trial began on April 15, 2024, and on April 30, Merchan held Trump in contempt of court, making him the first judge in history to hold a US president in criminal contempt of court.

During the trial, former president Donald Trump called Merchan's daughter, who heads a digital marketing agency that works with Democratic Party candidates and non-profits, "a rabid Trump hater, who has admitted to having conversations with her father about me." Trump demanded a new judge, but prosecutors asserted that Trump's allegation amounted to a "daisy chain of innuendos [that] is a far cry from evidence," and Merchan did not recuse himself from the case.

Reactions to Merchan’s management of this Trump trial were varied. For example, on May 21, 2024, Congresswoman Elise Stefanik of New York filed an ethics complaint against Merchan, alleging a conflict of interest. The attorney and legal commentator Elie Honig wrote that, generally speaking, "Judge Merchan has done an exceptional job running this trial thus far", and is a "thoroughly impressive jurist" but he should nevertheless recuse himself. George Grasso, a retired New York City administrative judge who supervised other judges, wrote, "As a retiree, I was able to attend each day of the Trump trial. What I saw was a master class in what a judge should be — how one can serve fairly and impartially for the prosecution and the defense, and above all remain a pillar for the rule of law in America." Merchan received dozens of death threats for his role as the judge presiding over Trump's arraignment and criminal trial.

On May 30, the case ended in a conviction on all counts. Originally, Trump's sentencing was scheduled by Merchan to take place on July 11, 2024. This was delayed to September 18, 2024, following the Supreme Court's ruling in Trump v. United States that granted presumptive immunity to former presidents for official acts while in office. On September 6, 2024, Merchan postponed the sentencing and scheduled it to take place after the presidential election on November 26, 2024, with his stated reason being that he wanted to avoid the appearance of a politically motivated sentencing.

On January 3, 2025, Merchan set a sentencing date for January 10, indirectly signaling that Trump would not face any penalties. Even so, Trump's spokesperson and supporters reacted angrily.

=== Other notable cases ===
In 2011, Merchan presided over the case of a New York Police Department sergeant, William Eiseman, who admitted to conducting illegal searches and then lying about his actions in court. Eiseman pleaded guilty to first-degree perjury and official misconduct, and Merchan sentenced him to 24 days in jail; Eiseman also forfeited his pension.

In 2012, Merchan presided over the criminal proceedings against Anna Gristina, who was charged with operating an upscale prostitution ring on the Upper East Side. Gristina and a co-defendant had been arrested in February 2012, after an investigation by the Manhattan DA's office. Merchan set bail at a $2 million bond, or $1 million cash; because Gristina was unable to meet this amount, she was detained at Rikers Island jail for four months. The Appellate Division lowered Gristina's bail to $250,000 bond or $125,000 cash, on condition that she give up her passport and be electronically monitored. Gristina, nicknamed the "Soccer Mom Madam", pleaded guilty to one count of promoting prostitution, and Merchan sentenced her to six months in jail, which amounted to time already served due to the four months Gristina had spent at Rikers before being bailed.

In late 2022, Merchan oversaw the five-week criminal trial of the Trump Organization; the organization was convicted of 17 counts of tax fraud. Merchan presided over the criminal case of Donald Trump's former financial chief Allen Weisselberg, who pleaded guilty to his role in a 15-year-long tax-fraud scheme. Weisselberg admitted to evading taxes by accepting $1.7 million in off-the-books compensation and entered a plea agreement, in which he testified against The Trump Organization and helped to secure the company's conviction. Merchan sentenced Weisselberg to five months at Rikers Island and said he would have imposed a substantially longer sentence but for the plea agreement.

Merchan was assigned to preside over the criminal trial of Steve Bannon, a former Trump adviser who was indicted in September 2022 on charges of fraud and money laundering in connection with a fundraising scheme. The case was set for trial in May 2024, postponed until September, and reassigned to Judge April Newbauer in June because of a scheduling conflict. In February 2025, Bannon pleaded guilty to one state felony count of fraud and was sentenced to a three-year conditional discharge.

== Political donations ==
During the 2020 United States presidential election, Merchan donated $15 to Democratic Party candidate Joe Biden's campaign, $9 to the Progressive Turnout Project, and $10 to Stop Republicans, a subsidiary of the Progressive Turnout Project.

== Trump administration investigation of daughter's firm ==
In August 2025, Andrew S. Boutros, the U.S. attorney of the Northern District of Illinois, subpoenaed the Democratic fund-raising firm, whose vice president was Merchan's daughter Loren until late 2024, for internal communications with clients that included former vice president Kamala Harris, former president Joe Biden, Governor Kathy Hochul of New York, Representative Hakeem Jeffries of New York, and the Democratic National Committee. Prosecutors later limited the subpoena to a $468 payment from Harris's 2024 presidential campaign and emails between Merchan and his daughter. According to the New York Times, the "language in the subpoena is virtually identical to claims made" by a House committee that Trump's conviction in the hush-money trial was "potentially politically motivated".

== See also ==
- List of Hispanic and Latino American jurists
