= Shera Bechard =

Canadian 2010 Playboy Playmate

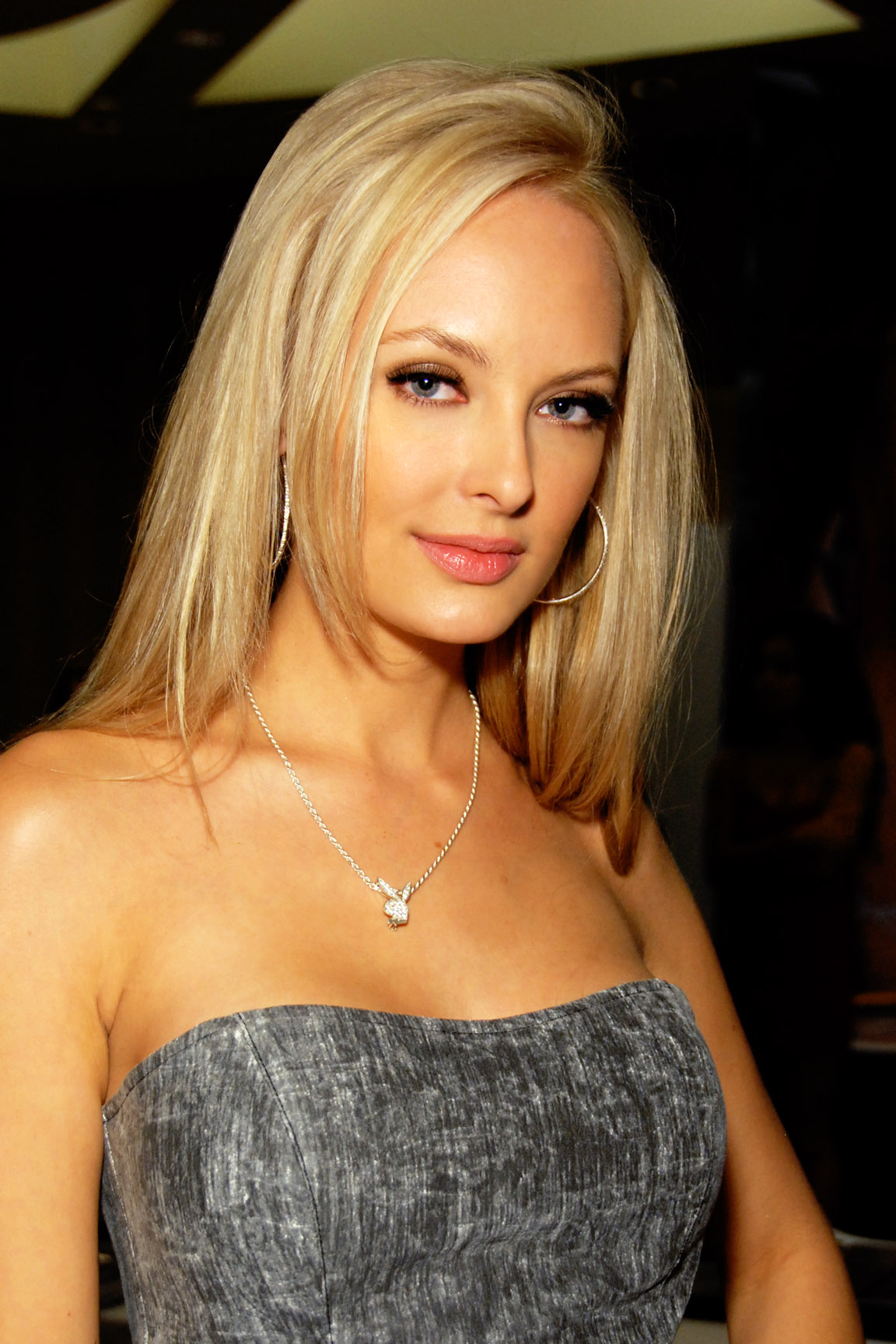
- Bechard in 2010
- Born: Shera Lorraine Marie Bechard; September 14, 1983 (age 43); Kapuskasing, Ontario
- Occupation: Model
- Height: 5 ft 6 in (168 cm)

Shera Lorraine Marie Bechard (born September 14, 1983) is a Canadian model who was Playboy Playmate of the Month for November 2010.

== Biography ==
Bechard was born and raised in Kapuskasing, Ontario. She moved to Toronto at age 18 to pursue modelling.

She played the lead role in the 2009 Canadian crime film Sweet Karma. When Bechard attended the 2010 Toronto Comic Arts Festival, she had her portrait drawn by cartoonist Doug Sneyd, who proceeded to say she should appear in Playboy, where his cartoons were regularly published. Bechard sent some of her pictures to Sneyd, and two weeks later she participated in a test shoot that led her to become the Playmate of the month for November. In 2011, she became romantically involved with Playboy founder Hugh Hefner.

The Wall Street Journal reported in April 2018 that Bechard was having an affair with Republican fundraiser Elliott Broidy. After becoming pregnant by Broidy in late 2017, Bechard had an abortion. Her lawyer, Keith Davidson, negotiated the payment of US$1.6 million as money for silence through Michael Cohen, U.S. President Donald Trump's lawyer at that time, who had negotiated a similar confidentiality agreement between Trump and Stormy Daniels. However, after making the first two instalment payments, Broidy publicly announced that he would not make any further payments, claiming that her former lawyer Davidson had caused a breach of the agreement by disclosing the affair to Michael Avenatti, who then hinted at it publicly in a late-night tweet. On July 6, 2018, Bechard filed a lawsuit against Broidy, Davidson and Michael Avenatti in California over Broidy's refusal to carry through with the agreement. She also claimed that Davidson had not properly represented her in negotiating the agreement, preferring his financial interest over her own.

== See also ==
- List of Playboy Playmates of the Month
