= Hush money =

Payment for silence

Hush money is an arrangement in which one person or party offers another money or other enticement, in exchange for remaining silent about some illegal, stigmatized, or shameful behavior, act, or other fact about the person or party who has made the offer. It can also be money paid to placate a disgruntled adversary who may disclose embarrassing information, even if untrue, to avoid the harm and trouble of dealing with defamation.

The person or party who presents the hush money may be attempting to avoid criminal prosecution, a lawsuit (as sometimes in the case of an out-of-court settlement), a leak of information to the news media, or silence about a stigmatized issue, politicians and their appointees, or a national government in its standing among other nations in the world. It is usually given "under the table".

Hush money can be money paid in exchange for a non-disclosure agreement. It can also be an agreement to say that something did not happen even though it did, even in court testimony. The latter type of agreement can be a criminal act itself as an obstruction of justice or perjury. The payment of hush money may or may not be illegal, depending on the circumstances.

== Origin ==
The Oxford English Dictionary traces published use of the term to Richard Steele in 1709.

== Specific cases ==
- Bill Cosby sexual assault cases: c. 2006
- Stormy Daniels–Donald Trump scandal: in 2006, Daniels said she had a one-time affair with President Trump. Trump was convicted for how he recorded the payments and those who accepted money testified for the state against him.
  - See also: Donald Trump sexual misconduct allegations
- John Edwards extramarital affair: came to light during the 2008 U.S. presidential election

== See also ==
- Blackmail
- Consciousness of guilt
- Extortion
