= Allen Weisselberg =

American businessman (born 1947)

- Born: Allen Howard Weisselberg; August 15, 1947 (age 79); Brooklyn, New York, U.S.
- Education: Pace University (BS)
- Occupation: Chief financial officer
- Organization: The Trump Organization
- Criminal charges: Tax evasion, Perjury

Allen Howard Weisselberg (born August 15, 1947) is an American businessman who was convicted of tax evasion in connection with his role as former chief financial officer (CFO) of the Trump Organization. Weisselberg served as a co-trustee of a trust set up in 2017 by Donald Trump before Trump's inauguration as president of the United States. In 2022, Weisselberg pleaded guilty to 15 criminal charges including grand larceny, criminal tax fraud and falsifying business records. In January 2023, he began serving a five-month jail sentence and was released the following April. A ruling which was handed down in February 2024 also resulted in Weisselberg being permanently banned from serving in financial control function of any New York corporation or business, and also banned him from serving as a director or officer for any New York corporation or business for three years. In 2024, he pleaded guilty to perjury and was sentenced to another five months in prison, which he immediately began serving in April 2024.

== Early life ==
Weisselberg was born in Brooklyn, New York, and grew up in the borough's Brownsville neighborhood. He is of Jewish descent. He graduated from Thomas Jefferson High School in nearby East New York, before receiving a Bachelor of Science in accounting from Pace University in 1970.

== Career ==
Weisselberg began working as an accountant for Gravesend-based real estate magnate Fred Trump in 1973. By the late 1980s, he was controller of the company (which had relocated its main office to Midtown Manhattan under the auspices of Donald Trump) and reported to Stephen Bollenbach, his predecessor as chief financial officer.

In 2000, Weisselberg was named chief financial officer and vice president of Trump Hotels & Casino Resorts. He also was a board member and treasurer of the Donald J. Trump Foundation. In 2017, Weisselberg said in a deposition to New York State investigators that he was not aware he was a board member "at least for the last 10 or 15 years". He has also handled the household expenses of the Trump family. Along with Donald Trump, he is one of two trustees of a New York-based revocable trust that in turn owns DT Connect Member Corp.

On January 11, 2017, shortly before Donald Trump's inauguration as president of the United States, the Trump Organization announced that Weisselberg would manage the company along with Eric Trump and Donald Trump Jr. during Trump's presidency. A summary of trust arrangements dated February 10, 2018, lists Weisselberg and Donald Trump Jr. as trustees, and Eric Trump as an adviser. The summary also indicated that, as trustees, only Weisselberg and Trump Jr. knew the details of the trust's finances.

On May 2, 2024, the Daily Beast published a story which revealed that Weisselberg was secretly involved in Trump's 2016 presidential campaign.

== Payments to Stormy Daniels and Karen McDougal ==
Michael Cohen, Trump's personal lawyer at the start of his presidency, said that Weisselberg had arranged for the Trump Organization to pay Cohen $35,000 a month, to reimburse him for hush money Trump had asked Cohen to pay adult film actress Stormy Daniels in the weeks before the 2016 election, to keep her from talking publicly about an affair she says she had with Trump. In July 2018, Weisselberg was subpoenaed to testify before a federal grand jury regarding the Cohen investigation. Weisselberg was granted limited witness immunity for his testimony. New York County District Attorney Cyrus Vance Jr. was also investigating Weisselberg. When the federal investigation by the U.S. District Court for the Southern District of New York "effectively concluded" in July 2019, Vance issued new subpoenas in connection with the hush-money payments. Weisselberg's federal immunity does not extend to state investigations. In May 2024, former Trump Organization comptroller Jeffrey McConney testified that Wiesselberg instructed him to make reimbursement payment to Cohen in 2017. It has also been acknowledged that Weisselberg signed some of the reimbursement checks to Cohen.

On May 13, during court testimony, Cohen linked Weisselberg to not only the Stormy Daniels payment, but also to the Karen McDougal hush money payment which was accepted by the National Enquirer to publish McDougal's "catch-and-kill" story. According to Cohen, Weisselberg provided him with the financial advice which inspired him to make the McDougal payment, telling him to not make it through the Trump Organization, but instead find more creative ways to make it. This in turn foreshadowed the way he would make the Daniels payment. Cohen further stated that Weisselberg coordinated the repayment to him after he made the hush money payment for Daniels on Trump's behalf. Notes also revealed Weisselberg’s role in Cohen's reimbursement payments. Cohen also testified that he and Weisselberg personally went into Trump's 26th floor Trump Tower office to discuss the reimbursement payments in the short time after the 2016 election victory.

== Tax fraud conviction ==
In November 2020, Bloomberg News investigative reporter Caleb Melby published a piece that revealed members of Weisselberg's family had lived rent-free in Trump Organization-owned apartments and had received other perks that didn't appear to be taxed. Within days of the story being published, New York authorities obtained and reviewed Weisselberg family tax records. Vance stepped up his state criminal investigation in February 2021, after the US Supreme Court authorized Trump's accountants to turn over Trump's personal and business tax records to him. Vance's office then reportedly focused its investigation on Weisselberg, as well as on Donald Trump Jr. and Eric Trump, allegedly with the goal of pressuring Weisselberg to turn state's evidence and testify against his employer. The New York Times reported that investigators had also asked at least one witness about Weisselberg’s sons—Barry, who had managed Wollman Rink, and Jack, who works at Ladder Capital, a Trump Organization lender. By March 2021, prosecutors were examining financial records of Weisselberg and his family members. His former daughter-in-law Jen Weisselberg, who was married to Barry Weisselberg from 2004 until 2018, released to the Manhattan DA numerous documents that revealed how some Trump employees received compensation in real estate and other items.

CNN reported in May 2021 that the New York state attorney general had opened a criminal tax investigation into Weisselberg months earlier. The investigation was pursued by the Manhattan district attorney's office. In June, a grand jury heard evidence against him. Weisselberg surrendered to the Manhattan district attorney's office in New York City on July 1, 2021, hours before the grand jury's indictments against him and the Trump Organization were unsealed. Weisselberg was charged with 15 felony counts for evading $344,745 in taxes over 15 years. He initially pleaded not guilty, but on August 18, 2022, he pleaded guilty to all 15 counts of grand larceny, criminal tax fraud and falsifying business records. As part of the guilty plea deal, he agreed to testify against The Trump Organization at trial and to pay "almost $2 million in back taxes, interest and penalties and waive any right to appeal."

In November 2022, Weisselberg testified at the Trump Organization's tax fraud trial. He stated that the real estate company cleaned up its tax practices in anticipation of additional scrutiny after Trump entered the White House and left two of his sons, Donald Trump Jr. and Eric Trump, in control. Weisselberg also testified that during the cleanup, Trump's sons knew the company paid executives' personal expenses that were not reported as income, and provided bonuses as if they were independent contractors.

On January 10, 2023, Weisselberg was sentenced to five months in the infirmary unit of Rikers Island, at which point he hired prison consultant Craig Rothfeld. He was released on April 19, 2023.

== New York civil fraud trial ==
On October 10, 2023, Weisselberg testified at the civil fraud trial of the Trump Organization. Regarding Trump's 11,000-square-foot apartment on 5th Avenue that had been misrepresented as being 30,000 square feet, Weisselberg testified, "I never even thought about the apartment." However, he had participated in communications with Forbes between 2009 and 2017 that had led the magazine's reporters to falsely believe the inflated size of the apartment, as Forbes countered in an article two days after his testimony. The civil trial ruling, which was issued in February 2024, resulted in Weisselberg and former Trump Organization controller Jeffrey McConney being the only two defendants who were permanently barred from having financial control in any New York business or corporation.

Mar. 24, 2024, Plea agreement of Allen Weisselberg

On March 4, 2024, Weisselberg pleaded guilty to two counts of perjury in the first degree, related to the testimony he gave on July 17, 2020, related to the New York civil investigation of Donald Trump and his company. Under the terms of this deal, he was sentenced on April 10 to five months in prison. The plea deal describes these two counts:

- Weisselberg was present on September 21, 2015, when Trump told a Forbes reporter that his triplex was 33,000 square feet. In his deposition, he denied he had ever been "present when Mr. Trump described the size of the triplex."
- Weisselberg knew "the triplex was 10,996 square feet — not 30,000 square feet" before the 2016 financial statement was finalized on March 10, 2017. In his deposition, he said, "We didn't find out about the error until the [May 2017] Forbes article came out".

He also admitted that he gave false information in late 2023 at the civil fraud trial. However, he did not plead guilty to those additional charges of perjury (which might have been considered violations of his parole following his 2022 guilty plea for tax fraud), and it was agreed he would not be sentenced for them.

== Perjury conviction ==
On March 4, 2024, Weisselberg pled guilty in a Manhattan New York state court to two counts of perjury related to lying under oath during the civil fraud trial. On April 10, 2024, he was sentenced to five months in prison. He went to Rikers Island immediately and was released on July 19, 2024.

== Personal life ==
In 1978, Weisselberg purchased a modest ranch-style house in Wantagh, New York, a suburban hamlet in Long Island's Nassau County. This would remain his primary residence until 2013, when he and his wife, Hilary, sold the property for $468,000 and "moved into a high floor" of a luxury apartment building in the Trump Organization's Riverside South development on the Upper West Side of Manhattan. In 2002, the couple bought a vacation home in Boynton Beach, Florida. Former daughter-in-law Jennifer Weisselberg has asserted that Donald Trump disparaged the Wantagh residence at a 2004 family shiva. She added: "He has more feelings and adoration for Donald than for his wife... For Donald, it's a business. But for Allen, it's a love affair.”

His son Jack Weisselberg is a loan-origination executive at Ladder Capital, which has acted as a lender to the Trump Organization. Another son, Barry Weisselberg, has managed the Trump Organization's Central Park ice rinks.

In 2004, Allen Weisselberg appeared as a judge on the seventh episode of the second season of The Apprentice.

== See also ==
- List of Pace University people
- Karen McDougal § Affair with Donald Trump
- Michael Cohen, former attorney for Trump; pleaded guilty to tax evasion and campaign-finance violations, and served a three-year sentence in prison and under house arrest.
- Walt Nauta, butler and body man to former US president Donald Trump; indicted by a federal grand jury and charged with eight counts of federal crimes.
