= Criminal trial of Donald Trump in New York =

The criminal trial in The People of the State of New York v. Donald J. Trump was held from April 15 to May 30, 2024. Donald Trump, the 45th, and later 47th president of the United States was charged with 34 felony counts of falsifying business records to conceal payments made to the pornographic film actress Stormy Daniels as hush money to buy her silence over a sexual encounter between them; with costs related to the transaction included, the payments totaled $420,000. The Manhattan District Attorney (DA), Alvin Bragg, accused Trump of falsifying these business records with the intent to commit other crimes.

The prosecution argued that Trump's 2016 campaign sought to benefit from the payment of hush money to Daniels through Trump's former lawyer Michael Cohen, who was reimbursed via a false retainer agreement. The prosecution rested on May 20, 2024, after calling 20 witnesses. The defense argued that Trump was unaware of any allegedly unlawful scheme, that Cohen was unreliable as a witness, and that the retainer agreement between them was valid. The defense rested on May 21 after calling two witnesses. Throughout proceedings, the defense also made unsuccessful requests for the case to be delayed or dismissed, for the judge to recuse himself, and for removal to federal court.

Trump was convicted on all counts on May 30, 2024, becoming the first U.S. president to be convicted of a felony. Following his victory in the 2024 United States presidential election, his sentencing was temporarily suspended. Trump was sentenced to an unconditional discharge on January 10, 2025.

== Background ==
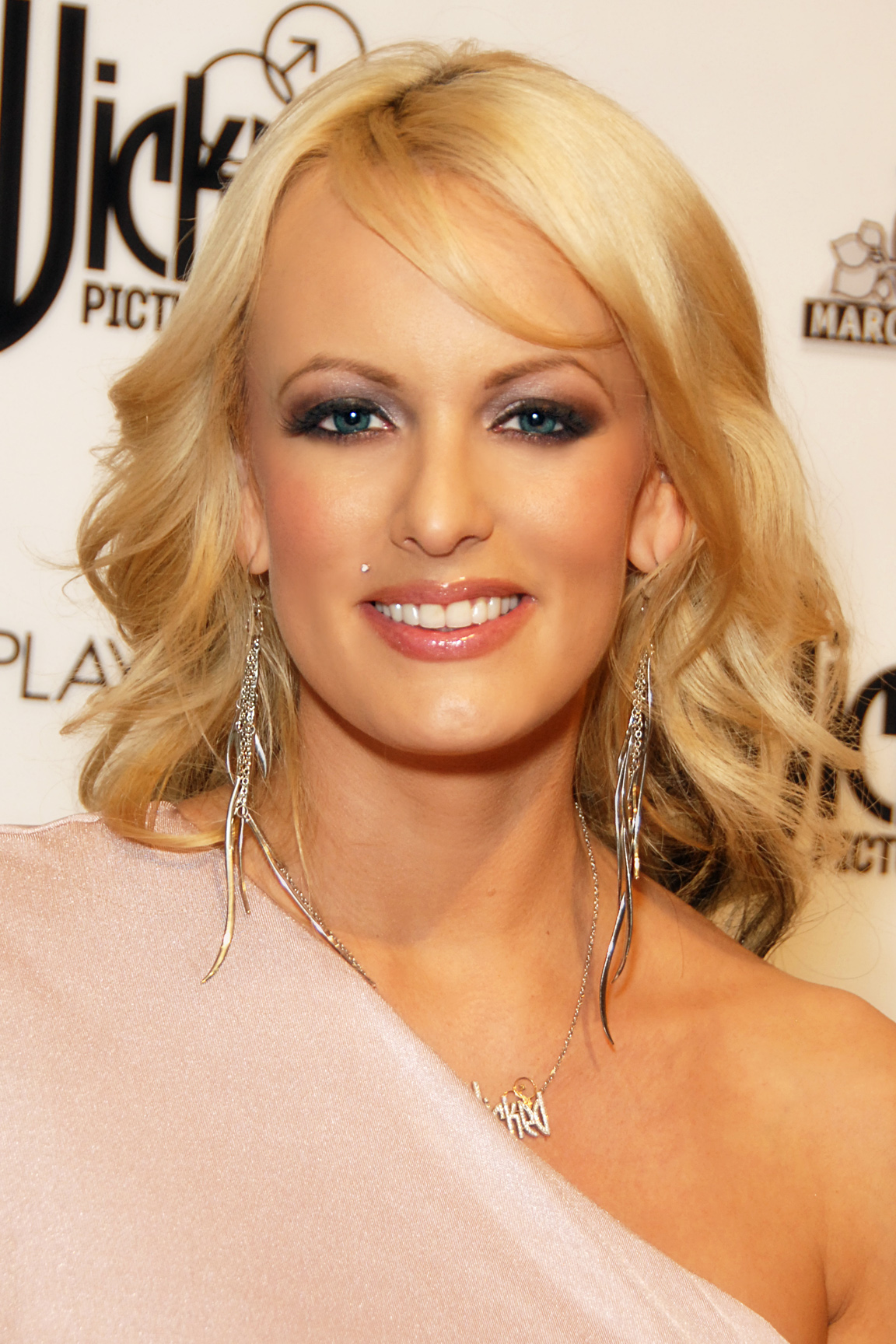
Donald Trump was indicted for his role in instructing Michael Cohen to pay US$130,000 to Stormy Daniels, pictured in 2010.

=== Stormy Daniels hush money payment ===
In July 2006, Stephanie Clifford, a pornographic film actress known professionally as "Stormy Daniels", met Donald Trump at a celebrity golf tournament in Nevada. At the time, Trump was the host of the reality TV series The Apprentice and was married to Melania Trump. According to Daniels, Trump invited her to his penthouse at Harrah's Lake Tahoe where the two had sex and talked about making her a guest on The Apprentice.

As Trump's 2016 presidential campaign began, Daniels' agent Gina Rodriguez approached multiple publications, including the National Enquirer, and attempted to sell the story. Following the publication of a controversial recording of Trump and Access Hollywood host Billy Bush, the National Enquirer sought to suppress the story. Rather than paying Daniels, the National Enquirer editor-in-chief Dylan Howard negotiated a $130,000 non-disclosure agreement between Daniels and Michael Cohen.

Ultimately, Cohen drew the money from his home equity line of credit and sent it through a shell company incorporated in Delaware. Trump wrote several checks totaling $420,000 to Cohen. The checks reimbursed him for the non-disclosure agreement and covered the costs for Cohen to manipulate online polls to boost Trump's status. These payments were made throughout 2017, during Trump's first year of presidency. The payments made to Cohen were declared as a legal expense. Cohen pleaded guilty to eight criminal counts relating to the payment—as well as another payment made to Karen McDougal—in August. In his admission of guilt, Cohen stated that he acted "at the direction of a candidate for federal office", implicating Trump. In December 2018, Cohen was sentenced to three years in prison.

=== Investigation and indictment ===
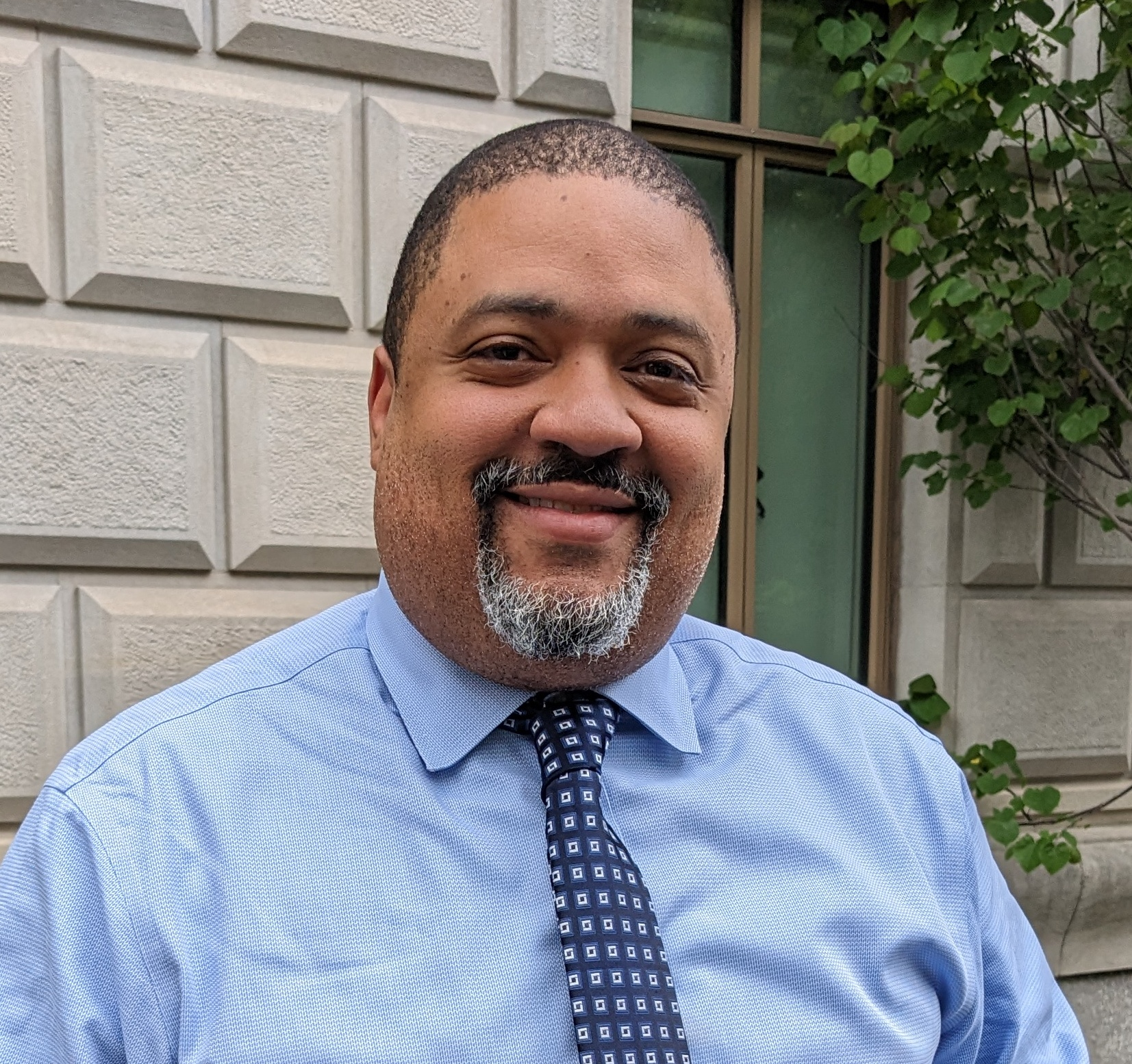
Alvin Bragg, who succeeded Vance as Manhattan District Attorney at the beginning of 2022, continued the investigation and secured an indictment and trial of Trump.

Following Cohen's August 2018 admission of guilt, Manhattan District Attorney (DA) Cyrus Vance Jr. opened an investigation against the Trump Organization and two of its executives. Following the 2021 New York County District Attorney election, Alvin Bragg succeeded Vance as the Manhattan DA. In January 2023, the Manhattan DA's office impaneled a grand jury, and began presenting evidence of Trump's role in the Stormy Daniels payment. In March 2023, Bragg's office indicated that an indictment was likely.

The April 4, 2023, indictment document

The Manhattan grand jury voted to indict Trump on March 30, 2023. The indictment was filed with the New York Supreme Court (the ordinary trial court for felonies in the state of New York and not the final court of appeal for the state) the same day.

The indictment charged Trump with 34 felony counts of falsifying business records in the first degree, in violation of New York Penal Law §175.10. Each count is related to a specific business document, each having a date ranging from February 14 through December 5, 2017. The allegedly falsified documents are related to Trump's payment to Stormy Daniels as hush money. The payments were listed in the business records as a legal expense payable to Michael Cohen, whereas the indictment alleges that they were actually to reimburse Cohen for the earlier, allegedly illicit, payment to Daniels. Falsifying business records in the first degree is a felony under New York state law that requires that the "intent to defraud includes an intent to commit another crime or to aid or conceal the commission thereof".

Trump was arraigned on April 4, 2023.

=== Pre-trial proceedings ===
As he had done in other cases, Trump used "attack-and-delay" tactics, targeting the prosecutors and the judge while prolonging proceedings, with the aim that the case might continue into late 2024, near the presidential election.

Justice Juan Merchan, who has experience with financial cases, was randomly assigned to oversee the grand jury proceedings in Trump's case, and continued to oversee handling of the charges approved by the grand jury. On May 31, 2023, Trump's lawyers filed a motion asking Judge Merchan to recuse himself from the case citing his daughter's position as partner and COO of Authentic Campaigns, a consulting firm that serviced Biden's 2020 presidential campaign. The court denied the motion on August 11, 2023.

On May 4, 2023, Trump's lawyers asked for the case to be moved to a federal court (though it would remain a state-law prosecution conducted by the Manhattan DA), arguing that it involved alleged conduct somehow "performed while in office"—despite the potential federal election-law violations not being specified and occurring prior to Trump's inauguration. On July 19, arguing that the matter was apparently a personal "cover-up of an embarrassing event", District Judge Alvin Hellerstein ruled that the case should remain in state court. Trump appealed the decision on July 28, but withdrew this on November 14.

On May 23, 2023, Justice Merchan set the trial for March 25, 2024. In March 2024, the U.S. Attorney's Office provided prosecutors with approximately 170,000 pages of documents, largely related to the 2017 federal probe of Cohen's payment to Daniels (and mostly reflecting evidence already turned over to Trump's lawyers in June 2023). Trump's lawyers sought a delay in the trial on the basis of the newly produced records; the DA's office said in court that only 300 of the documents were relevant to Trump's defense. On March 15, 2024, the judge delayed the start of trial until mid-April. On March 25, 2024, the judge set a trial date of April 15, and denied a motion by Trump's team to further delay the trial.

On March 26, 2024, Merchan imposed a gag order on Trump, restricting what he could say publicly about people involved in the case. On March 26, Trump made online posts attacking the judge, the gag order, and Merchan's daughter, the latter over an anti-Trump social-media post created by someone impersonating her on social media. The same day, Merchan imposed a gag order forbidding Trump to publicly comment on court staff, prosecutors, prospective jurors, or their families, or prospective trial witnesses; or to cause others to make such statements, in a way that interferes with the case. Bragg (as a public figure) and Merchan (as the judge) were specifically exempted from protection. On March 27 and 28, Trump again attacked Merchan's daughter on social media. On April 1, Merchan expanded the gag order to protect his and Bragg's family members, saying attacks on them "serve no legitimate purpose". Contempt hearings were later held concerning numerous alleged violations of the gag order. On May 14, a New York appeals court denied Trump's request to overturn the order.

== Trial overview ==
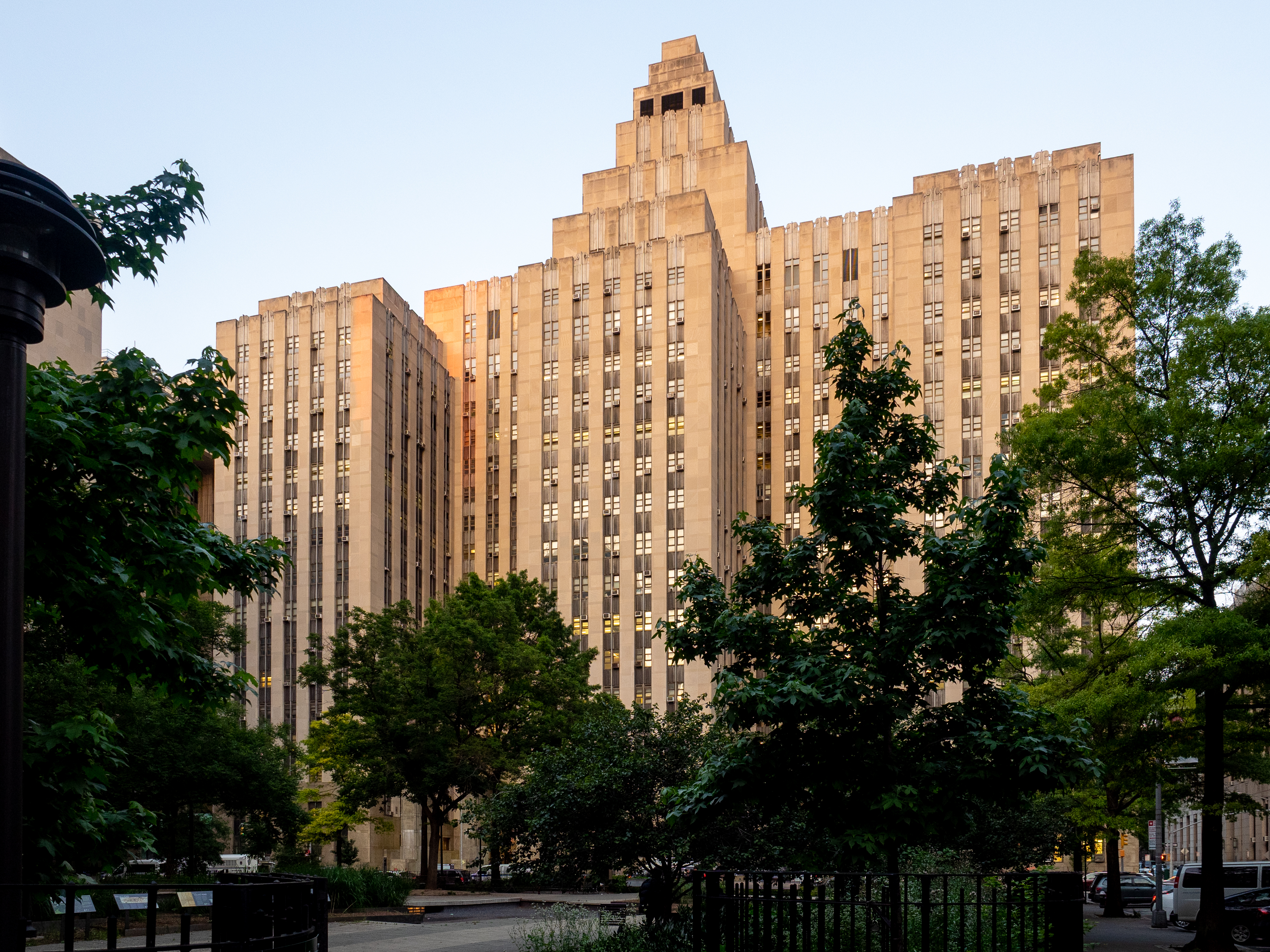
Court proceedings, including the trial, were held in the Manhattan Criminal Courthouse in the Civic Center neighborhood.

The trial began on April 15, 2024, with recessed Wednesdays. Trump was required to attend every day of trial barring a court-approved absence. If he chose to testify, prosecutors could have asked him about his civil lawsuits regarding business fraud, sexual abuse, and defamation as well as the 2018 dissolution of his charitable foundation. Attorneys Todd Blanche and Susan Necheles represented him.

The trial was not televised. Initially, Merchan allowed photographers to stand at the front of the room for a few minutes each morning before the trial began to take photos of Trump seated. Merchan withdrew this permission on May 9 after at least one photo was taken from the side of the table. There are courtroom sketch artists present to capture the milieu. (Note: There were three courtroom sketch artists, hired by various news agencies, who attended the trial daily: Christine Cornell, Elizabeth Williams, and Jane Rosenberg. The sketch artists, positioned in the third row of the gallery (the first two rows were reserved by the defense and prosecution), often struggled to gain a clear view of the witnesses due to their distance and obstructions caused by security personnel, instead often relying on binoculars to observe the proceedings through an internal video feed. Due to the security restrictions, the sketch artists delivered their work during breaks, by propping up their sketches on a trash can in the court bathroom and then using cell phones to photograph them. The sketches have been criticized by the public for their lack of detail, likeness, and negative depictions. Trump has criticized the sketches as being unflattering.)

The temperature in the trial courtroom was a point of contention, with Trump repeatedly complaining that it was too cold, akin to an icebox, possibly intentionally. Judge Juan Merchan acknowledged that the courtroom was chilly, but has stated that he would rather it be a little cold than too hot, and that climate control is limited in the 80-year-old building. Despite Trump's complaints, reporters in the courtroom noted that the temperature was not as cold as he claims.

=== List of witnesses ===
Prosecution witnesses in the prosecution of Donald Trump in New York
Witness	Date	Function
David Pecker	April 22	Publisher of National Enquirer
David Pecker	April 23	Publisher of National Enquirer
David Pecker	April 25	Publisher of National Enquirer
David Pecker	April 26	Publisher of National Enquirer
Rhona Graff	April 26	Donald Trump executive assistant
Rhona Graff	April 30	Donald Trump executive assistant
Gary Farro	April 30	First Republic banker
Robert Browning	April 30	C-SPAN Executive Director for Archives
Phillip Thompson	April 30	Regional Director of Esquire Deposition Solutions
Keith Davidson	April 30	Former attorney for Stormy Daniels
Keith Davidson	May 2	Former attorney for Stormy Daniels
Douglas Daus	May 2	Computer forensics specialist in the Manhattan DA's office
Hope Hicks	May 3	Former White House Communications Director
Jeffrey McConney	May 6	Former Trump Organization comptroller
Deborah Tarasoff	May 6	Trump Organization accounting employee
Sally Franklin	May 7	Penguin Books executive
Stormy Daniels	May 7	Hush money recipient
Stormy Daniels	May 9	Hush money recipient
Rebecca Manochio	May 9	Trump Organization bookkeeper
Tracey Menzies	May 9	Senior vice president at HarperCollins
Madeleine Westerhout	May 9	Former director of Oval Office Operations
Madeleine Westerhout	May 10	Former director of Oval Office Operations
Jennie Tomalin	May 10	Verizon senior analyst
Daniel Dixon	May 10	AT&T compliance analyst
Jaden Jarmel-Schneider	May 10	Paralegal in the Manhattan DA's office
Georgia Longstreet	May 10	Paralegal in the Manhattan DA's office
Michael Cohen	May 13	Hush money intermediary
Michael Cohen	May 14	Hush money intermediary
Michael Cohen	May 16	Hush money intermediary
Michael Cohen	May 20	Hush money intermediary

Defense witnesses in the prosecution of Donald Trump in New York
Date	Witness	Function
Daniel Sitko	May 20	Paralegal for defense attorney
Robert Costello	May 20	Associate of Michael Cohen
Robert Costello	May 21	Associate of Michael Cohen

== Jury selection and opening statements ==
On April 8, 2024, the judge gave attorneys a copy of the jury selection questionnaire, with jury selection beginning on April 15 from a pool of over 500 candidates.

Over the first two days, 96 potential jurors appeared, of which more than half were immediately dismissed after indicating that they could not be impartial. Nine jurors provisionally qualified on the first day, and an additional ten on the second; from these 19, seven jurors were selected and sworn in. (Note: On April 17, 2024, Trump incorrectly complained that he had not received sufficient peremptory strikes, posting on Truth Social, "I thought STRIKES were supposed to be 'unlimited' when we were picking our jury? I was then told we only had 10, not nearly enough when we were purposely given the 2nd Worst Venue in the Country. Don't worry, we have the First Worst also, as the Witch Hunt continues! ELECTION INTERFERENCE!". The number of permitted peremptory challenges are determined by the class of the felony charge under state law. Trump was charged with a Class E felony, a lower-level felony, which under New York state law entitles the prosecutors and defense to ten peremptory strikes each. Under New York law, each side does have an unlimited number of strikes for cause, but these must be approved by the presiding judge.)

However, two were excused on April 18, one of whom complaining that her friends and family had recognized her from details published in the news. Trump was reprimanded by the judge on April 16 for gesturing and audibly speaking in the direction of a potential juror.

Another group of 96 potential jurors was brought in later in the week. Twelve jurors, along with one alternate, were selected by April 18. The selection of six alternate jurors concluded on April 19. The jury reportedly comprised seven men and five women, who mostly had white-collar careers. The jurors were allowed to tell their family and employers that they were on the jury but could not discuss the case with them.

Trump was described as falling asleep for brief intervals on four out of the first five days of the trial, ahead of opening statements, and as being flatulent. (Note: It was described by Ben Meiselas and George Conway that Trump seemed to have an odoriferous flatulence, sometimes while appearing to doze off, during proceedings. The claims were subsequently reiterated by the media.) Trump has denied dozing off at his trial. (Note: Trump's campaign repeatedly denied Trump's naps, stating that "None of these sources know what the hell they're talking about and clearly have no access to any type of factual information". On May 2, Trump denied sleeping, posting on Truth Social, "I simply close my beautiful blue eyes, sometimes, listen intensely, and take it ALL in!!! On May 9, in an interview with Telemundo Miami, Trump stated "No, I don't fall asleep. I sometimes will sit back, close my eyes. I hear everything perfectly. At some point I may fall asleep. But I will let you know when that is." Sleeping in court is unusual for a criminal defendant and would be viewed as disdainful by a jury.)

On April 22, opening statements began. Prosecutors accused Trump, Cohen, and Pecker of campaign finance violations, alleging they coordinated payments to two women and concealed them as part of a conspiracy to influence the 2016 election. During their opening statements, prosecutors said the jury would be presented with a document with a handwritten note in the margin by Allen Weisselberg outlining the hush-money payment scheme.

The defense argued that the testimony of Cohen, a convicted felon, could not be trusted; that the payments were ordinary business transactions, akin to editorial decisions made by newspapers; and that in democracies it is normal for candidates to attempt to influence an election.

== Contempt hearings ==
On April 15, prosecutors asked the judge to hold Trump in contempt and fine him $3,000 for three alleged violations of the gag order against him; prosecutors also requested to use the attacks on Cohen as evidence. By the morning of April 18, prosecutors alleged that Trump incurred seven further violations of the order and requested that he be fined another $7,000.

On April 23, Merchan heard arguments about whether Trump had violated the earlier gag order when he made social-media posts about two expected witnesses. Merchan criticized Trump's attorney Todd Blanche for failing to justify Trump's claim that he was merely responding to "political attacks" and for failing to provide any legal precedent supporting Trump's claim that reposting an article could not be a violation of a gag order; Merchan told Blanche, "You're losing credibility." Merchan rejected Trump's position that reposting a news article to social media was a merely "passive" rather than active act. (Note: The judge stated that "Passive conduct would be if someone makes a post and it somehow ends up in the client's account without anybody doing anything.") The defense also declared that "Trump absolutely knows what the gag order allows him to do and does not allow him to do."

On April 30, Trump became the first U.S. president ever to be held in criminal contempt of court, under NY Judiciary Law Section 750(3). (Trump had previously been held in civil contempt, for withholding documents, in the New York business fraud case.) Trump was found in contempt on nine of the ten counts, regarding statements made from April 10–17. Over the next few days, he paid a $9,000 fine. Merchan said he would consider jailing Trump for further violations "if necessary and appropriate".

On May 2, a second hearing was held to consider four further violation claims. (Note: At the May 2, 2024, contempt hearing, Blanche noted that Trump was unable to respond to a quip made by Joe Biden at the White House Correspondents' Association dinner that "Donald has had a few tough days lately. You might call it stormy weather", nor Cohen's tweet that read "Hey [Donald] Von ShitzInPantz...Your attacks on me stink of desperation." Merchan rebuffed that the gag order did not extend to Biden.) The prosecution said it was "not yet seeking jail". On May 6, Trump was found in contempt for one of those four claims (when he on April 22 commented on the jury) and was fined $1,000. (Note: On May 6, 2024, Judge Merchan wrote: "Defendant violated the Order by making public statements about the jury and how it was selected. In doing so, Defendant not only called into question the integrity, and therefore the legitimacy of these proceedings, but again raised the specter of fear for the safety of the jurors and of their loved ones. Such concerns undoubtedly threaten to "interfere with the fair administration of justice and constitutes a direct attack on the Rule of Law." It remains this Court's fundamental responsibility to protect the decency of the criminal process and to control disruptive influences in the courtroom.") The judge again warned Trump of possible incarceration for further violations.

The mayor of New York City, Eric Adams, said that corrections officials would be "ready" if the judge ordered incarceration.

== Prosecution witnesses ==
=== David Pecker ===
Prosecutors called former National Enquirer publisher David Pecker to testify on April 22, 23, 25 and 26 as the trial's first witness, taking most of the first week of testimony. He had been given immunity in 2018 in a federal investigation into Michael Cohen in exchange for information regarding hush money deals. During Pecker's testimony, it was implied that former National Enquirer editor Dylan Howard, who Pecker stated was now living in Australia and suffering from a "spinal condition", would not testify. It was previously reported that while Pecker and his company American Media Inc. (AMI), the National Enquirer's parent company, facilitated payment to McDougal, Pecker refused to personally do the same with Daniels, though he allegedly alerted Trump associates about Daniels' decision to go public with her affair allegation. On April 23, Pecker testified that Cohen used to feed him negative stories about Trump's enemies, which Pecker's staff would then "embellish" and show drafts to Cohen to get his feedback before publishing them. Pecker also detailed how he offered to deploy the "catch and kill" scheme, stating that he offered in 2015 to suppress negative stories about Trump and flag efforts by women attempting to sell stories about him. The prosecution cited a state election law regarding conspiracy to defend their questioning of Pecker about his contacts with Steve Bannon, the chief executive officer of Trump's 2016 campaign.

On April 25, Pecker testified that AMI suppressed negative press about other celebrities, which was emphasized by Trump's team in their cross-examination. Additionally, he stated that he did not believe Cohen was working for Trump's campaign. Pecker discussed his relationship with Trump prior to the 2016 campaign, during which he suppressed other negative stories about him. Pecker detailed how his company, Trump and Cohen facilitated payment to McDougal in mid-2016, in tandem with promising her a ghostwritten monthly column in an attempt to disguise the contract's true nature. In September 2016, Cohen asked to purchase the boxes of McDougal's source material (valued by Pecker at $25,000) on Trump's behalf. Pecker then told Cohen that he did not want to be reimbursed for the payment to McDougal. According to Pecker, an AMI staff member leaked details of the scheme on November 4, 2016, ahead of the election, after which Pecker released a false statement that AMI had never paid anyone to kill damaging stories about Trump. AMI then amended its contract with McDougal allowing her to speak to the press. Pecker also described a January 2017 meeting in Trump Tower in which Trump thanked Pecker for his work regarding McDougal and another story. (Note: James Comey, Mike Pompeo, Reince Priebus, and Sean Spicer were also reputedly present.) Pecker said his decision not to facilitate payment to Daniels (because she was a porn star) led to it being done by Cohen. Pecker testified he acted at Trump's behest and intended to help him win the presidency, despite his own doubts regarding campaign-finance laws. Additionally, Pecker said that after receiving a letter from the Federal Election Commission about possible campaign violations in mid-2021, he signed a non-prosecution deal with federal prosecutors for his cooperation.

=== Graff, Farro, Browning, and Thompson ===
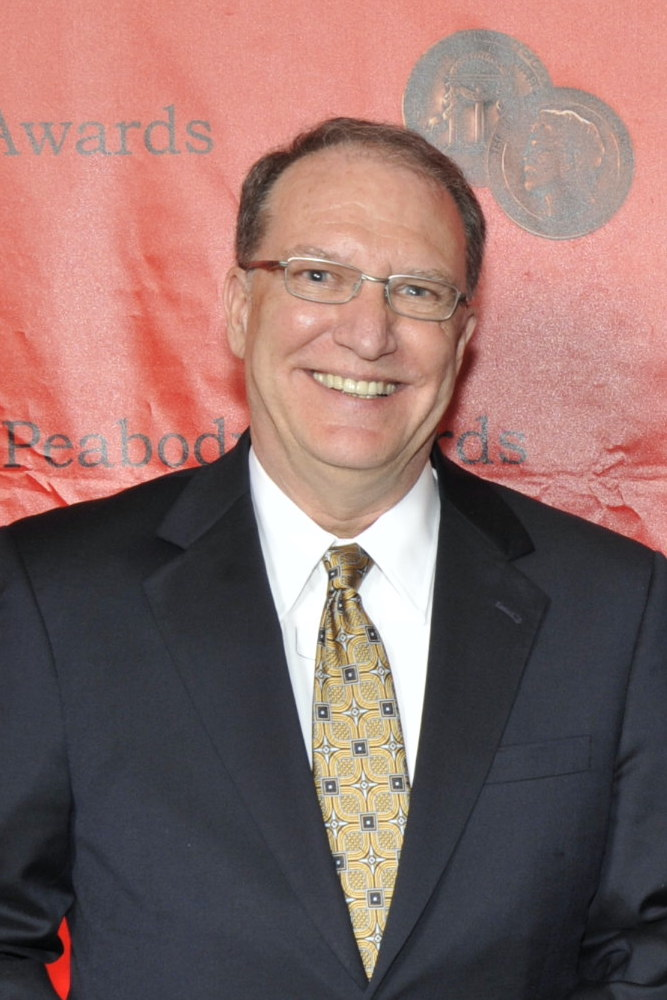
C-SPAN executive Robert Browning, pictured in 2011, was one of several witnesses called to verify the authenticity of evidence.

Four witnesses testified over the latter part of April 26 through the earlier part of April 30.

On April 26, Trump's executive assistant Rhona Graff testified that when she worked outside Trump's office in Trump Tower, she maintained contact information for McDougal and Daniels, and that she had a "vague recollection" of glimpsing Daniels at a Trump Tower reception area. During her cross-examination by the defense, Graff said Trump was sometimes prone to multitasking while signing checks, depending "what was going on ... and how important the checks were".

Additional testimony was also provided by former First Republic banker Gary Farro on April 26 and 30. He testified that on October 26, 2016, he helped Cohen open an account for a real-estate limited liability company. According to prosecutors, the same day, Cohen deposited $131,000 from his personal home-equity credit line, and the next day transferred $130,000 to Daniels' lawyer, Keith Davidson. He detailed how he assisted in setting up the bank account which enabled Cohen to make the hush money payment. Farro stated that Cohen was eager to connect with him, and would set up the account in October 2016. Farro also noted that the account was set up for Essential Consultants LLC, the company the payment was made from, and that it was funded through Cohen's home-equity line of credit at First Republic. According to Farro, Cohen did not want addresses on the checks. Prosecution also presented evidence showing emails to and from Cohen, which confirmed the $131,000 deposit to a checking account 20 minutes after it was opened. In texts between Davidson and Cohen, Davidson provided wiring instructions for the $130,000 hush-money payment. According to Farro, First Republic closed Cohen's accounts after the payment to Daniels became public.

April 30 also saw testimony from C-SPAN Executive Director for Archives Robert Browning, who verified the authenticity of C-SPAN videos of Trump, as well as Phillip Thompson, a regional director of Esquire Deposition Solutions, which provided court reporter services for Trump's October 2022 deposition in one of the E. Jean Carroll defamation cases.

On May 20, the prosecution tried to contact Browning to see if he would be available to testify again, this time regarding a photograph of Trump with his former bodyguard Keith Schiller.

=== Keith Davidson and Douglas Daus ===
Keith Davidson, a former attorney for Stormy Daniels and Karen McDougal, appeared on April 30 and May 2. He testified that the Access Hollywood tape helped influence Daniels to go forward with her story. According to Davidson's testimony, he drafted the $130,000 hush-money agreement, in which he used the pseudonyms "Peggy Peterson" for Daniels and "David Dennison" for Trump. The agreement called for payment by October 14, 2016. When the payment did not arrive, Davidson communicated with Cohen, who told him that Trump was traveling. On October 17, Davidson wrote to Cohen that the agreement was void and furthermore that he would no longer be representing Daniels. (Cohen would wire his personal funds to Davidson on October 27.)

Davidson testified that he believed Trump was behind the hush-money talks. However, he also acknowledged how Cohen wired the transfer and that he also had conversations with Howard as well as Daniels' manager Gina Rodriguez regarding the deal. Howard and Rodriguez, who had no direct roles, would encourage Davidson to connect with Cohen. Daniels, Davidson and Rodriguez were also revealed to have received part of the $130,000 settlement payment. Davidson's role in the $150,000 deal with AMI for McDougal's story was noted as well.

On May 2, the jury heard an audio recording of Cohen and Trump from September 6, 2016, appearing to discuss paying Pecker for McDougal's story, wherein Cohen mentions talking to Weisselberg about setting up the payment and Trump asks, "So, what do we got to pay for this? One-fifty?" Further audio was played of a phone call in which Cohen tells Davidson that "I can't even tell you how many times [Trump] said to me, you know, I hate the fact that we did it," apparently regarding the payment to Daniels. Davidson acknowledged texting Howard on Election Night 2016: "What have we done?", to which Howard responded "Oh my god." Davidson explained that this was a recognition that "our activities may have assisted the presidential campaign" and that it was "sort of gallows humor". He also confirmed that, after texting with Cohen on February 13, 2018, he sent a statement to CNN anchor Chris Cuomo to corroborate Cohen's claim of having paid $130,000 to Daniels from his personal funds. Davidson testified during his cross-examination that he had never personally met Trump.

On May 2, prosecutors called Douglas Daus, a computer forensics specialist in the district attorney's office. Daus testified to examinations of Cohen's cell phones. Several of the prosecutions proposed exhibits were found by Daus.

=== Hope Hicks ===
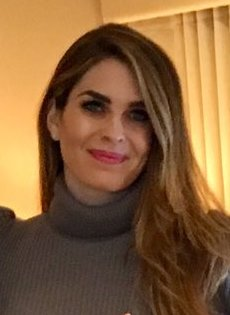
Former White House communications director Hope Hicks, pictured in 2017, testified for one full day.

On May 3, former White House communications director Hope Hicks testified. She said a Wall Street Journal reporter asked her for comment on the alleged Trump–McDougal affair, which is how she learned that AMI had paid to catch and kill the story. She stated that she drafted a statement to respond to The Wall Street Journal, with Cohen offering feedback, but Trump overrode them by telling Hicks to say that McDougal's allegations were "totally untrue", which is how she was quoted by the Journal just days before the election. Hicks also learned at this time that the Journal planned to publish details of Daniels' allegations, with Trump instructing Hicks to deny any affair. Hicks stated that Trump sought to hide news of both scandals from Melania, and after the story of the payment to Daniels broke in early 2018, Trump told her that Cohen had voluntarily decided to pay Daniels to protect him; Hicks opined that this seemed out of character for Cohen. Trump sought Hicks's opinion about how the Daniels story was being perceived, especially in relation to the negative impact it may have had if Cohen had not paid Daniels before the election. Hicks further testified that she had heard Trump praise Pecker on multiple occasions for his negative reporting on his Republican rivals in the 2016 election.

According to Hicks, the Access Hollywood tape roiled the Trump campaign. Though Trump tried to minimize its significance, the campaign felt the tape was a "crisis". Hicks stated that the tape's release stressed Trump because he wanted members of his family, including Melania, to be proud of him and not hurt or embarrassed. In her cross-examination by the defense, Hicks stated that Trump "is a very good multitasker [who] is always doing many things at once".

=== McConney, Tarasoff, and Franklin ===
Three witnesses appeared during May 6 and the earlier part of May 7.

On May 6, former Trump Organization comptroller Jeffrey McConney testified about how Cohen was reimbursed. He testified that Weisselberg instructed him in early 2017 to send the reimbursement payments to Cohen. McConney acknowledged that he told organization payroll specialist (and its accounts payable supervisor) Deborah Tarasoff to record the reimbursement payments as "legal expenses"; he said he told her these payments were part of a retainer agreement between Cohen and Trump. McConney further stated that starting in March 2017, the reimbursement checks for Cohen came from Trump's personal bank account. In 2017, Cohen quit working for Trump after setting up shop at Squire Patton Boggs's offices in Midtown, but nevertheless still identified himself as Trump's personal lawyer. Numerous invoice messages from Cohen and related emails between McConney, Tarasoff and Weisselberg were shown in the courtroom. Several general ledger documents associated with Trump and his trust were reviewed which showed that Trump made the reimbursement payments to Cohen.

Following McConney's testimony, Deborah Tarasoff, a 24-year employee of the Trump Organization who works in accounting, took the stand to testify. She said the organization was paying for her attorney. She described her job duties: "I get approved bills, I enter them into the system, and I cut checks." Tarasoff stated that she had no decision-making authority and merely followed instructions, but also acknowledged that she would approve invoices if she got them, including the ones which were sent to Cohen. Tarasoff testified that while either Trump or one of his two older sons could approve invoices of over $10,000 since 2015, only Trump could access his personal checking account. Twelve reimbursement checks for $35,000 were signed by Trump, and Tarasoff testified that they were mailed to Cohen. Trump, who used a Sharpie pen when writing checks, could write "void" if he disapproved of checks Tarasoff created for the company (e.g. a $70,000 check to Cohen signed by Eric Trump and Wiesselberg in February 2017, which was voided by Trump). She testified that Weisselberg "had his hands in everything". During cross-examination, Tarasoff acknowledged that she not was present for conversations between Trump and Weisselberg about the payments.

On May 7, 2024, Penguin Books executive Sally Franklin testified. Franklin, whose company published a few Trump books, read excerpts from Trump: How to Get Rich and Trump: Think Like a Billionaire, including Trump quotes, "If you don't know every aspect of what you're doing, down to the paper clips, you're setting yourself up for some unwanted surprises," and, "For many years, I've said that if someone screws you, screw them back."

=== Stormy Daniels ===
Stormy Daniels testified for five hours on May 7, and for the earlier part of May 9. She said she met Trump at a celebrity golf tournament near Lake Tahoe, Nevada, in 2006 and detailed a sexual encounter with Trump in his hotel suite after he invited her to dinner. Daniels stated that Trump did not use a condom and that during the encounter, "I was staring up at the ceiling, wondering how I got there," despite not having used drugs or alcohol. (Note: Daniels testified that her sexual partners in her movies always wore a condom.) She said she felt like she blacked out during the encounter and was traumatized by the experience. It was the only time they reputedly had sex. Daniels said Trump offered to make her a contestant on The Apprentice; she stated that he continued alluding to the idea for a time in subsequent phone conversations, in which he referred to her as "honey bunch" and asked when they could meet again. Daniels noted that she met with Trump on multiple occasions, with dozens of witnesses, including a visit to Trump Tower and a final encounter with Trump in Los Angeles in 2007.

In accepting the hush money, Daniels stated that she was not motivated by money (although this appeared to be contradicted by a text message between her and her manager Gina Rodriguez which suggested she was willing to accept the payment). She stated that she had no part in the hush-money negotiations. Daniels also laid out key information about the payment. She maintained her previous allegation that someone threatened her in a Las Vegas parking lot, stating that she did not report it because it would have been upsetting to Trump. Daniels stated that any violation of the hush-money agreement would have cost her a million dollars.

During Daniels' testimony, Merchan sustained many defense objections. He repeatedly admonished Daniels for giving answers that went beyond the scope of the question asked, and at one point interrupting Daniels' testimony, stopping her from describing the sexual position she and Trump used. Merchan criticized the "degree of detail" on matters such as the floor size of the hotel suite. In a sidebar conference, Merchan agreed with defense arguments that Daniels described things which were "better left unsaid" regarding the sexual encounter, but denied the defense's request for a mistrial, noting that the defense would have the opportunity to cross-examine Daniels. Merchan set confines for Daniels' later testimony and directed the prosecution to encourage her to give shorter answers. Afterward, Daniels gave shorter answers and hewed closer to the question asked.

When testimony resumed, Daniels stated that her lawyer Keith Davidson received the $130,000 hush-money payment, and that she got $96,000 of it. She also acknowledged that she signed a statement dated January 10, 2018, in which she denied the affair, but testified that she did not want to sign it and that it was untrue.

In its cross-examination, the defense questioned Daniels about her account of being traumatized by her encounter with Trump, suggesting that her pornographic career would have made the event unsurprising. Daniels explained that the first time she realized the meeting was intended to be sexual was upon coming out of the bathroom inside Trump's hotel, finding him stripped to his boxers; she elaborated that she was "not expecting [this from] a man twice [her] age". Daniels acknowledged that she had contacted renowned high-profile sexual harassment attorney Gloria Allred about potentially suing Trump for the encounter. Much of the cross-examination focused on questioning the accuracy of her allegation that she was threatened in a Las Vegas parking lot, which was revealed to have been disputed by Davidson via texts with Cohen. Despite accepting the hush money, Daniels maintained that her primary goal was to "get the story out".

On May 9, Daniels concluded her testimony after hours of cross-examination. Trump attorney Susan Necheles pressed Daniels on how she profited from her story and brought up minor inconsistencies in how she has told it. Merchan again denied a defense motion for a mistrial, but would provide the jury instructions limiting the use of her testimony. (Note: On May 9, following Daniels testimony, Merchan denied a defense motion for a mistrial noting "for some unexplained reason that I still don't understand there was no objection to certain testimony cited in the motion for a mistrial and again today." Merchan noted the assertion made by the defense that the sexual encounter did not occur during opening arguments entitled the prosecution to make an effort to rehabilitate credibility through detailed questions stating "The more specificity Ms. Daniels can provide about the encounter, the more the jury can weigh whether the encounter did occur and if so whether they choose to credit Ms. Daniels’ story." With regards to more salient topics, Merchan noted that "I wish those questions hadn't been asked, and I wish those answers hadn't been given", but that the defense had ample opportunity to object.) Trump criticized Merchan for permitting the testimony stating "He's [Merchan] trying to make it as salacious as possible by allowing testimony that has nothing to do with the case."

=== Manochio, Menzies, and Westerhout ===
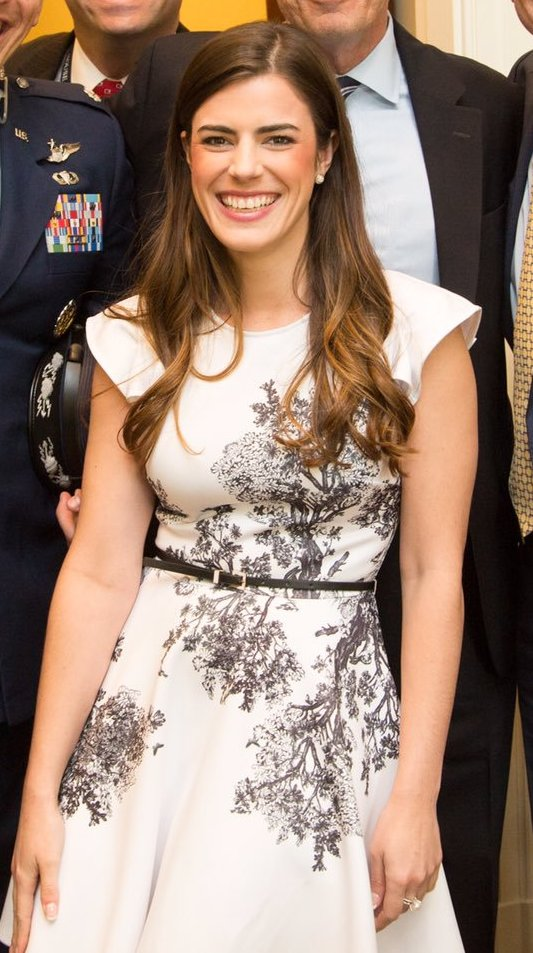
Former director of Oval Office Operations Madeleine Westerhout, pictured in 2019, testified over parts of two days.

On May 9, Rebecca Manochio, a junior bookkeeper at the Trump Organization, testified for about a half-hour. She had provided evidence to the prosecution. Tracy Menzies, a senior vice president at HarperCollins, then testified about the accuracy of certain excerpts from the book Think Big: Make It Happen in Business and Life, which Trump had co-authored.

Trump's director of Oval Office Operations in 2019 and former Secretary to the President between 2017 and 2019, Madeleine Westerhout, also began testifying the same day. She stated that Republican National Committee officials she was working with in 2016 discussed how to replace Trump as the Republican presidential nominee due to concern about the damaging Access Hollywood tape. She also noted how she set up a meeting between Cohen and Trump in February 2017, and how the meeting led to Trump Organization employees sending reimbursement checks to the White House—which Trump would then sign and send to Cohen—through a circuitous mail system. She was in tears when discussing how Trump fired her, reportedly in response to her telling reporters that she had a better relationship with him than his daughters.

Westerhout resumed testifying on May 10. During cross-examination, Westerhout appeared to side with defense arguments that Trump used alternatives to the White House mail system because he wanted to get mail to people more quickly.

=== Dixon, Tomalin, Longstreet, and Jarmel-Schneider ===
For the later part of May 10, four other witnesses testified. Among these witnesses were Jennie Tomalin (a Verizon senior analyst), Daniel Dixon (an AT&T compliance analyst), and Jaden Jarmel-Schneider (a paralegal from the Manhattan DA's office). In successive testimonies, Dixon and Tomalin would authenticate cell phone records which were used as trial evidence. Georgia Longstreet, another paralegal from the Manhattan DA's office, again testified after previously doing so days prior. Longstreet also showed some of Trump's old tweets, as well as texts between Gina Rodriguez and Dylan Howard. Jarmel-Schneider then showed a chart which summarized 34 business records which prosecutors say were falsified.

=== Michael Cohen ===
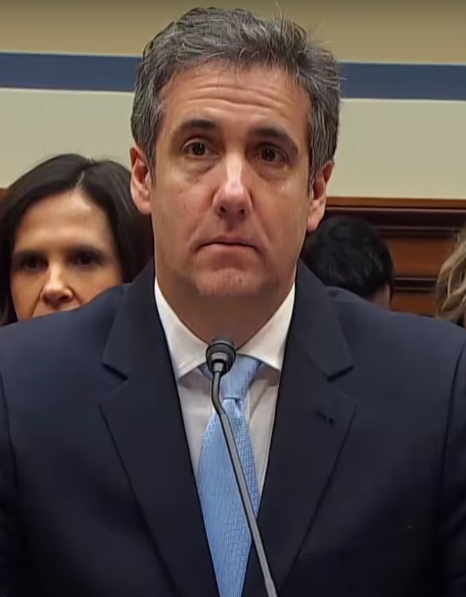
Michael Cohen, pictured in 2019, testified over four days.

On May 13, Michael Cohen, Trump's former "fixer" and attorney (who is considered the case's star witness), began testifying. He would give 17 hours of testimony over four days.

On May 13, Cohen acknowledged that he, Trump and David Pecker conspired to suppress negative stories and promote positive stories about Trump during the 2016 election. He said his work in this matter "was at the direction of and benefit of Mr. Trump", stating that "Everything required Mr. Trump's sign-off." By email (shown as evidence), Cohen informed the National Enquirer that Trump did not want them to report his affair with a "Penthouse Pet". Cohen specified his role in the Enquirer's first catch-and-kill story for Trump, about a Trump Tower doorman who alleged that Trump had fathered a child out of wedlock. Cohen detailed his role in the hush-money payment to McDougal, stating that he monitored progress by text, phone and the Signal app. He repeated that he communicated by "phone, email and text" with McDougal, Daniels and Keith Davidson. By text message, Cohen told Dylan Howard that he was making the payments on Trump's behalf. He further noted that after Pecker refused to pay for the Daniels story, he took over as funder of "catch-and-kill operations".

Cohen acknowledged Hicks's testimony about the conversation over the McDougal payment press coverage. According to Cohen, he and everybody at the organization had contact with Weisselberg. He further accused Weisselberg of providing him with the financial advice concerning the payment to McDougal, stating that it foreshadowed the way he arranged for the Daniels payment. Cohen said he first spoke to Trump about the Daniels allegation in 2011 after it was leaked to The Dirty, and that Trump called her "a beautiful woman" (having said the same about McDougal) and said they had met in 2006 at a golf outing and that she had liked him more than football star "Big Ben". Cohen said Trump did not respond when he asked if he had had sex with her and that Trump took him up on his offer to get the story taken down.

Cohen said the release of the Access Hollywood tape was viewed as a campaign liability and that Trump afterwards directed him to pay Daniels to avoid "catastrophic" damage. Cohen said that he viewed supermarket tabloids like the National Enquirer to be influential in reaching voters and that Trump was concerned about the effect Daniels' story could have had on female voters. Cohen stated that Trump told him: "Just pay it. There's no reason to keep this thing out there. Just do it." Cohen testified that Weisselberg told him to not make the payment through the Trump Organization and instead to come up with a more creative way to do it. Cohen said that he and Weisselberg discussed processing the $130,000 through one of Trump's golf courses as if it were a membership or event fee but they decided against it. When Weisselberg said he lacked the personal finances, Cohen agreed to pay it. Cohen said he suggested the idea of including a clause in the nondisclosure agreement penalizing Daniels $1,000,000 every time she told her story. After Trump's 2016 election victory, Weisselberg and Cohen discussed the reimbursement plan in Trump's 26th-floor office, and Weisselberg coordinated the repayments to Cohen. A bank statement for Essential Consultants LLC from the end of October 2016 was presented, which showed the $130,000 sent to Keith Davidson and featured a note Cohen said was handwritten by Weisselberg. It showed the doubling of the $180,000 reimbursement—$130,000 for Daniels plus $50,000 for money Trump owed Cohen for paying tech company Red Finch (to poll for the Trump campaign and promote Cohen on Twitter as something of a sex symbol)—so that Cohen would receive the full amount after paying 50% in taxes, plus a $60,000 year-end bonus, totaling $420,000. Cohen said it occurred to him that Weisselberg and Trump had planned this reimbursement scheme in advance and that Weisselberg had said in Trump's presence that the monthly payments would function in the guise of a retainer agreement.

Cohen testified that he aspired to be a personal lawyer to the president but that Trump, instead of granting him this role, significantly cut his 2016 bonus. Cohen said his relationship with Trump was falling apart at this time. He said his work for Trump boosted his personal career, including by securing more prominent clients.

On May 14, Cohen said he sent the Trump Organization false invoices requesting money for "services rendered". He said that, in February 2017, he confronted Trump in the Oval Office over his lack of repayment. He said he lied about Daniels to protect Trump (while also "staying on Trump's message" by lying about the Trump Tower Moscow project). Cohen testified that, in January 2018, he pressured Davidson to have Daniels sign a false statement denying the affair and payment, which Daniels signed on January 30, and also offered her an appearance on Fox News with Sean Hannity. Cohen testified that Daniels also wanted an appearance on Fox News' Hannity, which she did not go through with. Cohen also testified that he decided to stop lying for Trump following a meeting he had with his family shortly before his 2018 guilty plea. Before the day concluded, Cohen began defense cross-examination. On May 16, a Trump lawyer accused Cohen of lying that on October 26, 2016, he was on the phone with Trump's personal bodyguard, Keith Schiller, and had him hand the phone to Trump, who then approved the hush-money deal. The defense cited phone records as showing that a series of prank calls to Cohen had prompted him to contact Schiller for a call lasting one minute and 36 seconds, which Cohen defended as enough time to handle both matters.

On May 20, during cross-examination, Cohen confirmed that around October 26, 2016, he helped Tiffany Trump regarding an extortion issue she faced. He said he was also working with David Pecker that month. Cohen made two brief calls to Donald Trump on the morning of October 26, which he said were about Daniels. On January 27, 2017, Cohen told the Trump Organization he would no longer be working at Trump Tower because he was now Trump's "personal attorney". On January 31, 2017, Weisselberg emailed Cohen with the subject: "Note and mortgage modification agreement for Trump Park Avenue Condominium." Weisselberg asked Cohen to "prepare the agreement discussed" so Weisselberg could start sending monthly payments. Cohen said that Donald Jr. and Eric Trump signed the checks "because they were the trustees". In 2017, he received nine checks for $35,000 apiece directly from Trump, plus two checks from the trust. Cohen confirmed that he lied to Weisselberg about how much he had paid Red Finch, and that his false reimbursement request amounted to theft from the organization. He said he lied in 2018 when he said that Trump had been unaware of the Daniels payment. He said he had no income between his 2018 guilty plea and the publication of his 2020 memoir, but that since then he had earned $4.4 million from podcasts and books. Asked whether he has a "financial interest in the outcome of this case", Cohen said he expected to make more money if Trump was found not guilty, since "it gives me more to talk about". He acknowledged that his name recognition comes from his frequent criticism of Trump and that he was even interested in running for Congress.

Defense cross-examination of Cohen concluded on May 20. Cohen testified that the retainer agreement Weisselberg proposed he maintain with Trump to conceal the monthly reimbursements was fraudulent in nature.

The defense pointed to occasions when Cohen did legal work, and said this was evidence that he was retained as a lawyer under a valid retainer agreement, as Cohen would not do legal work for free, nor would Trump pay in excess of reimbursements. Additionally, the defense pointed out that CFO Weisselberg requested from Cohen an agreement without suggesting it would be a fake agreement: "please prepare the agreement we discussed so we can pay you monthly."

The prosecution then conducted redirect examination. The prosecution rested its case the same day.

== Defense witnesses ==
The defense began its case on May 20, 2024, and rested its case on May 21 after calling two witnesses. Trump did not testify. (Note: On April 12, 2024, Trump stated that he would "absolutely" testify. On April 26, Trump stated he would testify "if it's necessary." On May 2, Trump falsely claimed that the gag order prevented him from testifying. Merchan clarified the next morning that Trump had a constitutional right to testify, later asking Blanche on May 14 and May 16 whether Trump would do so. On May 20, during a lunch recess, Blanche stated "there is a likelihood that we will rest today" indicating that Trump would likely not testify. On May 21, at a press conference following closing arguments, Trump declined to discuss his decision not to testify. In criminal trials, intentionally delaying the revelation of a defendant's decision to testify until the latest possible juncture is a common strategic legal maneuver as maintaining such tactical ambiguity may influence the direction of the trial. Criminal defendants often do not testify in their own defense due to the increased legal risks.) On May 22, he stated (in a press interview outside the court proceedings) that he did not testify because (1) he disagreed with Merchan's past rulings, (2) he was concerned about being questioned about his own past, and (3) there was "no case". (Note: Trump has previously declined to testify in matters that could pose legal or political risks. In criminal trials, defendants are not obligated to testify, juries are instructed not to draw any inferences from a defendant's decision not to testify, and prosecutors cannot comment on a defendant's decision not to testify.)

The defense team had initially planned to call Bradley Smith, a former chairman of the Federal Election Commission (FEC), as an expert witness on campaign finance law. Smith had argued that the payments to Daniels were not campaign payments and not illegal. However, on May 20, Judge Merchan ruled that Smith's testimony would be limited to "general definitions and terms" so as to not supplant the judge's role to determine what the law is. Smith was prohibited from mentioning "there had never been a case in which anyone had been convicted of a federal campaign finance law violation for the making of 'hush money payments'" and from discussing "that the FEC dismissed the complaint against defendant and the DOJ decided against prosecuting defendant for potential FECA violations" due to irrelevance. In February 2024, prosecutors pointed out that Smith had previously been barred from testifying for the defense in two unrelated federal cases in Manhattan where the defense had improperly sought to have Smith interpret campaign finance law for the jury: United States v. Bankman-Fried and United States v. Suarez. As a result, the defense decided not to call Smith as a witness. Trump then falsely stated that Merchan had not allowed Smith to be called, and Smith wrote that the "judge's bias is very evident."

=== Daniel Sitko ===
On May 20, Daniel Sitko, a paralegal for Todd Blanche, provided testimony. A chart of phone calls between Cohen and Robert Costello, the lawyer that Giuliani suggested Cohen hire in 2018, was submitted into evidence.

=== Robert Costello ===
On May 20, Robert Costello also testified. Merchan admonished the witness for making comments on the stand objecting to rulings, staring at the judge, and rolling his eyes.

On May 21, Costello was cross-examined by the prosecution. Emails from Costello to his law partner Jeff Citron and Cohen were shown. In a May 2018 email to Citron, Costello said it was a goal to get Cohen "on the right page without giving him the appearance that we are following instructions from Giuliani or the president" and said he believed it was "the clear and correct strategy". When asked if "the email speaks for itself" as he had asserted the day before, Costello said "Sometimes." He also wrote to Citron about Cohen, "What should I say to this asshole? He is playing with the most powerful man on the planet." (Cohen testified that Costello and Trump's campaign had attempted to pressure him to realign to their interests.) In an email to Cohen, Costello wrote: "You are making a very big mistake if you believe the stories these 'journalists' are writing about you. They want you to cave. They want you to fail. They do not want you to persevere and succeed. If you really believe you are not being supported properly by your former boss, then you should make your opinion known." The defense rested its case thereafter.

== Closing arguments and jury instructions ==
Later on May 21, arguments over jury instruction language were held. Merchan announced that the jury would be excused until the beginning of summations on May 28. Merchan stated that the closing arguments "will not be quick" and that he expected his final instructions to the jury to last an hour. On Memorial Day, May 27, Trump complained that the prosecution would get the last word as "very unfair", though this is standard procedure in criminal trials where the state has the burden of proof. (Note: On Memorial Day, May 28, 2024, Trump questioned the order of closing arguments via Truth Social writing, "Why Is The Corrupt Government Allowed To Make The Final Argument In The Case Against Me? Why Can't The Defense Go Last? Big Advantage, Very Unfair. Witch Hunt!". Following the closing arguments, Trump again complained writing "CAN YOU IMAGINE THAT I, AS A DEFENDANT, AM NOT ALLOWED TO REBUT OR CORRECT THE MANY LIES TOLD DURUNG THE 5 HOUR FILIBUSTER JUST PUT ON BY THE SOROS BACKED D.A.'s OFFICE IN THE MANHATTAN COURT." In criminal trials, the order of presentation for closing arguments is reversed from that of opening statements, allowing the defense to present their closing summations first, followed by the prosecution. The prosecution typically get an opportunity to deliver a rebuttal during closings because burden of proof lies with them, not the defense.)

On May 28, the defense gave a three-hour closing argument including breaks. Trump lawyer Todd Blanche claimed Trump had nothing to do with checks which were written by Trump's sons, Donald Trump Jr. and Eric Trump. Blanche questioned why prosecutors did not call Donald Jr. and Eric as witnesses despite their signing payment checks to Cohen. Blanche also showed an email revealing that McConnery sought approval from both Donald Jr. and Eric. Blanche alleged that it was Cohen's decision to make the hush-money payment and variously branded him a prolific liar. Blanche sought to discredit Daniels' ambitions, noting (among other things) text messages between her manager and publicist Gina Rodriguez and Dylan Howard which showed that Howard believed Pecker would pay for her story shortly after the Access Hollywood tape was released. Merchan admonished Blanche for telling the jury: "You cannot send someone to prison, you cannot convict somebody, based upon the words of Michael Cohen." Merchan said this type of comment is "highly inappropriate" and "not allowed", as the jury is instructed not to consider how Merchan might sentence Trump.

The same day, the prosecution gave a four-hour and 41 minute closing argument including breaks. Prosecutor Joshua Steinglass described Pecker's testimony as "utterly damning". Steinglass noted that some key parts of Daniels' story were proven true and noted that the defense appeared to acknowledge that Trump knew about the Daniels payment as early as 2017. Steinglass stated that it made sense that Cohen was interested in the outcome of the case, noting that Trump dropped him "like a hot potato" when their relationship soured. Steinglass argued that Cohen was Trump's "fixer" and that his knowledge was "limited to what actually happened". It was noted that Cohen did not work for the Trump Organization's legal department and answered directly to Trump. A footnote from the 2018 Office of Government Ethics form was shown, which stated that "In 2016 expenses were incurred by one of Donald J. Trump's attorneys, Michael Cohen. Mr. Cohen sought reimbursement of those expenses and Mr. Trump fully reimbursed Mr. Cohen in 2017."

Steinglass went over phone conversations between Trump and Cohen regarding the hush-money payment and showed a December 2017 check to Cohen signed via Sharpie by Donald Trump, arguing that the latter must have known the purpose of such checks, as his "entire business philosophy was and is to be involved in everything". Steinglass cited a 2018 tweet by Trump in which he acknowledged that Cohen was reimbursed for an NDA via a retainer agreement, but said it had "nothing to do with the campaign". Steinglass said the defense's characterization of the payments to Cohen was undermined by his lack of pay from Trump in 2018 despite Cohen doing legal work for him that year. Steinglass further stated that the payment was made to "hoodwink the American voter". At the end of closing arguments, Merchan said that jury instructions would be read on May 29 and were expected to last an hour. Trump described the closing arguments as "BORING!" on Truth Social.

== Jury deliberations and verdict ==
On May 29, the jury began deliberations. A few hours in, they asked to hear a readback of about 30 minutes of testimony by Pecker and Cohen; the readback was held the following day. It regarded an August 2015 meeting between Pecker, Cohen, Trump, and Hicks, in which Pecker pledged to be Trump's "eyes and ears" regarding negative stories about him; additionally, the jury wanted to hear Pecker's testimony regarding an alleged phone call from Trump in which the two discussed a rumor that McDougal had gone to another outlet to publish her story.

On May 30 at 5:07 pm EDT, Trump was found guilty on all 34 counts, making him the first former U.S. president to be convicted of a felony. Merchan denied a defense motion for an acquittal.

== Aftermath ==
Trump had turned over two of the three pistols he was licensed for to the New York Police Department (NYPD) on March 31, 2023, with a third pistol moved to Florida. Trump's New York State concealed carry license was suspended on April 1, 2023, following his indictment on criminal charges. As of June 5, 2024, Trump's New York firearm license was expected to be revoked after the NYPD's legal bureau completes its investigation. On June 28, 2024, the New Jersey Division of Alcoholic Beverage Control declined to renew the liquor licenses for Trump National Golf Club in Bedminster and Colts Neck, instead issuing temporary permits.

On June 4, Blanche filed a motion to have the gag order lifted, stating: "Now that the trial is concluded, the concerns articulated by the government and the Court do not justify restrictions on the First Amendment rights of President Trump." On June 25, two days before the first 2024 U.S. presidential debate, Merchan partially lifted the gag order permitting Trump to comment on witnesses and jurors, but Trump cannot reveal the jurors' identities, nor comment about court staffers, the prosecution team or their families until after sentencing.

Trump's sentencing hearing was originally scheduled for July 11, 2024. On July 1, Trump's counsel requested to delay sentencing to consider the impact of the U.S. Supreme Court ruling in Trump v. United States released that day. On July 2, Merchan postponed the sentencing hearing to September 18. In August, Trump's team asked Merchan to again postpone the sentencing hearing until after the election, and the Manhattan DA stated that it would defer to Merchan on this matter. On September 6, Merchan postponed the sentencing hearing to November 26.

On July 1, 2024, the U.S. Supreme Court ruled in Trump v. United States, supporting presidential immunity for official acts committed by the seated president. Later that day, Trump's counsel requested permission to move to dismiss the conviction on the basis that some evidence presented in the trial constituted official actions by Trump. On December 16, Merchan ruled that the Supreme Court decision had no effect on Trump's conviction. Merchan stated that Trump's conduct pertains to personal acts and that any disputed evidence was "harmless in light of the overwhelming evidence of guilt".

Ultimately, on January 3, 2025, Merchan set a new sentencing hearing for January 10. Trump was sentenced to an unconditional discharge on January 10.

== Attempt to move to federal court ==
In 2024 Trump attempted to move the case to federal court. The attempt was still ongoing in 2026.
