= ARTEX =

Penetration Testing and Vulnerability Software

- Original author: Autumn-27
- Release: July 2026
- Written in: Go, Next.js
- License: Proprietary

ARTEX is an automated penetration testing and vulnerability scanning software. Originally released as open-source software, it migrated to a proprietary software license following its use in a series of cyberattacks targeting South Korea banks.

== History ==
Published in July 2026, ARTEX was originally released on GitHub by Autumn-27. The original ARTEX repository was removed from GitHub by the original author following ARTEX's use in cyberattacks targeting South Korean banks, although maintained community forks of the source code continue to exist.

ARTEX was the subject of a November 13, 2026 Federal Bureau of Investigation Cybersecurity Advisory due its observed ability to quickly compromise systems.

=== Use ===
ARTEX has been used in cyberattack campaigns, since at least August 2026, by black hat hackers and alleged government hackers in attacks on financial institutions, technology services, and government agencies, among others.

== Design ==
ARTEX provides a graphical user interface to issue natural language instructions to large language models via user supplied APIs and API keys. ARTEX's front end and back end are written in Next.js and Go, respectively.
