= Court artist =

A court artist may refer to:

- A court painter (or sculptor) – an artist who painted for the members of a royal court
- An artist who makes courtroom sketches
