= Joseph W. Papin =

American cartoonist (1931–1992)

Joseph Wood Papin
- Born: September 7, 1931; St. Louis, Missouri
- Died: March 9, 1992 (aged 60); New Jersey, United States
- Other name: Joe Papin
- Occupation: Artist
- Years active: 1957 to 1992
- Known for: Courtroom art, Illustrator

Joseph W. Papin, (September 7, 1931 – March 9, 1992) also known as Joe Papin was a reportorial artist, illustrator, courtroom sketch artist, and political cartoonist.

== Personal life ==
Papin was born September 7, 1931, in Saint Louis, Missouri. He attended Ohio State University where he received his Bachelor of Fine Arts in 1955. He became a commissioned Lieutenant for the U.S. Army in 1955 and worked for the Army Pictorial Center, where he made training films for the Defense Department. He married Jane Arlene Scatterday on June 25, 1955. They had five children. He died on March 9, 1992, at the age of 60 from melanoma.

== Career ==
Joe Papin's first assignment in New York City came from Russell Lynes, managing editor of Harper's Magazine. Ben Rathbun's article, "New York's gay old lady: Whatever is happening to the Times?" included a five-page spread of Joe's sketches of "behind-the-scenes at the New York Times.". After that his career took off. He was a freelance artist from 1957 to 1992, Papin's work appeared in USIA's American Illustrated, Harper's Magazine, Newsweek, Business Week, The Reporter, American Heritage, Forbes, Playboy, The National Review, and other specialty magazines. Among newspapers he contributed to the Herald Tribune, The New York Times, and worked on staff at The New York Daily News, where his reportorial drawings depicted the major trials for over twenty years and his illustrations and political cartoons accompanied editorial articles. He illustrated over forty-five adult and children's books, lectured at colleges and for professional societies, gave many demonstrations, and had his work featured in national art shows. His courtroom art collection of over 4,750 drawings is a part of the Courtroom Art Collection at the Library of Congress, Washington, D.C. Papin's work was a part of the Library of Congress exhibit "Drawing Justice: The Art of Courtroom Illustrations" which ran from April 27, 2017, to Dec 30, 2017. "While the legal system is generally open to all of us, courtroom artists open the door — via our newspapers, televisions and now computers — to gain privileged access to a trial," the library's Sara Duke, the show's curator, says of the unique role of these talents. "But artists don't act merely as recorders of a moment. They distill for us how people gesture, their relationships to other people in the room and moments of action in the court that define the trial."

=== Courtroom art ===
His drawings often accompanied Theo Wilson's articles. Theo Wilson, who also worked for the Daily News, described as the "best-known, most respected trial reporter in the world" by the New York Reporters Association, tells of some of the trials they covered together in her memoir Headline Justice, Inside the Courtroom- The Country's most Controversial Trials. Wilson refers to Papin's work as "remarkable" and Papin as a "miracle worker" due to his accomplishments during the Patty Hearst Trial. The art show "Reportage Drawing: Four Courtroom Artists," according to Robert Long of the East Hampton Star, brought "several of the most notable, most highly visible practitioners in the genre here. Joseph Papin, perhaps best known for his work for the Daily News (including a famous front-page rendition of David (Son of Sam) Berkowitz while under cross-examination), tends to work with heavy, fast strokes, with little filling in, when portraying emotional moments of a trial." His work was exhibited nationally along with eight other artists in an art show that traveled the U.S. "Papin's pen and ink drawings suggests the nervous energy, the vagaries, and the uncertainties of any trial" said Suzanne Owens, one of the curators of the Syracuse University art show. He was the recipient of seven Page One Awards for graphic excellence in journalism and the New York Press Club Art Award for Reportorial Art/Courtrooms: Outstanding Artist of the Year. Writer and editor Scott Edelman refers to "Joe Papin, famed courtroom sketch artist." While at the New York Daily News he covered most major trials in between the years 1970 and 1991, including such famous trials as Watergate, Patty Hearst, Jean Harris, the Son of Sam (David Berkowitz), and the Pizza Connection Trial.

=== The artist as reporter: Drawing on the scene ===
In 1959 American Artist Magazine featured an article about Papin entitled The Street is my Studio which detailed his work as a reportorial artist. Papin's work encompassed the areas usually covered by photographers. He drew U.N. scenes, military and international subjects, concerts, parades, horse races, hospital emergency rooms, and street scenes. New York Press Club's Byline Magazine wrote "Joe's facile pen captures news events at places where cameras may be barred." Author Nick Meglin said Joseph Papin, "carried a sketchbook and drew in subways, in coffee shops, on street corners." Eric Stenson of the Asbury Park Press said "Joseph Papin is a reporter... His pen interprets a story with images rather than words. Ken Aktins from the Denton Record-Chronicle said "Joe Papin is a reporter. He works for one of the largest newspapers in United States—the Daily News—and has covered some of the most historic moments in recent American history. His professional title is artist. The tools of his journalistic trade are an assortment of pens and a sketchpad." Atkins continues with "Papin has been drawing scenes of life—the grand and the commonplace...from a straightforward, objective viewpoint."

=== Papin's drawings and the Gotti Trial ===
Papin's work stirred up some trouble during the John Gotti Trial in 1986. Anthony Rampino and John Carneglia were not thrilled with the way they were being represented in Papin's drawings. And John Gotti did not like the fact that Papin was drawing the prosecutor too pretty. The headline of The Daily News article on September 5, 1986, read Our art D.O.A., Gotti Complains. "Reputed mob boss John Gotti and his pals threw boastful taunts at Daily News courtroom artist Joe Papin." A few days later another article appeared in the Daily News entitled Murder Ink Jabbing Pen at News. "Two pals of alleged crime boss John Gotti turned critic again yesterday, informing Daily News Courtroom illustrator Joe Papin they plan artistic retribution." Papin was told during an elevator encounter in Brooklyn General Courthouse that they are embarking on careers as sketch artists....We're working on a good drawing," ....We're going to publish it in the Mafia magazine." UPI United Press International published the story the next day.

== Awards ==
- Page One Award for Excellence in Journalism 1988. Presented to Joseph Papin by the Newspaper Guild of New York AFL-CIO, CLC, in the category "News and Feature Illustrations, Cartoons, Newspapers" for Jury Weighing Fate of Howard Beach Four, in the Daily News, December 11, 1987.
- Page One Award for Excellence in Journalism 1987. Presented to Joseph Papin by the Newspaper Guild of New York AFL-CIO, CLC, in the category "News and Feature Illustrations, Cartoons, Newspapers" for Did you Ever...in the Daily News, May 22, 1982.
- 1987 New York Press Club Award. Reportorial Art/Courtrooms:Outstanding Artist of the Year
- Page One Award for Excellence in Journalism, 1977. Presented to Joseph Papin by the Newspaper Guild of New York AFL-CIO, CLC, for his drawings of the Hearst trial in the Daily News, February 14, 1976.
- Page One Award for Excellence in Journalism 1976. Presented to Joseph Papin by the Newspaper Guild of New York for his series on Child Care Abuses in the Daily New. "Powerful, poignant illustration of the plight of children victims of child abuse."
- Page One Award for Excellence in Journalism, 1975. Presented to Joseph Papin by the Newspaper Guild of New York for his series of Watergate Courtroom Drawings. "Papin staggers one with scores of courtroom drawings, superbly executed under deadline pressure. His art is magnificent, almost Michelangelic, and captures perfectly the characters of the persons under scrutiny and the mood of the moment."
- Page One Award for Excellence in Journalism, 1974. Presented to Joseph Papin by the Newspaper Guild of New York for his The Throwaway Children in the Daily News. This award cites the "range and power of artist's skill illustrating article on young girls going into prostitution."
- Page One Award for Excellence in Journalism,1971. Presented to Joseph Papin by the Newspaper Guild of New York for his Criminal Court: Unequal Justice in the Daily News. Judges were "impressed by the versatility of his work."
- Society of Publication Designers Award for Excellence. Reportorial Coverage award for drawings at the National Convention of Nursing. Dallas, TX. American Journal of Nursing, 1968.
- American Artist, "The Street is My Studio." Featured in article about drawing in the streets,1959.
- Honorary Member of the New Jersey Honor Legion, 1985–1992.
- Honorary Member of the Honor Legion of the Police Department, City of New York], 1979–1992.

== Exhibitions and shows ==
- "Courtroom Artists Of New York City: Updates," Southern District Federal Court, N.Y., N.Y., 1991.
- "New York Salute To Courtroom Art," Formal national traveling show, 1991.
- "New York Salute To Court Room Art," John Jay College of Criminal Justice, New York, NY, 1990.
- "Courtroom Artists of New York City," Eastern District Federal Court, Brooklyn, NY, 1990.
- "Courtroom Artists of New York City," Southern District Federal Court (NYSD), 1989.
- "New York Salute to Courtroom Art," Federal Plaza, New York, NY, 1988.
- "New York Salute to Courtroom Art, "John Jay College Of Criminal Justice, New York, NY, 1987.
- Public Relations Officers Society Of New York (PROS) City Hall Proclamation of "New Salute to Courtroom Art Week," 1987.
- "The Players Salute Courtroom Artists," Players Club, New York, NY, 1987.
- "New York Salute to Courtroom Art," Society of Illustrators, New York, NY, 1987.
- "Reportorial Artist: Joseph Papin," Manhattan Savings Bank, 1987.
- "Courtroom Art," New York Technical College, 1986.
- "Reportage Drawing: Four Courtroom Artists," Bologna Landi Gallery, East Hampton, NY, 1985.
- "Courtroom Art," Traveling Show, three years, Lowe Art Gallery, Syracuse University, 1979–1982.
- "Criminal Proceedings," Clock Tower Building, New York, NY, 1981.
- "Courtroom Scenes," Annual Art Exhibition, The Association of the Bar of the City Of New York, 1978.
- Special Guest Artist, Showcase IV, Monmouth County Arts Council, NJ, 1976.
- Featured Artist, Showcase III, Monmouth County Arts Council, NJ, 1975.
- National Cartoonist's Society Show, Lambs Club, New York, NY, 1972.
- "Bull-Fighting in Portugal," Portuguese National Travel Agency, New York, NY, 1967.
- Judged the New Jersey Fall Festival Of Arts (with Donald De Lue), NJ, 1967.
- Pan American Gallery, New York, NY, 1966.
- McGraw Hill Gallery, One-person show, New York, NY, 1962.
- J. W. Thompson Gallery, One-person show, New York, NY, 1959.

== Books illustrated ==
- Agle, Nan Hayden, and Bacon, Frances Atchinson. The Ingenious John Banvard. New York: Seabury Press, 1966.
- Associated Press. The World in 1976. USA: George Banta Company, 1977.
- Benedict, Dorothy Potter. Bandoleer. New York: Pantheon Books, 1963.
- Benedict, Dorothy Potter. Fabulous. New York: Pantheon Books, 1961.
- Bowen, Walter S., and Neal, Harry Edward. The United States Secret Service. New York: Popular Library, 1961.
- Bullfinch's Mythology. The Age of Fable. New York: Nelson Doubleday, 1968.
- Cabell, Charles A., and St. Clair, David. Safari. Garden City, New York: Pan Am & Doubleday and Company, 1968.
- Catherall, Arthur. Camel Caravan. New York: The Seabury Press, 1968.
- Channel, A. R. Karawane in Gefahr. Stuttgart: Schweizer Jugend-Varlag Solothurn, 1968.
- Christopher, Bruce. The God Player. New York: The American Billiard Review, 1975.
- Davidson, Marshall B. The American Heritage History of Antiques. New York: American Heritage Publishing Company, 1969.
- Drury, Allen. A Senate Journal. New York: McGraw-Hill, 1963.
- Folsom, Franklin. Famous Pioneers. Irvington on Hudson, New York: Harvey House, 1963.
- Gaan, Margaret. Last Moments of a World. (Condensed edition). New York: Reader's Digest Association, 1979.
- Gard, Robert E., and Semmes, David. America's Players. New York: The Seabury Press, 1967.
- Gaustat, Edwin Scott. Historical Atlas of Religion in America. New York: Harper and Row, 1962.
- Govan, Christine Noble, And West, Emmy. The Mystery of the Dancing Skeleton. New York: Sterling Publishing Company, 1962.
- Guthrie, A. B. The Blue Hen's Chick. New York: McGraw Hill, 1965.
- Hathaway, Lulu, and Heppe, Margaret. They Lived Their Love. New York: Friendship Press. 1966.
- Heaps, Willard A. The Story of Ellis Island. New York: The Seabury Press, 1967.
- Heaps, Willard A. Wandering Workers. New York: Crown Publishers, 1968.
- Honan, William H. The Greenwich Village Guide. New York: The Bryan Publications, Inc., 1959.
- Jaworski, Leon. The Right and the Power. (Condensed edition). New York: Reader's Digest Association, 1977.
- Josephy, Alvin M. The American Heritage History of the Congress of the United States. New York: American Heritage Publishing Company, 1975.
- Kenrick, Bruce. Come Out the Wilderness. New York: Harper & Brothers, 1962.
- Lurie, Richard G. Passports and Profits. Garden City, New York: Doubleday and Company, 1964.
- Masters, Robert V. The Story of Fires and Firefighting. New York: Sterling Publishing Company, 1962.
- McCaig, Robert. That Nester Kid. New York: Charles Scribner's Sons, 1961.
- Naylor, Phyllis Reynolds. The Dark Side of the Moon. Philadelphia: Fortress Press, 1963.
- Pahk, Induk. The Hour of The Tiger. New York: Harper and Row, 1965.
- Reader's Digest Association. Fireside Reader. Pleasantville, New York: Reader's Digest Associate, 1978.
- Salesbury, Joyce. Iberian Popular Religion. New York: Edwin Mellen Press, 1985.
- Scovel, Myra. Richer By India. New York: Harper and Row, 1964.
- Scovel, Myra. To Lay A Hearth. New York: Harper and Row, 1968.
- Selvin, David F. The Other San Francisco. New York: The Seaberry Press, 1969.
- Silk, Leonard. Economic Commentary: Reflections and Critiques from the Pages of Business Week. Business Week, 1966.
- Taylor, Robert Lewis. A Journey to Matecumbe. New York: McGraw Hill, 1961.
- Traub, James. Too Good to Be True. New York: Doubleday, 1990.
- Van Doren, Charles. Growing Up in the Great Depression. New York: Hill And Wang, 1963.
- Van Doren, Charles Growing Up in Colonial America. New York: Sterling Publishing Company, 1961.
- Van Doren, Charles. Growing Up in the Wild West. New York: Sterling Publishing Company, 1961.
- Weiss, David A. The Great Fire of London. New York: Crown Publishers, 1968.
- Welfing, Weeden. Principles of Economics. New York: McGraw Hill, 1971.
- Werstein, Irving. The Trespassers. New York: E. P. Dutton and Company, 1969.
- Winn, Dilys. Murder Ink. New York: Workman Publishing, 1977.
- Wood, Clement Biddle. Welcome to the Club. New York: McGraw Hill Book Company, 1966.
- Wood, James Playsted. Washington_D.C Washington, D.C. New York: The Seabury Press, 1966.
