= Watering hole attack =

Computer attack strategy

Watering hole is a computer attack strategy in which an attacker guesses or observes which websites an organization's users frequent and then uses one or more of the websites to distribute malware. Eventually, some member of the targeted users will become infected. Attackers looking for specific information may only target users coming from a specific IP address. This also makes the attacks harder to detect and research. The name is derived from a strategy of predators in the natural world, who wait for an opportunity to attack their prey near watering holes. The attack strategy was named in The RSA Blog in 2012.

One of the most significant dangers of watering hole attacks is that they are executed via legitimate websites that cannot be easily blacklisted. Also, the scripts and malware used in these attacks are often meticulously created, making it challenging for an antivirus software to identify them as threats.

== Examples ==
=== 2011 Operation Torpedo ===
In Operation Torpedo, the United States government conducted an attack on 3 Tor websites. The FBI seized access to the websites and continued to run them for a 19 day period. During this time the websites were modified to deliver a NIT, which would attempt to unmask visitors by revealing their IP address, operating system and web browser. The NIT code was revealed as part of the case USA v Cottom et al. Researchers from University of Nebraska at Kearney and Dakota State University reviewed the NIT code and found that it was an Adobe Flash application that would ping a user's real IP address back to an FBI controlled server, rather than routing their traffic through the Tor network and protecting their identity. It used a technique from Metasploit's decloaking engine and only affected users who had not updated their Tor web browser.

=== 2012 US Council on Foreign Relations ===
In December 2012, the Council on Foreign Relations website was found to be hosting malware targeting a zero-day vulnerability in Microsoft's Internet Explorer. In this attack, the malware was only deployed to users using Internet Explorer set to English, Chinese, Japanese, Korean and Russian.

=== 2013 Havex ICS software supply chain attack ===
Havex was discovered in 2013 and is one of five known Industrial Control System (ICS) tailored malware developed in the past decade. Energetic Bear began utilizing Havex in a widespread espionage campaign targeting energy, aviation, pharmaceutical, defense, and petrochemical sectors. The campaign targeted victims primarily in the United States and Europe. Havex exploited supply chain and watering-hole attacks on ICS vendor software in addition to spear phishing campaigns to gain access to victim systems.

=== 2013 US Department of Labor ===
In mid-2013, attackers used the United States Department of Labor website to disseminate an exploit that gathered information on users that visited the website. This attack specifically targeted users visiting pages with nuclear-related content.

=== 2015 Operation Pacifier ===
In Operation Pacifier the U.S. government seized a Tor website and installed a malware based NIT to hack into the web browsers of users accessing the site, thereby revealing their identities. The operation led to the arrest of 956 site users and five prison sentences.

=== 2016 Polish banks ===
In late 2016, a Polish bank discovered malware on the institution's computers. It is believed that the source of this malware was the web server of the Polish Financial Supervision Authority. There have been no reports on any financial losses as a result of this.

=== 2017 Montreal-based International Civil Aviation Organization attack ===
There was an organization-level watering-hole attack in Montreal from 2016–2017 by an unknown entity causing a data breach.

=== 2017 CCleaner attack ===
From August to September 2017, the installation binary of CCleaner distributed by the vendor's download servers included malware. CCleaner is a popular tool used to clean potentially unwanted files from Windows computers, widely used by security-minded users. The distributed installer binaries were signed with the developer's certificate making it likely that an attacker compromised the development or build environment and used this to insert malware.

=== 2017 NotPetya attack ===
In June 2017, the NotPetya (also known as ExPetr) malware, believed to have originated in Ukraine, compromised a Ukrainian government website. The attack vector was from users of the site downloading it. The malware erases the contents of victims' hard drives.

=== 2018 Chinese country-level attack ===
There was a country-level watering-hole attack in China from late 2017 into March 2018, by the group "LuckyMouse" also known as "Iron Tiger", "EmissaryPanda", "APT 27" and "Threat Group-3390."

=== 2018 Controversy of U.S. mass surveillance/invasion of privacy ===
In the U.S. a joint civil suit filed by the American Civil Liberties Union (ACLU), Civil Liberties and Transparency Clinic, and Privacy International against various branches of the U.S. Government alleged that the U.S. government had been using watering hole attacks in a new mass invasion of privacy of ordinary citizens. Further, the nature of the civil suit was a failure to comport relevant documents as part of a FOIA request to the various agencies. ACLU and Privacy International et al v. United States Agencies docket available on Courtlistener.com

=== 2019 Holy Water Campaign ===
In 2019, a watering-hole attack, called Holy Water, targeted Asian religious and charity groups. Victims were prompted to update Adobe Flash which triggered the attack. It was creative and distinct due to its fast evolution. The motive remains unclear. Experts provided a detailed technical analysis along with a long list of Indicators of Compromise (IoCs) involved in the campaign, but none could be traced back to an Advanced Persistent Threat.

== Defense techniques ==
The targeted users can defend against the malware distributed in a watering hole attack, at least in the case of known vulnerabilities, by applying the latest software patches to remove vulnerabilities that would allow the target to be infected. Organisations, both targeted and running web servers, can monitor their websites and networks and then block traffic if malicious content is detected. Using defensive tools such as firewalls or anti-virus software on target devices may also protect from attacks.
