= Elizabeth Williams (artist) =

American courtroom artist

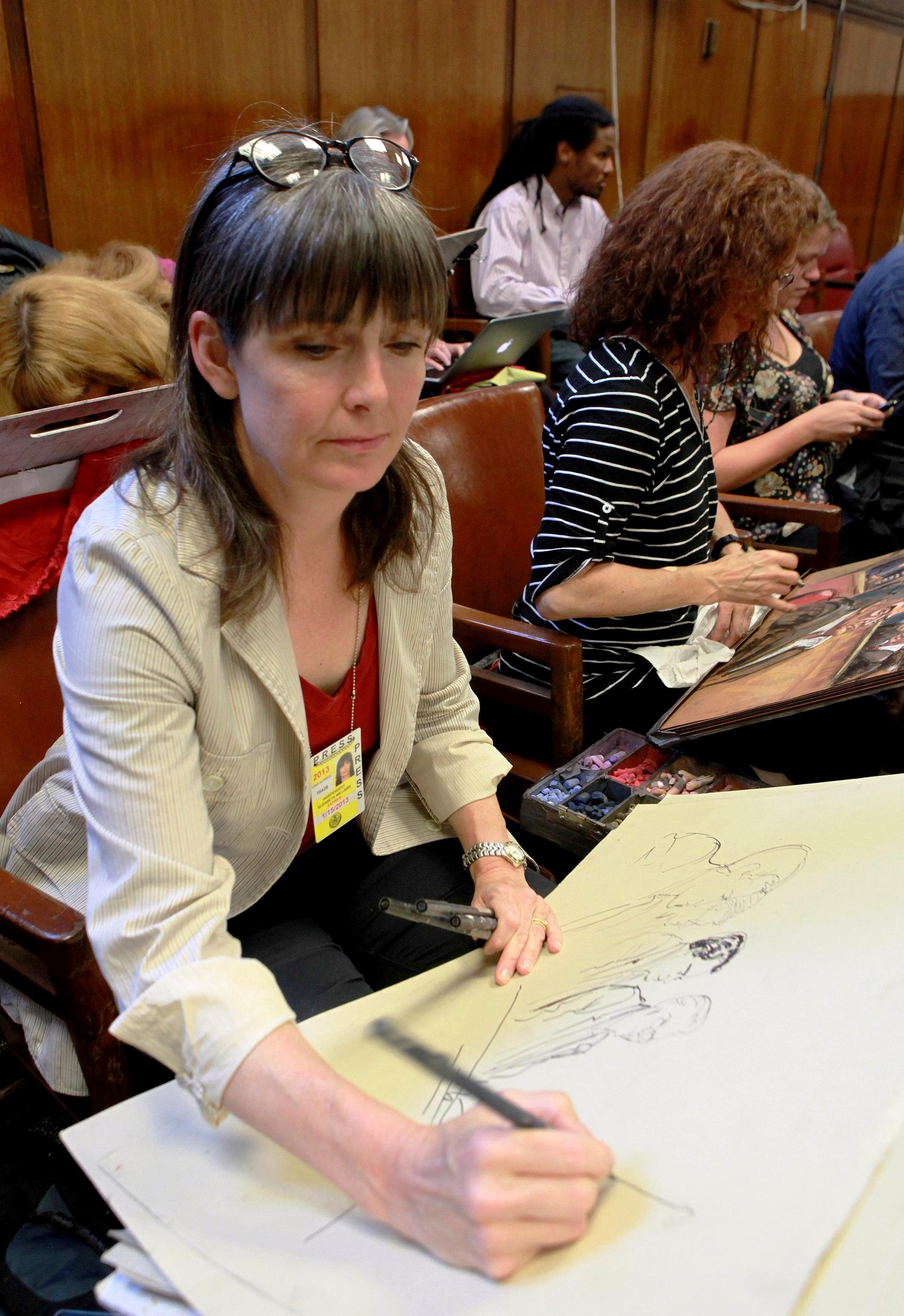
- Courtroom artist Elizabeth Williams sketching Dominique Strauss-Kahn at his New York court hearing on July 1, 2011
- Education: Washington University in St. Louis; Parsons The New School for Design; Syracuse University; Otis Art Institute
- Alma mater: Parsons The New School for Design
- Occupations: Illustrator; Author
- Known for: Courtroom artist

Elizabeth Williams is an American illustrator, courtroom artist and author based in New York City. She has covered many high-profile court cases such as those of John DeLorean, Martha Stewart, John Gotti, Michael Milken, Bernard Madoff, Dominique Strauss-Khan, Michael Cohen, and the Times Square Bomber. Williams is the author with true crime writer Sue Russell of The Illustrated Courtroom: 50 Years of Court Art, a history of American courtroom sketch artistry published by CUNY Journalism Press in 2014.

== Career ==
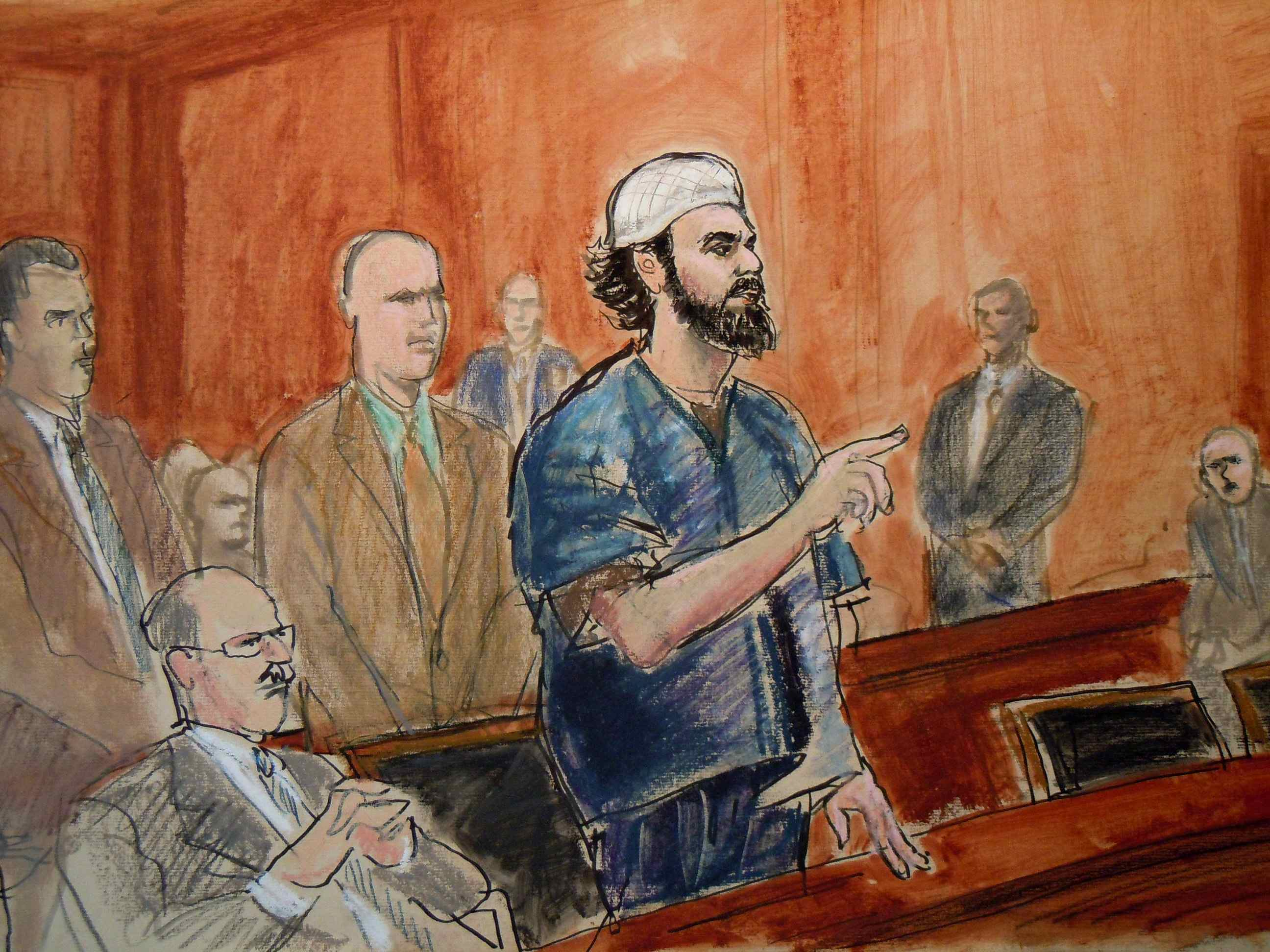
FAISAL SHAHZAD, THE "TIMES SQUARE BOMBER" SENTENCING, MANHATTAN FEDERAL COURT: OCTOBER 5, 2010

Williams’ career began in Hollywood, California, where she was a fashion illustrator for designers such as Michael Travis and in the atelier of Bob Mackie. Following the suggestion of a teacher she decided to pursue the possible career as a court artist. While working as a fashion illustrator she went to an art show in San Diego, California, where she saw the courtroom art of well-known sketch artist Bill Robles. After a meeting with Robles, she began to work as a courtroom artist. The first court case she covered was the San Bernardino, California hearing of a child molester in 1980.

After Williams met Robles at a trial in Los Angeles, California, that they were both covering and he began to mentor her. The first high-profile trial she covered was the 1984 drug trafficking trial of John DeLorean for Los Angeles-based channel KABC-TV. Later that year Williams returned to her native New York and began working as a courtroom artist in New York City. While in New York City, Williams gained a reputation for reporting on white-collar crime. She covered the trials inside traders Ivan Boesky, Michael Milken, Raj Rajaratnam, and Martha Stewart. Williams also reported on the trials of financial figures such as Bernard Madoff, Bernard Ebbers, and Dominique Strauss-Khan. Non-financial trials reported on by Williams include those of John Gotti, Faisal Shahzad, Abu Anas al Libi, Anna Chapman, Ghislaine Maxwell, and Sean Combs.

In 2012, 61 of Williams’ sketches depicting the Sean Bell trial were acquired by the Lloyd Sealy Library at the John Jay College of Criminal Justice.

Along with crime writer Sue Russell, Williams authored The Illustrated Courtroom: 50 Years of Court Art, which was published in 2014 by CUNY Journalism Press. The book is a retrospective of American courtroom sketch art of high-profile trials produced from 1964 to 2014 and contains work from artists Howard Brodie, Aggie Kenny, Bill Robles, Richard Tomlinson, and Williams.

== Education and style ==
Williams studied art at the Sam Fox School of Design & Visual Arts at Washington University in St. Louis, the Parsons The New School for Design, Syracuse University and the Otis Art Institute. Much of her artwork is created with brush pens, colored pencils, oil pastel and oil paint sticks.
