= Art Lien =

American sketch artist

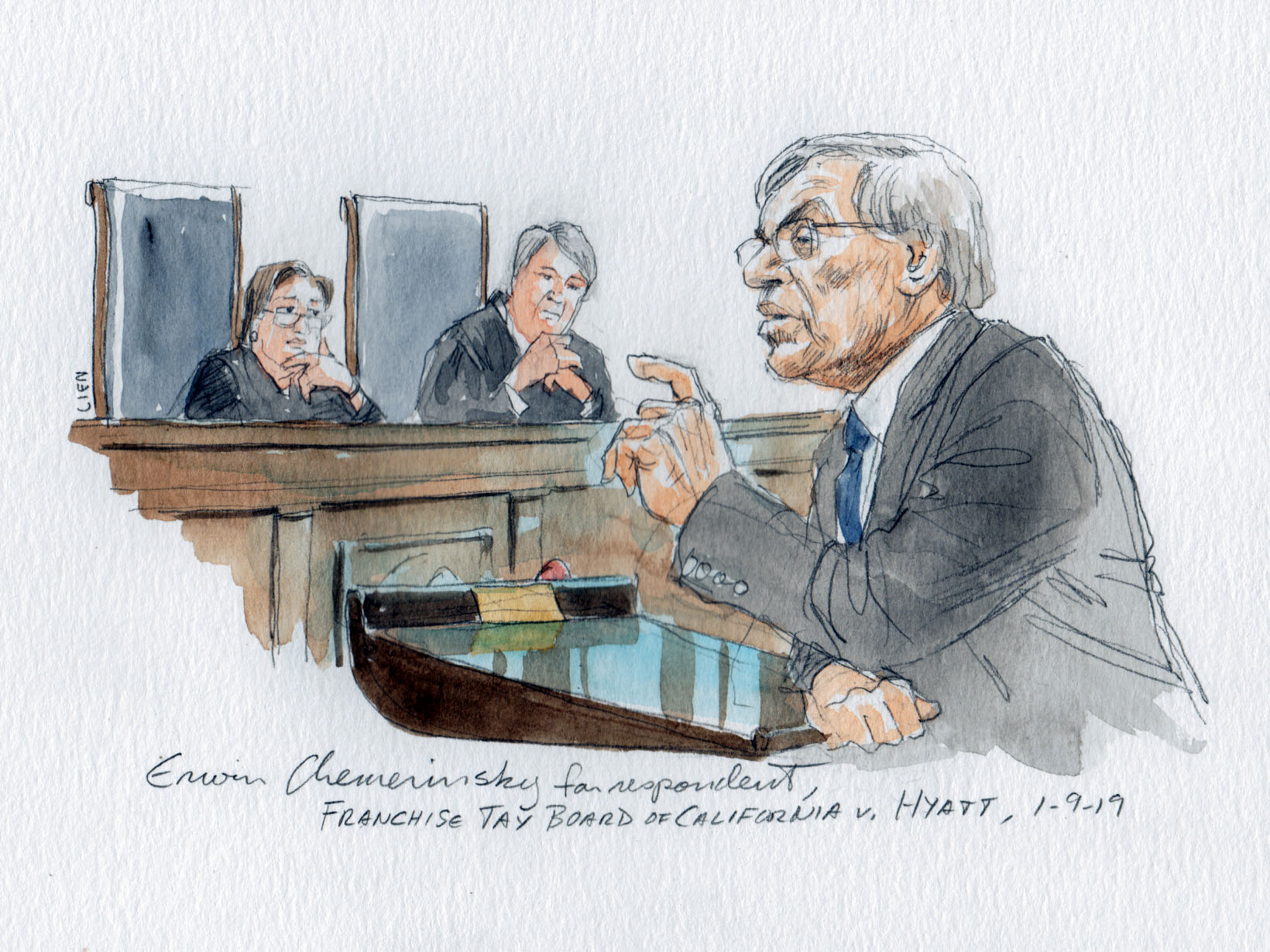
An example of Lien's sketch style depicting a moment during Supreme Court oral arguments.

Arthur Lien is an American sketch artist best known for his work depicting the proceedings of the United States Supreme Court. He began his career in courtroom sketch artistry in 1976 after graduating from Maryland Institute College of Art. By 1978, he was the Supreme Court sketch artist for CBS. At the time, many news organizations had their own sketch artist on staff to cover state and federal legislatures and courts, few of which allowed cameras. In the 1980s, many legislatures and courts began to allow video recording of their proceedings. Since then the number of court sketch artists has dwindled. Because the Supreme Court does not allow photography of its proceedings, Lien was one of few artists still sketching courtroom activities. His sketches were used by a number of news organizations including the New York Times, NBC News, and SCOTUSblog.

After Lien retired in the summer of 2022, SCOTUSblog assembled tributes from lawyers and journalists that had relied on Lien's work during their careers. In particular, Lien was praised for preparing illustrations of the remote Supreme Court oral arguments held during the COVID-19 pandemic.
