= Courtroom sketch =

Drawings of court proceedings

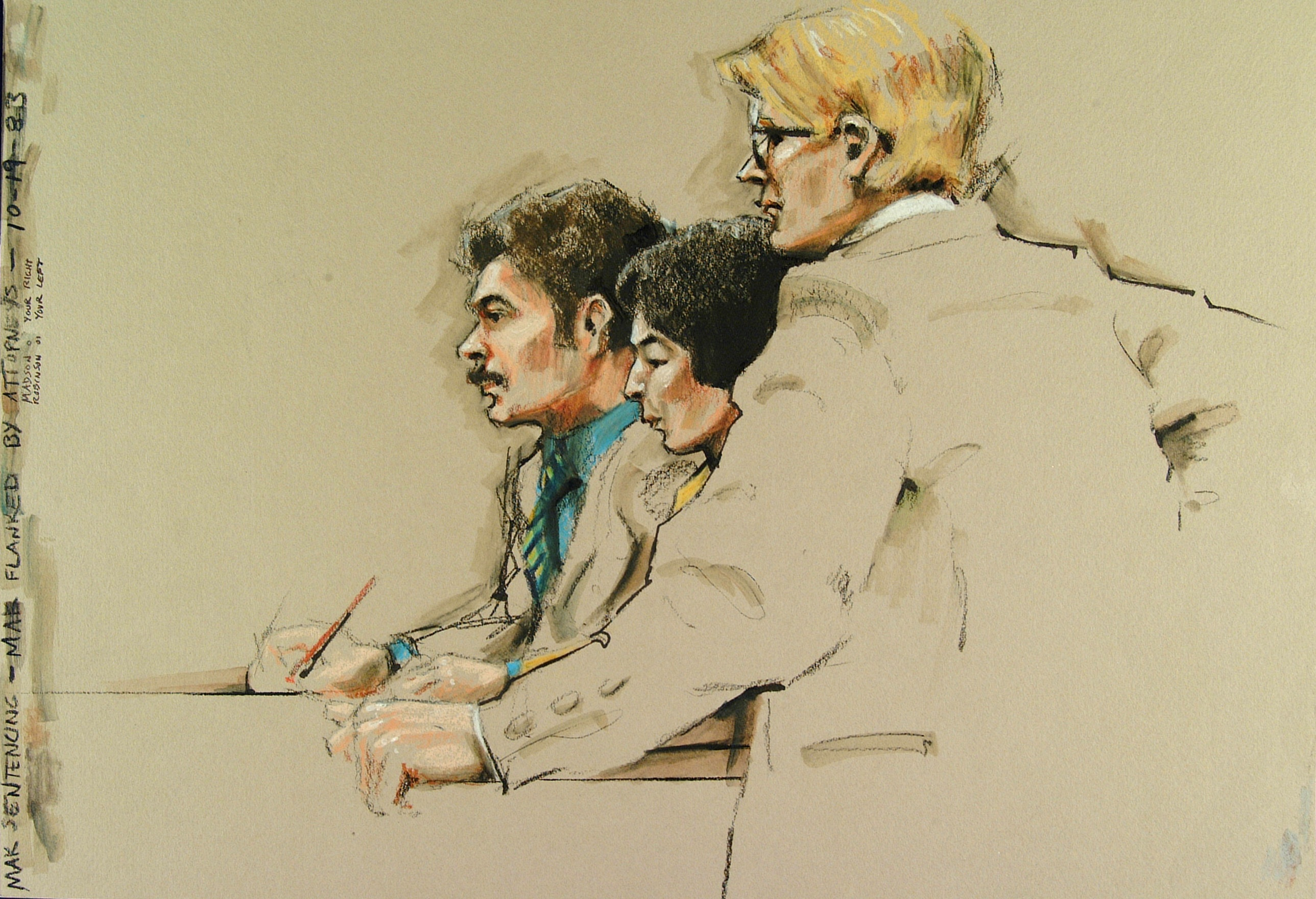
A courtroom sketch by Butch Krieger of an accused person flanked by two attorneys, drawn in about eight minutes.

A courtroom sketch is an artistic depiction of the proceedings in a court of law. In many jurisdictions, the use of cameras in courtrooms is generally prohibited in order to prevent distractions and preserve privacy. This requires news media to rely on sketch artists for illustrations of the proceedings.

== Creation ==
Courtroom sketch artists attend judicial proceedings as members of the public or as credentialed media depending on the venue and jurisdiction. Judges may require or allow artists to sit in a designated area or they may sit in general public seating. In some jurisdictions, including the United Kingdom and Hong Kong, courtroom artists are not permitted to sketch proceedings while in court and must create sketches from memory or notes after leaving the courtroom.

Courtroom artists can quickly capture a moment on paper and then sell their work to media outlets who would otherwise be denied a visual record of the trial. They may be paid per sketch or on a per diem commission. Sketches are often sold to television stations, newswire services, newspapers, or the subjects of a sketch. Courtroom sketches may also be acquired by institutional archives. The entire set of courtroom sketches related to the Lindy Chamberlain trial were purchased by the National Museum of Australia from the Australian Broadcasting Corporation. Selected works of American court artists Richard Tomlinson and Elizabeth Williams are held at the Lloyd Sealy Library at the John Jay College of Criminal Justice. Other collections of courtroom art include the works of Howard Brodie held in the Library of Congress, the Collection of the Supreme Court of the United States, which holds selected court artwork from artist Aggie Kenny, and early 20th century examples by William Hartley at the Crime Museum in London.

A courtroom artist must work quickly, particularly during arraignment hearings where a witness may appear in court for only a few minutes. A television-ready illustration can be produced in that time, and viewed on television after a court proceeding is finished. Courtroom artists can be barred from drawing alleged victims of sexual abuse, minors, and jurors or some witnesses in high-profile trials.

== In the United States ==
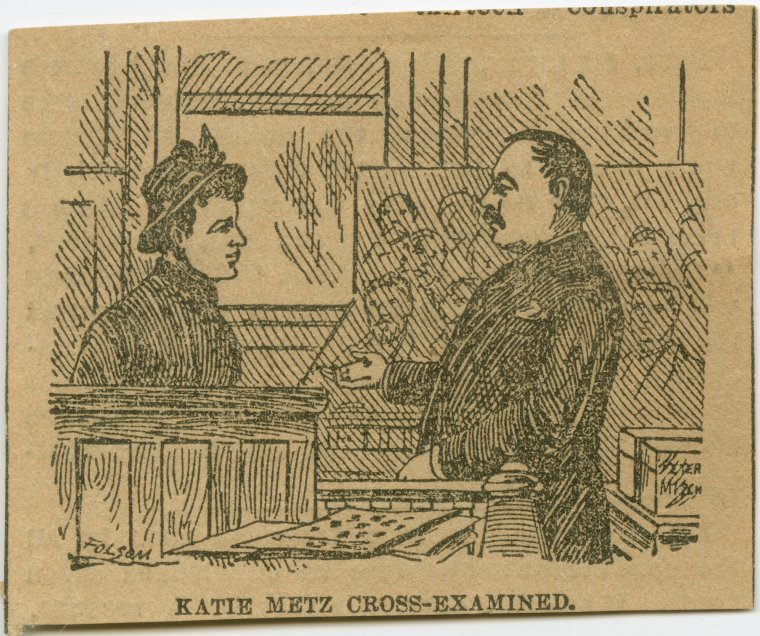
An 1889 courtroom sketch from the trial of ex-Alderman Thomas Cleary, which was published in The New York Times.

Courtroom sketches in the United States date back as far as the 19th century. Courtroom sketch artists were present for the trial of abolitionist John Brown and the impeachment of Andrew Johnson. By the mid-19th century, there were well-known court artists and printmakers such as George Caleb Bingham and David G. Blyth. Sketches during this era were reproduced as engravings in print publications, because photography was not a practical option for courtroom news coverage.

As mass media technology advanced in the early twentieth century, courts began experimenting with allowing photography and radio broadcasts of court proceedings. Following the media "circus" surrounding the trial of Bruno Richard Hauptmann for the Lindbergh kidnapping, broadcasts from federal courtrooms were banned by Rule 53 of the Federal Rules of Criminal Procedure. Additionally, the American Bar Association adopted Judicial Canon 35, which prohibited the use of motion or still cameras in the courtroom and was codified into law by the majority of states. On the other hand, no state or federal court prohibited the publication of courtroom sketches and courtroom sketch artistry continued.

In 1973, courtroom artist Aggie Whelan (Kenny) was hired by CBS to illustrate the Gainesville Eight trial. The judge presiding over the trial, Winston Arnow, ordered that no sketches were to be made in the courtroom and that no sketches of the trial be published, even if those sketches were made outside of the court from memory. In the United States v. Columbia Broadcasting System (1974), the Fifth Circuit of Appeals overruled the trial judge's order and protected Aggie Whelan's right to create sketches and CBS's right to broadcast courtroom sketches. The restrictions were too broad and violated both CBS and Whelan's First Amendment rights.

Television networks began using sketches to illustrate courtroom events during news broadcasts in the 1960s. As long as the artist arrived on time, and did not disturb the proceedings by making unnecessary noise, their presence was rarely challenged in most jurisdictions. In jurisdictions where artists were restricted from sketching inside the courtroom, they created sketches from memory. Courtroom artists including Ida Libby Dengrove protested these restrictions, and gradually courtrooms began allowing sketch artists to work during trials whilst seated in the public gallery.

The reintroduction of cameras into courtrooms has been credited with a decline in courtroom sketch artists. By 1987, courtroom photography was allowed in 44 states. While the creation of Court TV and the O. J. Simpson murder case did cause renewed debate on whether or not courtroom photography should be allowed, all 50 states allowed the use of courtroom photography by 2014.

=== Notable American courtroom artists ===
Notable American courtroom artists include Howard Brodie, Marguerite Martyn, Bill Robles, Carole Kabrin, Aggie Whelan Kenny, Elizabeth Williams, Jane Rosenberg, Christine Cornell (WNBC and CNN), Art Lien (NBC, SCOTUSblog), Marilyn Church (The New York Times), Richard Tomlinson (WNEW-TV), and Joseph W. Papin (The New York Daily News).

One of the most well-known courtroom artists was Walt Stewart, whose career began with the trial of Jack Ruby. Over the next 35 years while on retainer by various networks, he covered famous trials such as the Manson Family, Soledad Brothers, Angela Davis and Patty Hearst. His work now hangs in museums and his sketches of the Patty Hearst trial were purchased by Liza Minnelli.

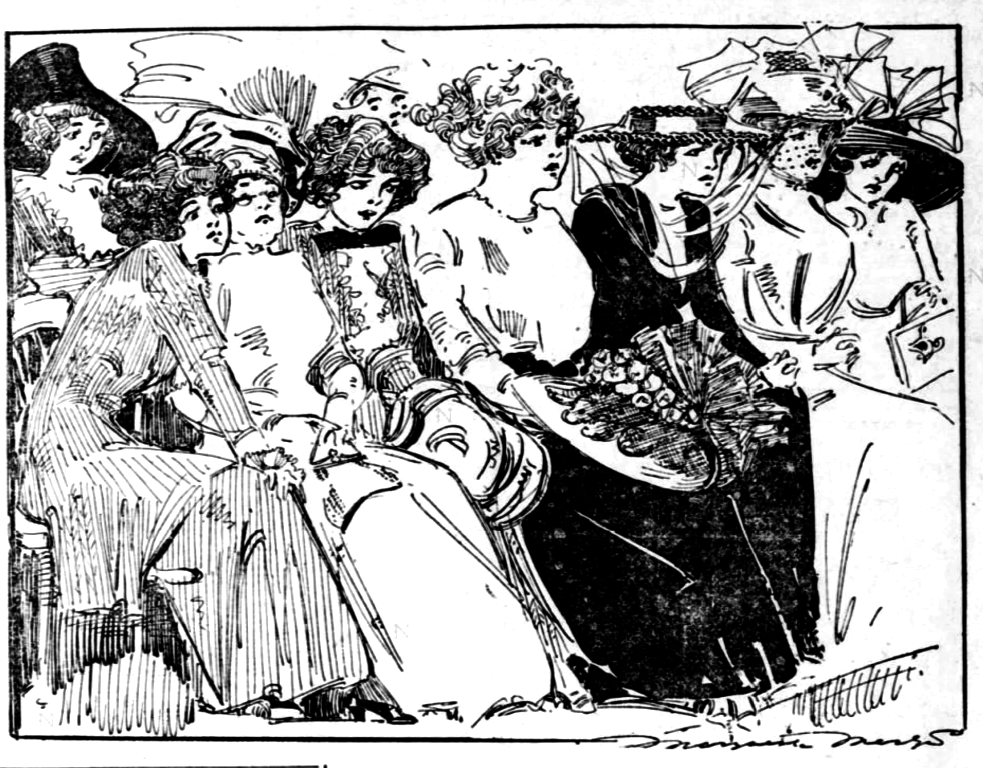
Reporter-artist Marguerite Martyn made this sketch of spectators at the murder trial of Dora Doxey, printed in the St. Louis Post-Dispatch on 2 June 1910.

Joseph W. Papin worked for The New York Daily News from 1969 to 1992 and covered most of the major American trials during that period of time. Among them, the Watergate hearings, the Patty Hearst, Son of Sam (David Berkowitz), The Pizza Connection, and the Jean Harris trial.

Howard Brodie was a courtroom artist whose work included covering the trials of Jack Ruby, Sirhan Sirhan, William Calley, Charles Manson, Patty Hearst, and the Chicago Seven. He primarily worked for the CBS Evening News and anchor Walter Cronkite coined the term "artist-correspondent" to describe his work. Prior to becoming a courtroom artist, Brodie was a combat artist during World War II and a staff artist for the San Francisco Chronicle. Brodie's work is held in the Library of Congress and he was inducted into the Society of Illustrators Hall of Fame in 2001.

Bill Robles is an Emmy Award-nominated courtroom artist whose work includes covering the trials of Charles Manson, O. J. Simpson, Ted Kaczynski, Timothy McVeigh, Terry Nichols, Richard Ramirez, Rodney King, and Michael Jackson. The first trial Robles covered as a television news courtroom artist was the trial of Manson.

Aggie Whelan Kenny is a courtroom artist known for her work on covering the Supreme Court of the United States and trials including James Earl Ray, David Berkowitz, and Jerry Sandusky. Kenny received an Emmy for her work for the CBS Evening News on the trials of John N. Mitchell and Maurice Stans. Her work is included in the Collection of the Supreme Court of the United States. Kenny's sketches of Gainesville Eight trial led to the court case United States v. Columbia Broadcasting System (1974), which established the right of courtroom artists to create sketches and for those sketches to be broadcast on television.

Elizabeth Williams has covered the trials of John DeLorean, Martha Stewart, John Gotti, Michael Milken, Bernard Madoff, Dominique Strauss-Kahn, and the Times Square Bomber. She is best known for her coverage of white-collar criminals tried in New York City. Her sketches depicting the Sean Bell trial are held by the Lloyd Sealy Library at the John Jay College of Criminal Justice.

Actor Terry Crews stated in an appearance on Jimmy Kimmel Live! that his first job in the entertainment industry was as the courtroom sketch artist for WJRT in Flint, Michigan.

== See also ==
- Sketch
- History of journalism
- Category:Courtroom sketch artists
