= Jane Rosenberg =

American courtroom artist

Jane Rosenberg is an American courtroom artist known for her pastel sketches of high-profile defendants, including Donald Trump, Harvey Weinstein, Jeffrey Epstein, Sean Combs, Tom Brady and Bill Cosby.

== Biography ==
Rosenberg studied fine art at the Art Students League of New York, where abstract art was more popular than her preferred realism. She describes herself as having been a "closet portrait artist", drawing portraits in her kitchen. After graduating, she worked as a portrait artist in Provincetown, Massachusetts, sketching tourists for a dollar and busking by reproducing famous paintings in sidewalk chalk. When Rosenberg attended a lecture by courtroom artist Marilyn Church at the Society of Illustrators, she was inspired to attempt courtroom sketches herself.

To prepare a portfolio, Rosenberg began to attend the evening sessions of the New York City Criminal Court, where she sketched prostitutes at their arraignments. When she asked a court officer where the artists sat, he invited her to join them in the jury box the following week during the arraignment of Craig Crimmins. CNN declined to buy the sketch, but Rosenberg successfully sold it to NBC, which aired the image on the evening news. The 1980 sale began Rosenberg's career as a courtroom artist.

Rosenberg, who has now worked as a courtroom sketch artist for more than 40 years, lives on the Upper West Side of Manhattan, near Columbia University. She is married to a criminal defense attorney whom she met at a courthouse; the couple have one child.

== Works ==
=== Media ===
Rosenberg works in pen, pencil, and pastel to produce her courtroom sketches. The pastels present problems when she covers out-of-state cases; they break easily during travel, and can appear to be bullets during security screenings. Her kit also includes a cushion, a foam board to rest her drawing on, binoculars, finger cots, protein bars, and water bottles. She transports her supplies in a large wheeled container; inside, a smaller box, held together with rubber bands and gaffer's tape, holds her pastels, sorted by color. After each day in court, Rosenberg spends at least half an hour cleaning and organizing her equipment, discarding the stubs of pastels, and ordering replacements.

=== Subjects ===
In addition to defendants, Rosenberg sketches jurors and witnesses, whom she often depicts with blank faces to protect their anonymity. In some cases, judges rule that she cannot depict vulnerable witnesses. The nature of her job means that she has to draw quickly, and sometimes observe from a video monitor in an overflow room, which Rosenberg dislikes. Defendants sometimes approach Rosenberg to make requests about their depictions: John Gotti asked her not to draw his double chin, Weinstein wanted more hair, and Donald Trump Jr. said to "make me look sexy." Others, including Ghislaine Maxwell, Eddie Murphy, and Igor Fruman, have sketched Rosenberg themselves.

Rosenberg generally works on high-profile cases. Her subjects have included:

- 6ix9ine
- Abu Hamza al-Masri
- Anthony Weiner
- Bernie Madoff
- Bill Cosby
- Caroline Ellison
- Craig Crimmins
- Derek Chauvin
- Don King
- Donald Trump
- Donald Trump Jr.
- Dzhokhar Tsarnaev
- Eddie Murphy
- Ghislaine Maxwell
- Jeffrey Epstein
- Joaquín Guzmán
- John Gotti
- John Louis Evans
- Harvey Weinstein
- Luigi Mangione
- Lynne Stewart
- Mark David Chapman
- Martha Stewart
- Michael Cohen
- Omar Abdel-Rahman
- R. Kelly
- Sam Bankman-Fried
- Steve Bannon
- Tom Brady
- Woody Allen

Rosenberg has described Don King and Donald Trump as fun to draw. By contrast, she was traumatized by sketching the 1983 execution of John Louis Evans, and came to oppose the death penalty as a result.
