= William Vandercreek =

American lawyer

William (Bill) VanDercreek (January 6, 1930 – February 20, 2012) was a Professor of the Law School of Florida State University. He taught civil procedure and complex litigation courses and at the College of Law from 1968 until his retirement in 1993. He was Moot Court advisor for twenty-five years.

William VanDercreek was born on January 6, 1930, in Iowa. He died in Tallahassee, Florida, on February 20, 2012. He studied at Iowa State University, at University of Iowa College of Law and at Yale University.

== Background ==
At Yale, VanDercreek was honored as a Sterling Fellow.

William VanDercreek served a period as a First Lieutenant in the United States Marine Corps

William VanDercreek was one of the lawyers for the defense representing Jack Ruby in the trial of the killing of Lee Harvey Oswald. He filed a petition with the Texas Supreme Court requesting a ruling on whether witnesses to the shooting of Lee Harvey Oswald could be a juror at Ruby's trial.

In 1974, VanDercreek met Mel Fisher and got involved in the litigations regarding the ownership of the treasures that Mel Fisher and his company found. In 2007, Mel Fisher's Treasures won the Adjudication granting them the title to the treasures recovered on the Atocha and Margarita wreck sites in 2007. William VanDercreek assisted Mel Fisher's Treasures Company in this litigation.

During the last several years of his life William VanDercreek worked, pro bono, to urge the United States Sentencing Commission to make the new crack cocaine guidelines retroactive. This would change the fate of a vast number of persons now incarcerated for life.

== Personal life ==
William VanDercreek was married to Catherine VanDercreek, they had five children.

== Published works ==
- VanDercreek, William; Moore, James (1981). Federal procedure: a problem-solving textual analysis of federal judicial and administrative procedure.
