= Financial services in South Korea =

Financial services in South Korea refers to the services provided in ROK by the finance industry: banks, investment banks, insurance companies, credit card companies, consumer finance companies, government sponsored enterprises, and stock brokerages.

== Foreign banks ==
Foreign banks (Citibank, HSBC, Deutsche Bank, etc.) which have a presence in ROK are not international branches, but rather wholly Korean entities, due to Korean law. The branches must obtain a banking license from the Korean Financial Services Commission (FSC).

== International ATMs ==
Korean citizens may apply for an international ATM card corresponding to an interbank network such as Cirrus or PLUS, but foreign residents may not. Foreign residents in ROK, however, may use such interbank networks at ATMs in ROK through ATM cards procured in foreign countries. Foreigner can open an account in a local bank and get a local ATM Card if they have a residence card. Shinhan Bank and Woori Bank allow foreigners to open bank accounts without a residence card.

Interbank ATMs are common throughout the country, especially in densely populated urban areas such as Seoul.

== See also ==
- List of banks in South Korea
- Economy of South Korea
