= Federal Rules of Criminal Procedure =

Governance of federal criminal procedure in the United States

The Federal Rules of Criminal Procedure are the procedural rules that govern how federal criminal prosecutions are conducted in United States district courts and the general trial courts of the U.S. government. They are the companion to the Federal Rules of Civil Procedure. The admissibility and use of evidence in criminal proceedings (as well as civil) are governed by the separate Federal Rules of Evidence.

== Drafting and enactment ==
The rules are promulgated by the Supreme Court of the United States, pursuant to its statutory authority under the Rules Enabling Act. The Supreme Court must transmit a copy of its rules to the United States Congress no later than May 1 of the year in which they are to go into effect, and the new rule can then become effective no earlier than December 1 of that year.

Congress retains the power to reject the Court's proposed rules or amendments, to modify them, or to enact rules or amendments itself. Congress has rarely rejected the Court's proposed amendments, though it has frequently passed its own.

The rules are initially drafted by an Advisory Committee of the Judicial Conference of the United States, which consists of appointed judges, U.S. Department of Justice representatives, practicing lawyers, and legal scholars. After public comment, the draft rules are submitted to the Standing Committee on Rules of Practice and Procedure, which in turn submits them to the Judicial Conference, which finally recommends them to the Supreme Court for approval. The explanatory notes of the drafting Advisory Committee are published with the final adopted rules, and are frequently used as an authority on their interpretation.

== History ==
For the first 150 years of the federal judiciary, there was no uniform federal criminal procedure. The Judiciary Act of 1789 directed federal courts to apply the law of the state in which the court sat regarding jury selection and the process for arrests, bail, and preliminary hearings. The Act did not address procedure in other areas, and though subsequent legislation filled in some gaps, Congress never enacted a generally applicable statutory command to observe state criminal procedure, as it had regarding civil procedure under the Conformity Act. Congress also enacted some specific federal rules, beginning in 1790 with provisions included in the first U.S. federal criminal statutes.

The result was an incomplete patchwork of state and federal law that the Supreme Court and the lower federal courts did little to fill in, despite seeming authorization under the Judiciary Act to do so. Early Supreme Court cases also fully endorsed congressional authority to enact rules of procedure, and declined the opportunity to directly claim such authority for the courts under Article III of the United States Constitution. A few federal court decisions nonetheless established what amounted to particular federal common law rules of criminal procedure, which added to the lack of conformity in the federal system.

In 1933, Congress authorized the Supreme Court to prescribe rules of criminal appellate procedure, which included any proceeding after the entry of a verdict or plea. Satisfaction with the first Federal Rules of Civil Procedure, enacted in 1938, led to support for uniform criminal rules, and authority to establish rules of general criminal procedure was given to the Supreme Court in 1940, with the Sumners Courts Act. The first Federal Rules of Criminal Procedure were subsequently adopted by order of the Court on December 26, 1944, for procedures up to verdict, and on February 8, 1946, for procedures after verdict, thus completing the project. Justices Black and Frankfurter dissented. The full set, denominated the Federal Rules of Criminal Procedure, then took effect on March 21, 1946.

Under the Sumners Courts Act, the U.S. Attorney General was given the responsibility of transmitting amendments of the rules to Congress, though this was amended in 1949 to give that duty to the Chief Justice. The turn-around period for the rules becoming effective was originally one full congressional session. This was amended in 1950 to impose the May 1 deadline, but with a 90-day delay in effectiveness. In 1988, authorization for the Rules was incorporated under the Rules Enabling Act, and codified at 28 U.S.C. §§ 2072, 2074.

== See also ==
- Rule 41

== Bibliography ==
- Beale, Sara Sun (1984). "Reconsidering Supervisory Power in Criminal Cases: Constitutional and Statutory Limits on the Authority of the Federal Courts". Columbia Law Review. 84 (6): 1433–1522. doi:10.2307/1122471. JSTOR 1122471.
- VanDercreek, William; Moore, James (1981). Federal procedure: a problem-solving textual analysis of federal judicial and administrative procedure.
