= Howard Brodie (sketch artist) =

American artist (1915–2010)

- Born: November 18, 1915; Oakland, California, United States
- Died: September 19, 2010 (aged 94)
- Education: California School of Fine Arts
- Occupation: Sketch artist
- Employers: San Francisco Chronicle; US Army

Howard Brodie (November 18, 1915 – September 19, 2010) was an American sketch artist best known for his World War II, Korean and Vietnam combat and courtroom sketches. He worked as a staff artist for Life, Yank Magazine, Collier's, Associated Press and CBS News.

== Pre-war career ==
Brodie was born in Oakland, California, United States, on November 18, 1915. He briefly attended California School of Fine Arts, San Francisco. When World War II started, Howard Brodie was a sports artist for the San Francisco Chronicle. Brodie also enjoyed success as an illustrator of college football program covers.

== Combat sketches ==
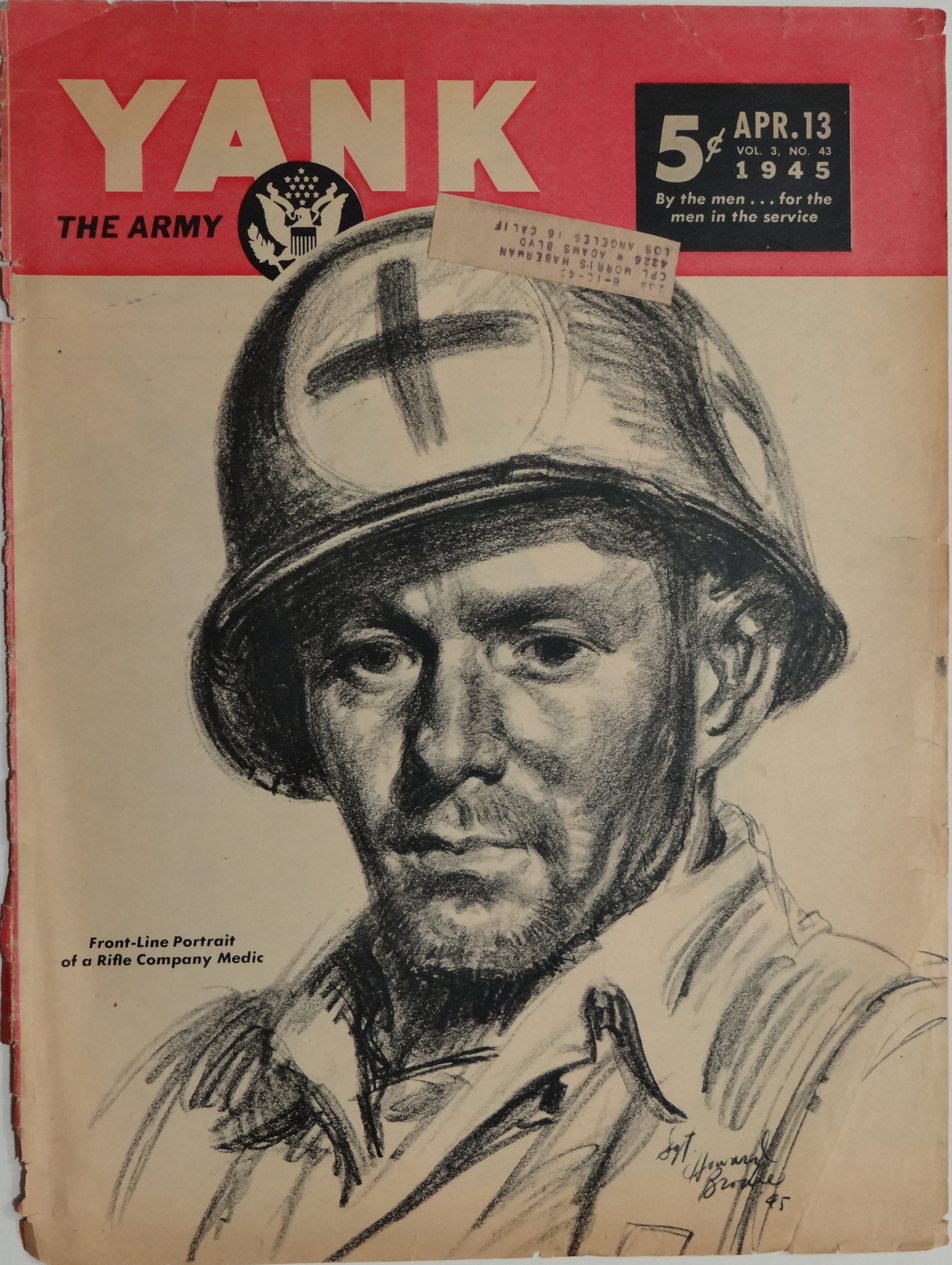
Brodie's 1945 sketch of a Rifle Company Medic, "Portrait of a Medic"

With entry of the United States into World War II, Brodie enlisted in the Army. He became one of Yank magazine's best-known artists during the war. He sketched everything from Guadalcanal to the Battle of the Bulge (particularly the Malmedy massacre), and had an uncanny ability to capture the emotions of his subjects and record a scene with great attention to detail.

He put himself in combat situations many times and, while he never carried a weapon, worked as a medic when needed. He received the Bronze Star for valor.

About his war experiences and the differences he felt between WW2 correspondents and correspondents in the Vietnam war, Howard Brodie told the audience during a panel discussion given on the 18 September 1995 at the American University's School of Communication, the following anecdote. During the Vietnam War, as he was returning to the press camp at the rear of the front, he started a conversation with another correspondent to which he protested against American troops executing prisoners. The correspondent showed him photographs of Viet-Cong prisoners being shot in the neck and when Brodie protested again, he was told “all wars have had their brutality”. Brodie responded “the hell they have because in WW2 there were isolated cases but not like this”. Brodie felt that in WW2 “there was much more of a feel of compassion among war correspondents”.

== Courtroom sketches ==
After the war Brodie became a courtroom artist and recorded many famous trials, including those of the Chicago Seven, Charles Manson and General Westmoreland, the Ruby trial and Senate Civil Rights Debates. He was also a CBS TV Artist-Correspondent during which time he produced illustrations of U.S. Senator Robert Kennedy's assassin Sirhan Sirhan, and Supreme Court Justice Thurgood Marshall. Brodie never fully severed his ties to the military and was a combat artist in Korea, French Indochina, and Vietnam. His works can be found in the Library of Congress.

== Commissioned works in popular movies ==
His first-hand experience of conflicts led to him working for several war movies such as Lewis Milestone's 1959 Pork Chop Hill, John Wayne's 1968 Green Berets, and Francis Ford Coppola's Apocalypse Now.

== Famous works ==
Two of Brodie's most famous works are "Portrait of a Medic", which appeared on the cover of Yank Magazine, and "Compassion". Another sketch, which depicted an exhausted G.I. dropping his rifle as World War II ended, appeared on the cover of Yank’s Continental Edition on August 19, 1945. Brodie's works are collected in Drawing Fire: A Combat Artist at War Pacific Europe Korea Indochina Vietnam and can also be seen in the permanent collections of the Library of Congress, the New Britain Museum of American Art, and the San Francisco Olympic Club..

As The New York Times has stated, "His sketch of the black militant Bobby Seale gagged and strapped to his chair became the image that epitomized the trial of the Chicago Seven, the leaders of protests at the 1968 Democratic National Convention."
