= Rule 41 =

Rule 41, titled Search and Seizure, is a rule in the Federal Rules of Criminal Procedure.

== Overview ==
In 2016 an amendment allowed judges to issue warrants allowing the FBI and other federal law enforcement agencies to use remote access tools to access (hack) computers outside the jurisdiction in which the warrant was granted.

The amendment to the subdivision (b) reads as follows:

(6) a magistrate judge with authority in any district where activities related to a crime may have occurred has authority to issue a warrant to use remote access to search electronic storage media and to seize or copy electronically stored information located within or outside that district if:

(A) the district where the media or information is located has been concealed through technological means; or
(B) in an investigation of a violation of 18 U.S.C. § 1030(a)(5), the media are protected computers that have been damaged without authorization and are located in five or more districts

== See also ==
- Federal Rules of Criminal Procedure
