= David Schwartz (disambiguation) =

David Schwartz is an American composer.

David Schwartz may also refer to:

- Dave Schwartz (1953–2016), meteorologist
- David Schwartz (comic artist), comic book artist, storyboard artist
- David Schwartz (judge) (1916–1989), judge of the United States Court of Claims
- David Schwartz (lawyer) (born 1967), American attorney
- David C. Schwartz (1939–2022), American politician in the New Jersey General Assembly
- David J. Schwartz (motivational writer) (1927–1987), American motivational writer and coach
- David J. Schwartz (science fiction writer) (born 1970), American science fiction and fantasy writer

== See also ==
- David Schwarz (disambiguation)
- David Schwartzman (disambiguation)
