= Scandal Sheet =

Scandal Sheet may refer to:

- Scandal sheet or tabloid journalism, a popular style of largely sensationalist journalism
- Scandal Sheet (1931 film), an American crime film starring George Bancroft
- Scandal Sheet (1939 film), an American crime film
- Scandal Sheet (1952 film), an American black-and-white film by Phil Karlson
- Scandal Sheet (1985 film), an American TV film starring Burt Lancaster

== See also ==
- Scandal Street (disambiguation)
- Scandal (disambiguation)
