= Scandal Street =

Scandal Street may refer to:

- Scandal Street (1938 film), an American drama film
- Scandal Street (1925 film), an American silent drama film

== See also ==
- Scandal Sheet (disambiguation)
- Scandal (disambiguation)
