= Gene Freidman =

New York City taxi cab magnate (1970–2021)

Evgeny Alender Freidman (Russian: Евгений Алендер Фридман;), known as Gene Freidman, (November 29, 1970 – October 24, 2021) was an American businessman and attorney who once owned a large taxi fleet in New York City, Taxi Club Management, Inc. He was dubbed the "Taxi King" or "Kingpin." He was a convicted felon and was disbarred.

== Early life and education ==
Freidman was born on November 29, 1970, into a Jewish family in Leningrad (now Saint Petersburg). He was an only child. He and his family immigrated to the United States as refugees in 1976, settling in Jackson Heights, Queens. His father, Naum, was a thermonuclear engineer in Russia, but in New York, he became a cabdriver and eventually ran a garage with a fleet of taxis. He attended public schools in Queens, then The Bronx High School of Science, and graduated with a B.S. degree from Skidmore College in 1992, after being suspended for one semester for overdue parking tickets. While in his senior year at Skidmore, Freidman intervened when two female students were being harassed at a bar and was hit in the face with a bottle. Surgeons used 400 stitches and barely saved his left eye.

He received his J.D. from the Benjamin N. Cardozo School of Law of Yeshiva University in New York City and was admitted to practice law, although he was disbarred in 2017 after pleading guilty to tax fraud. After college, he worked as a lawyer for a production company in Los Angeles. He then returned to the Soviet Union to represent a private investor.

== Career ==
In 1996, after his father had a heart attack, Friedman took over his father's taxi company, Taxi Club Management Inc., which had 60 Yellow cabs. He expanded it to 900 by 2015. He led the company from revenues of $2.5 million in 1996 to $120 million in 2008.

In 2008, Freidman was listed on Crain's New York Business list of "40 Under 40". Taxi Club Management permanently closed in 2018.

Freidman managed the taxi fleet of Michael Cohen after Simon Garber purchased the management of most of Cohen's large fleet. Cohen arranged an apartment for Friedman in Trump Tower.

Friedman would artificially bid up prices of taxi medallions at auctions, then use the inflated prices as a basis for loans from banks, leading to an economic bubble.

=== Legal issues ===
In 2013, Freidman reached a settlement with the New York State Attorney General's office and the Taxi and Limousine Commission over excessive charges to taxi drivers working for three of Freidman's companies. Freidman agreed to pay $750,000 in restitution to drivers and $500,000 in fines. Attorney General of New York Eric Schneiderman sued Freidman in April 2015 for failing to abide by the terms of the 2013 settlement and for further violations. The suit was settled in April 2016 with Freidman required to pay over $250,000 in fines, damages, and restitution.

In July 2016, companies that owned approximately 90 of Friedman's nearly 900 taxi medallions, filed Chapter 11 bankruptcy in an attempt to protect those medallions from foreclosure action by lenders. In December 2016, he agreed to surrender 46 of his medallions to settle obligations to Citibank. In September 2016, Freidman was evicted from his longtime headquarters after falling $170,000 behind on his rent. In April 2017, the Taxi and Limousine Commission refused to renew more than 800 of Freidman's licenses which had expired. At that time, Freidman still owned about 150 taxi medallions.

In June 2017, Freidman along with Taxi Club Management's CFO Andreea Dumitru were indicted with four counts of criminal tax fraud in the first degree and one count of grand larceny in the first degree. The indictments alleged that Freidman's company stole $5 million by never remitting the state the 50-cent surcharge, known as the Metropolitan Transportation Authority tax, that the company collected. On May 22, 2018, Freidman pleaded guilty to one count of criminal tax fraud in the second degree. As part of his plea deal, Freidman was required to pay restitution of $1 million to the New York State Department of Taxation and Finance. Freidman’s sentence was suspended to allow him to complete his restitution payments. If he satisfied the terms of the agreement, he was to be sentenced to 5 years’ probation.

In December 2017, Freidman served a 28-day sentence in Cook County Jail in Chicago for "indirect criminal contempt of court".

==== Disbarment ====
On July 13, 2017, Freidman was suspended from practicing law then, on May 1, 2018; he was barred from practicing law as an attorney in New York, for having failed to respond to notices or appear for investigation related to his suspension.

==== Sexual harassment lawsuit ====
In June 2018, Freidman lost a lawsuit to his former assistant whom he was found to have repeatedly sexually harassed. A New York court ordered him to pay $1.3 million in damages.

== Politics ==
Freidman raised more than $50,000 for Mayor Bill de Blasio's 2013 campaign.

== Personal life ==
In 2015, before his financial troubles, Freidman owned a 4,000-square-foot townhouse off Park Avenue in Manhattan, an estate in Bridgehampton, New York, two villas in Saint-Jean-Cap-Ferrat on the French Riviera, and a $400,000 Ferrari. He was a part owner of Arthur until the late 2000s, a chain that sold high-end pajamas and beach wear with whimsical French patterns.

On October 24, 2021, Freidman died at the age of 50 in a Manhattan hospital, apparently from complications of a heart attack.
