= Scandale (disambiguation) =

Scandale is a town and commune, in Calabria, southern Italy, formerly the see of the Diocese of San Leone.

Scandale may also refer to :

== Arts and entertainment ==
=== Film ===
- Scandale (film), 1982 Quebec comedy film
- Le Scandale (1934 film), France film
- The French title of the 2019 American documentary film Bombshell.

=== Music ===
- Scandale, classical album by Alice Sara Ott and Francesco Tristano (2014)
- Scandale Records, label of Sexy Sushi and other bands

== Places ==
- Scandale Beck, a hill in Britain's Lake District National Park
- Scandale Fell, High Pike (Scandale), Lake District, England, UK
- Scandale Pass, a pass in Britain's Lake District

== Other uses ==
- Scandale (company), a French clothing designer

== See also ==
- Scandalo (disambiguation)
- Scandal (disambiguation)
