= Klasfeld =

Klasfeld is a surname. Notable people with the surname include:

- Adam Klasfeld, American journalist
- Marc Klasfeld, American music video director
