= Skandalon =

Skandalon (from the Greek σκανδαλον) may refer to:

- Stumbling block, in the Bible, a behavior or attitude that leads another to sin
- Scandal, an action that damages someone's reputation
- a 1970 work by René Kalisky

== See also ==
- Scandal (disambiguation)
