= Klarsfeld =

Klarsfeld is a surname. Notable people with the surname include:

- Beate Klarsfeld (born 1939), French-German journalist
- Serge Klarsfeld (born 1935), French activist and Nazi hunter

== See also ==
- Linda Klarfeld (born 1978), Australian sculptor
- Adam Klasfeld, American journalist
- Marc Klasfeld, American music video director
