= The New School for Social Research =

Private research university in New York City

Coordinates: 40°44′8.08″N 73°59′49.08″W

- Type: Private
- Established: 1919; 107 years ago
- Parent institution: The New School
- Accreditation: NYSED; MSCHE
- Dean: Christoph Cox
- Faculty: 75
- Students: 789
- Location: New York City, US
- Campus: Urban
- Colors: White; black; Parsons Red
- Mascot: Gnarls the Narwhal
- Website: newschool.edu/nssr

The New School for Social Research (NSSR), previously known as The University in Exile and The New School University, is a graduate-level educational division of The New School in New York City, United States. NSSR enrolls more than 1,000 students from the United States, as well as students from other countries.

== History ==
=== Founding the New School for Social Research (1919–1933) ===
The New School for Social Research was founded in 1919 by a group of progressive intellectuals (mostly from Columbia University and The New Republic) who had grown dissatisfied with the growing bureaucracy and fragmentation of higher education in the United States. These included, among others, Charles Beard, John Dewey, James Harvey Robinson, and Thorstein Veblen. In its earliest manifestation, the New School was an adult education institution that gave night lectures to fee-paying students. There were no admissions requirements and the New School did not confer degrees.

The first set of lectures included courses by economists Thorstein Veblen, Wesley Clair Mitchell, and Harold Laski, though these economists did not remain on the faculty long. In the ensuing decade, the New School hosted courses by a diverse array of economists, including Leo Wolman, a labor statistician with the Amalgamated Clothing Workers of America, and Frederick Macaulay, who later formalized the financial concept bond duration. During this period, John Maynard Keynes and Benjamin Graham also gave multiple guest lectures at The New School. One lasting presence at the New School was the economist-turned-administrator Alvin Saunders Johnson, who was the school's first president.

=== University in Exile and Graduate Faculty of Political and Social Science (1933–1960) ===
In response to the Nazi Germany's 1933 Civil Service Restoration Act, an act that dismissed over 1,200 Jewish or radical academics from German state-run institutions, Alvin Johnson raised $120,000 from Hiram Halle to create a "University in Exile" at The New School consisting of the dismissed European academics. Financial contributions were also obtained from the Rockefeller Foundation. The initial group included Emil Lederer, Frieda Wunderlich, Hans Staudinger, Eduard Heimann, Karl Brandt, Hans Simons and Gerhard Colm. A second wave of academics fleeing Europe after France fell to the Nazis in 1939 included Adolph Lowe, Jacob Marschak, Abba Lerner, Franco Modigliani, Hans Neisser, and Emil J. Gumbel.

Notable scholars associated with the University in Exile include psychologists Erich Fromm and Max Wertheimer, political philosophers Hannah Arendt and Leo Strauss, social psychologist Everett Dean Martin, philosophers Aron Gurwitsch, Hans Jonas, and Reiner Schürmann, sociologists Alfred Schutz, Peter L. Berger, and Arthur Vidich, economists Adolph Lowe and Robert Heilbroner, and historians Charles Tilly and Louise Tilly.

In 1934, the émigré faculty received a provisional charter from the State of New York to grant graduate degrees. With the charter, the faculty changed their name from the University in Exile to the Graduate Faculty of Political and Social Science. The faculty taught night classes in English to New Yorkers. In 1935, there were 150 registered graduate students; in 1940, this had grown to 520 students. Prior to 1960, the Graduate Faculty was not split into academic departments. Many faculty had interests that crossed disciplinary boundaries, from economics into sociology or philosophy. Accordingly, students (like Franco Modigliani) received M.Sc.'s and D.Sc.'s in the Social Sciences rather than in Economics, Psychology, or Sociology.

In 1964, John R. Everett became the President of the New School for Social Research, which position he held until he retired in 1982. Harry Gideonse was Chancellor of the New School for Social Research from 1966 until 1975, when he retired.

== Department of Economics ==
Department of Economics at The New School for Social Research
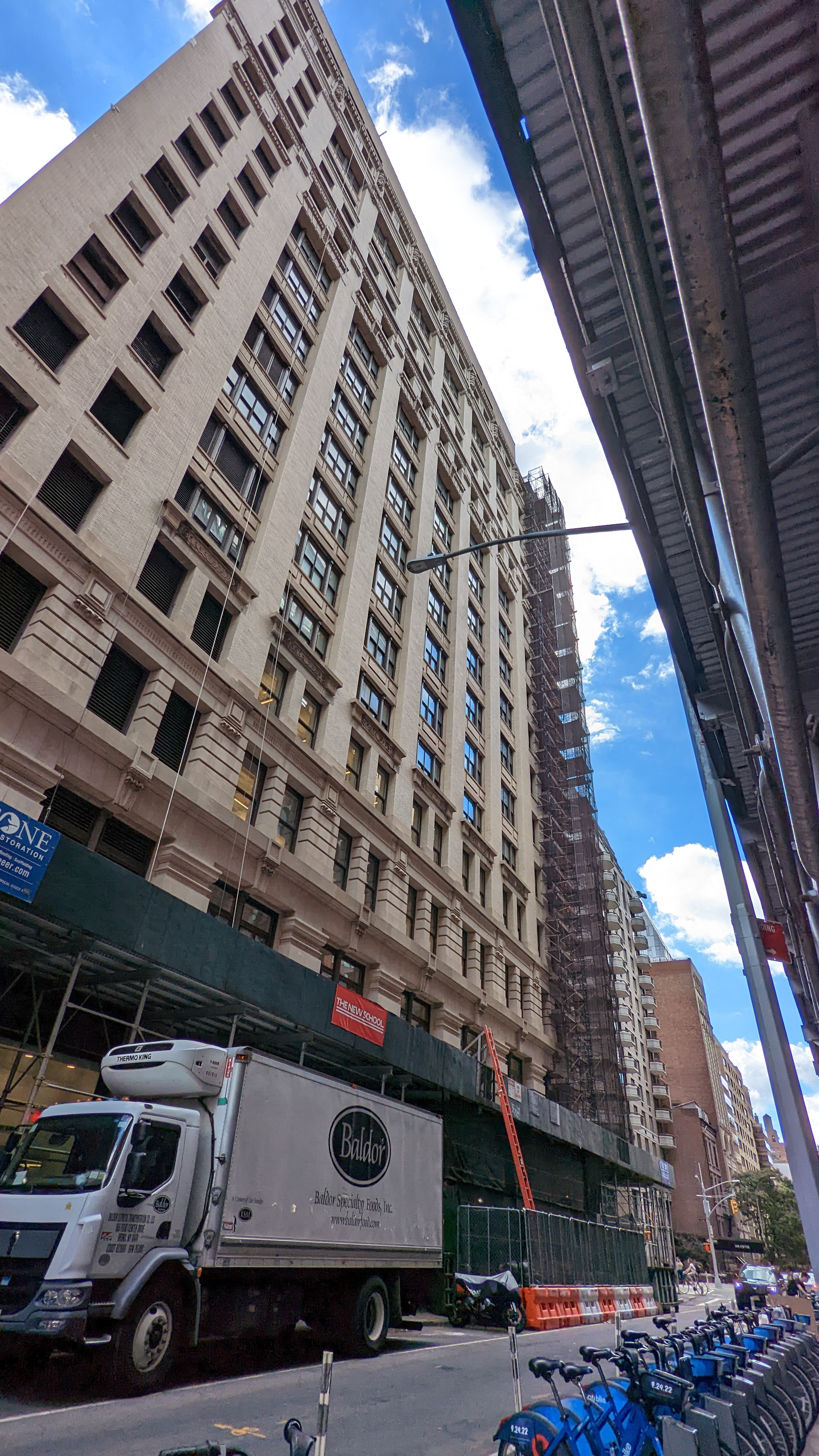
- 6 E 16th St, NYC - The home of the New School for Social Research
- Type: Private Not-for-Profit
- Established: 1919 (The New School) 1933 (The University in Exile) 1960 (Economics Department)
- Location: New York City
- Campus: Urban
- Website: www.newschool.edu/nssr/economics/

The Department of Economics is an academic department within The New School for Social Research. The faculty has contributed to economic theories such as, Post-Keynesian, Marxian, Institutional, Structuralist, and Political economics.

=== History of the Department of Economics (1960–present) ===
From 1958 to 1963, The New School suffered from another budgetary crisis. The school was running a deficit that it could not repay. Economists and administrators Alvin Johnson and Hans Staudinger led a "Save the School" fundraising campaign that narrowly saved the school from bankruptcy. In order to make the school more conventional and fundable, the administration reorganized the Graduate Faculty into five departments: Economics, Psychology, Sociology, Philosophy, and Political Science. This reorganization began in the late 1950s, but was only solidified in the 1960 course catalogs.

As the German émigrés retired, the Economics department began to appoint new economists, beginning with David Schwartzman, an industrial organization economist who had studied with Milton Friedman and George Stigler, and Thomas Vietorisz, a specialist in the economics of planning.

In 1968, Robert Heilbroner (Ph.D., 1963) was appointed assistant Professor of Economics. Heilbroner had, while a graduate student at The New School, published The Worldly Philosophers: The Lives, Times and Great Ideas of the Great Economic Thinkers. The Worldly Philosophers was inspired by a class on Adam Smith taught by Heilbroner's teacher, Adolph Lowe. In the book, Heilbroner discusses the evolution of economic thought using of the lives and times of the great economists. This focus on the history of economic thought permeated Heilbroner's teaching and writing.

In 1969 and 1970, Edward Nell and Stephen Hymer were appointed to the faculty. Nell's work focused on economic methodology and Post-Keynesian Economics while Hymer was a Marxian economist whose Ph.D. supervisor was Charles Kindleberger.

Together, the faculty launched a graduate program in Political Economy in 1971. In the May 1971 press release, Heilbroner emphasized that the goal of the faculty was to give students training in a variety of traditions of economic analysis. In 1972 and 1973, the faculty hired Anwar Shaikh and David Gordon, two young and radical economists with divergent approaches to economics: Shaikh initially focused on international trade and Marxian economic theory while Gordon focused on labor research and econometric models. In 1974, Heidi Hartmann joined the faculty to develop a gender and economics program. In 1975, Paul Sweezy taught a course on Karl Marx.

In the late 1970s, Gita Sen, Ross Thomson, and Willi Semmler joined the faculty. In 1982, John Eatwell joined the Department on a part-time arrangement. During the 1980s and 1990s, the faculty had many shorter-term appointments and visitors, including Nancy Folbre, Heinz Kurz, Rhonda Williams, Alice Amsden, and Thomas Palley.

In the 1990s, the economics department hired a number of faculty who would remain for decades: William Milberg, Lance Taylor, and Duncan Foley. In 1995, David Gordon, John Eatwell, and Bill Janeway together founded the Center for Economic Policy Analysis (CEPA), though Gordon died soon after founding CEPA.

== Recent School History ==
From its founding in 1919 until 1995, the university was officially called The New School for Social Research, though already in the 1930s, "for Social Research" receded in official publications, which elevated the name "The New School," the name by which the university was colloquially known. In 1995, the university dropped the name The New School for Social Research and rebranded itself New School University. The various colleges that composed the university were regrouped under various names such as College of Performing Arts (taking on the existing music, jazz, and drama schools), Eugene Lang College The New School for Liberal Arts, Parsons School of Design and The New School for Public Engagement (taking on Milano School of International Affairs, Management, and Urban Policy, plus media studies, language studies and other programs). In 2005, the university reverted to the name "The New School" and the Graduate Faculty renamed itself "The New School for Social Research," reclaiming the original name of the university.

In 2004, the student union founded The New School Economic Review, a student run peer-reviewed journal.
