= Misfire: Inside the Downfall of the NRA =

2021 book by Tim Mak

- Author: Tim Mak
- Subject: National Rifle Association of America
- Published: Nov 2, 2021
- Publisher: E. P. Dutton
- ISBN: 978-1-5247-4645-2

Misfire: Inside the Downfall of the NRA is a nonfiction book by NPR journalist Tim Mak, released Nov 2, 2021. It covers the National Rifle Association of America (NRA) during the leadership of Wayne LaPierre. The author began writing about the NRA after observing the actions of the Russian agent Maria Butina.

== Critical reception ==
Reviews have been positive. The New Republic called the book a "revealing and lively" look at a "gaudy saga." The Guardian says the book is a "bullseye" if "depressing" in some parts.
