= Scandalous =

Scandalous may refer to:

- Scandal, scandalous being the adjectival form for scandal

== Songs ==
- "Scandalous" (Mis-Teeq song), a 2003 song by Mis-Teeq
- "Scandalous!", a Prince song which was the love theme to the 1989 film Batman
- "Scandalous", a song by Cuban Link featuring Don Omar from the album Chain Reaction, 2005
- "Scandalous", a song by Gryffin from the album Alive, 2022
- "Scandalous", a song by the Click from the album Game Related

== Albums ==
- Scandalous (album), a 1983 music album by British group Imagination
- Scandalous: The All Star Compilation, a 2002 compilation album

== Others ==
- Scandalous (film), a 1984 comedy film starring Robert Hays
- Scandalous: The Life and Trials of Aimee Semple McPherson, a 2012 Broadway musical about Aimee Semple McPherson
- Scandalous (novel), 2010 novel by Martel Maxwell

== See also ==
- Scandal (disambiguation)
- Ms Scandalous (born 1985), British female rap/pop musician
- Scandal'us, Australian band, a Popstars winner
