= Lanny Davis =

American lawyer, author, and lobbyist

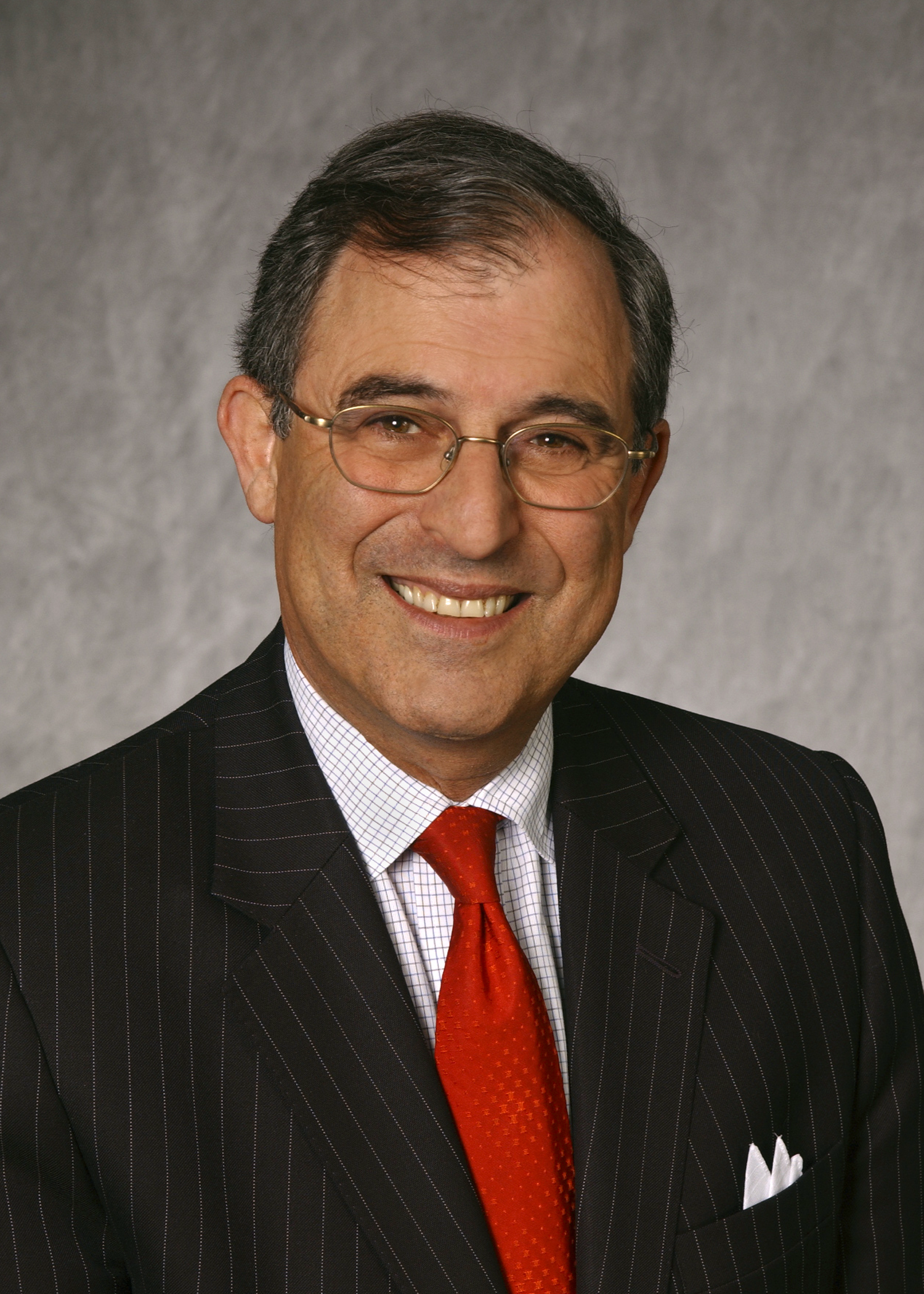
- Davis in 2004
- Born: Lanny Jesse Davis; December 12, 1945 (age 80); Jersey City, New Jersey, U.S.
- Education: Yale University (BA, JD)
- Known for: Former Clinton family advisor, political strategist
- Political party: Democratic
- Spouse(s): Elaine Charney (divorced); Carolyn Atwell
- Children: Seth

Lanny Jesse Davis (born December 12, 1945) is an American political operative, lawyer, consultant, lobbyist, author, and television commentator. He is the co-founder and partner of the law firm of Davis Goldberg & Galper PLLC, and co-founder and partner of the public relations firm Trident DMG.

In July 2018, Davis was hired by Michael Cohen, a former personal attorney to Donald Trump, to represent Cohen in his testimony before Congress regarding President Donald Trump. Davis later represented Cohen when he pleaded guilty to tax fraud, bank fraud, and violation of campaign finance laws on August 21, 2018.

Davis's clients have included Harvey Weinstein, Porton Group, National Women's History Museum, National Black Chamber of Commerce, eHealth, Sofitel Hotels, Trent Lott, Gene Upshaw, Dan Snyder, Martha Stewart, Shannon Sharpe, and the Office of the President at Penn State University. Davis has been a regular television commentator and political and legal analyst for MSNBC, CNN, CNBC and network television news programs. He wrote a column called "Purple Nation," and his writing appeared in publications including Fox News, The Hill, The Huffington Post, and The Daily Caller.

== Background ==
Davis grew up in Jersey City, New Jersey, in a Jewish family. His father, Mort, was a dentist in Jersey City and his mother worked as the office manager of his father's dental office. He attended Newark Academy in Newark, graduating in 1962. As an undergraduate at Yale, he was a member of the Delta Kappa Epsilon fraternity. According to an item in U.S. News & World Report, as part of his initiation into the fraternity, Davis underwent hazing by, among others, the future President of the United States George W. Bush. He also served as chairman of the campus newspaper, the Yale Daily News. Davis went on to receive his J.D. degree from Yale Law School in 1970. It was there that he first met Hillary Clinton. He also won the Thurman Arnold Moot Court prize at Yale and contributed to the Yale Law Journal.

Davis has four children, and lives in Potomac, Maryland, with his second wife, Carolyn Atwell-Davis, who was the legislative affairs director for the National Center for Missing and Exploited Children. One of his sons, Seth, was a columnist for Sports Illustrated magazine and is a college basketball commentator for CBS.

== Career ==
=== Politics ===
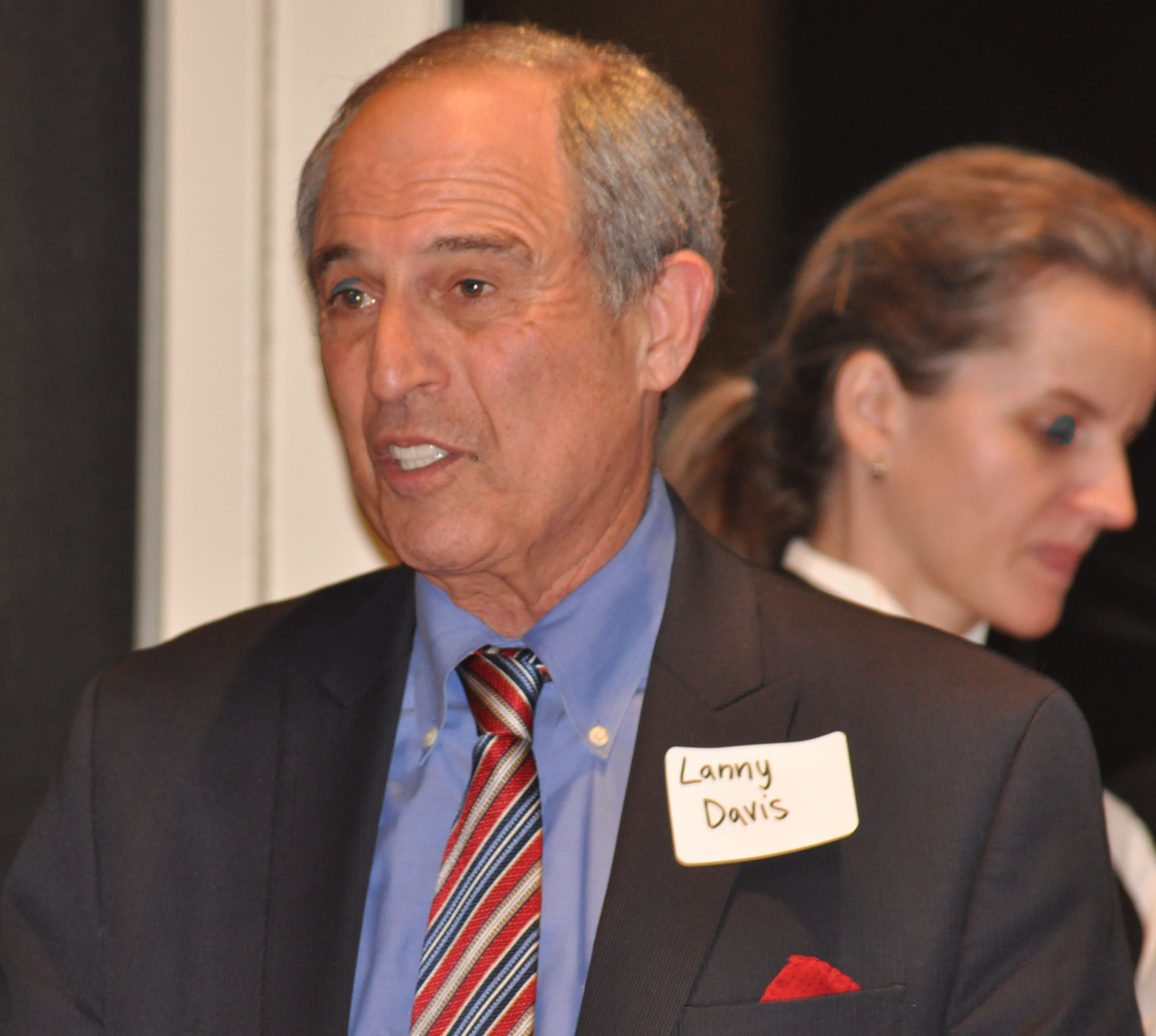
Lanny Davis, 2014

Davis was the treasurer for Joe Lieberman's Reuniting Our Country PAC.

=== Attorney ===
After leaving the White House, Davis returned to Patton Boggs. There he worked as a lobbyist for the nation of Pakistan prior to the attacks of September 11, 2001. In 2003, Davis became a partner in the Washington, D.C. office of the law firm Orrick, Herrington & Sutcliffe. There, he provided counseling to corporations and government contractors on crisis management. He left the firm in late 2009 to join McDermott Will & Emery, but separated from the firm seven months later to open his own company, Lanny J. Davis & Associates.

He was a senior advisor and spokesman for the Israel Project. In 2009, he did "damage control for hawkish Democratic congresswoman Jane Harman over the American Israel Public Affairs Committee leak story".

In January 2012 Davis launched a new public affairs firm, Purple Nation Solutions. Davis also joined the Philadelphia-based law firm of Dilworth Paxson L.L.P. in March 2012, practicing out of the firm's Washington office and focusing on "legal crisis management."

In October 2012 Davis was the subject of a CBS Sunday Morning segment where he took investigative journalist Sharyl Attkisson behind the scenes into the world of lobbying, focusing on his work for eHealthInsurance. In October 2013 Davis began acting as outside legal counsel to the Washington Redskins to help defend the organization's nickname. He also represented Kathleen Kane and Bo Dietl in his solo practice.

In 2016, at the age of 70, Davis co-founded the law firm of Davis Goldberg & Galper with partners Adam Goldberg and Joshua Galper, stating that he needed to continue supporting his family but was too busy to handle his workload by himself. In addition to co-founding Davis Goldberg & Galper, Davis started a new PR firm, called TridentDMG, in partnership with Eleanor McManus, who had worked with Davis since 2010 and previously served as a senior producer for CNN's Larry King Live.

==== Michael Cohen ====
Davis on MSNBC in 2018

In July 2018, Davis was hired by Michael Cohen, a former personal attorney to Donald Trump, to represent him as co-counsel in the Stormy Daniels–Donald Trump scandal. Davis encouraged Cohen to reveal that he and Trump had discussed a payment surrounding a different affair with model Karen McDougal. Davis later revealed that Cohen had secretly recorded the conversation with Trump, and he released a tape of the conversation to CNN, which played it on the air. On it, Trump and Cohen can be heard discussing how to make a payment for "all of that info regarding our friend David," interpreted as meaning David Pecker, the head of American Media which publishes the National Enquirer.

Davis continued to serve as Cohen's attorney when Cohen came under federal criminal investigation by the United States Attorney for the Southern District of New York, and papers and other materials were seized from Cohen in April 2018 under a subpoena. Davis helped Cohen to negotiate a plea bargain under which he agreed to plead guilty to several charges in return for leniency in sentencing. On August 21, Cohen pleaded guilty to eight charges: five counts of tax evasion, one count of making false statements to a financial institution, one count of willfully causing an unlawful corporate contribution, and one count of making an excessive campaign contribution at the request of a candidate or campaign.

After Cohen's guilty plea and conviction, Davis made several public comments, indicating that Cohen is ready to "tell everything about Donald Trump that he knows", and alluding to Cohen's knowledge which could be used against Trump. He later added that he believed Cohen would agree to testify before Congress, even without immunity. He also rejected the possibility of a presidential pardon from Trump, saying that Cohen would "never accept a pardon from a man that he considers to be both corrupt and a dangerous person in the oval office." However, Davis later contradicted that statement; saying that during the weeks after Cohen's home was raided by the FBI, Cohen "directed his attorney to explore possibilities of a pardon at one point with Trump lawyer Rudy Giuliani as well as other lawyers advising President Trump".

=== Foreign government representation ===
In 2000 Davis lobbied on behalf of Pakistan's government while U.S. President Bill Clinton was in deliberations over whether to visit the country. Those lobbying on behalf of neighboring India, at the time, said such a visit would be legitimizing a terrorist state. In regards to the negotiations Davis stated, "Whatever we might say about this particular government in Pakistan, it has immediately indicated a willingness to negotiate. Nobody has yet explained why India refuses to sit down and negotiate, that's why President Clinton's involvement is so important."

In July 2009 Davis represented the Honduran Business Council and testified publicly before the House Western Hemisphere Subcommittee on its behalf. He criticized the deportation of former President Manuel Zelaya but also supported a reconciliation solution based on principles of the rule of law and due process.

For ten days in December 2010, Davis represented the Washington, D.C. Ivory Coast Embassy and Ambassador and worked closely with the State Department's West African Bureau to facilitate a phone call from President Obama to the defeated president of Ivory Coast to try to persuade him to avoid bloodshed and make a peaceful exit from office. When the defeated Ivory Coast president refused to accept the phone call, Davis resigned. On January 1, 2011, the official spokesman of the U.S. State Department, P. J. Crowley, publicly acknowledged that Davis' role was "helpful".

=== Author and commentator ===
In 1999, Davis wrote a memoir about his work in the White House titled Truth to Tell: Tell It Early, Tell It All, Tell It Yourself: Notes from My White House Education. In 2006, his book Scandal: How "Gotcha" Politics Is Destroying America was published.

In 2008, Davis supported Senator Hillary Clinton in her race for the Democratic nomination for President of the United States, and has appeared on Fox News, CNN, and MSNBC as a surrogate for her. After Clinton conceded, Davis went on to support Barack Obama.

In 2008, Davis questioned the United States' response to the conflict between Russia and Georgia and advised present and future U.S. leaders to consider the point of view of the Russian leaders before unilaterally supporting the government of Georgia in the conflict.

As of 2011, Davis appeared weekly on four radio programs: America's Morning News Radio Show with John McCaslin, WMAL's Mornings on the Mall, Andy Parks Live and KSRO's The Drive with Steve Jaxon. He was a participant in the D.C.'s Funniest Celebrity competition in 2011.

== Opinions and criticism ==
In a 2009 column on Salon.com, Glenn Greenwald criticized Davis for declining to disclose his clients. Greenwald asserted that Davis' clients included dictatorships, opponents of unions, and opponents of health care reform.

According to Salon columnist Justin Elliot, Davis "specializes in lobbying for controversial corporate and foreign clients, particularly those seeking Democratic representation in Washington". He has "built a client list that now includes oligarchic coup supporters in Honduras, a dictator in Equatorial Guinea, for-profit colleges accused of exploiting students, and a company that dominates the manufacture of additives for infant formula", as well as an "Ivory Coast strongman whose claims to that country's presidency have been condemned by the international community and may even set off a civil war". Among his clients are "Ivory Coast leader and flagrant human rights violator Laurent Gbagbo" and "Teodoro Obiang Nguema Mbasogo, the longtime dictator of oil-rich Equatorial Guinea." "Just as Davis was assuring the American press that his client, Gbagbo, opposed violence, Gbagbo's forces were in fact mounting a campaign of organized violence against the opposition". The latter representation has earned him criticism from human rights groups, who claim that he "appears to be engaged in little more than a whitewashing exercise designed to rehabilitate the image of the Obiang regime on the international stage". Similar criticisms were aired in an acerbic exchange with Jon Lovett in The Atlantic.

At the time of the events in the Ivory Coast, State Department spokesman P. J. Crowley issued the following statement: "Lanny did open another alternative channel of communications for us, and was providing the right advice to his client. President Gbagbo has declined to engage our ambassador, Phillip Carter. Absent that avenue, Lanny became another route to encourage President Gbagbo to leave. Unfortunately, every indication is that his client wasn't heeding his advice."

Some of Davis's emails with Hillary Clinton were released to the public as part of the Hillary Clinton email controversy. The flattering emails were characterized by some media members as "cringeworthy."

== See also ==
- List of U.S. political appointments that crossed party lines
