= Disloyal: A Memoir =

2020 memoir by Michael Cohen

- Author: Michael Cohen
- Cover artist: Brian Peterson
- Genre: Nonfiction
- Publisher: Skyhorse Publishing
- Publication date: September 8, 2020
- Publication place: United States
- Pages: 432
- ISBN: 978-1-5107-6469-9 Print
- OCLC: 1197713662
- Website: Skyhorse Publishing

Disloyal: A Memoir; The True Story of the Former Personal Attorney to President Donald J. Trump is a 2020 book by Michael Cohen. In the memoir, Cohen recollects his time working as an attorney for Donald Trump from 2006 to 2018, his felony convictions, and other personal affairs. Throughout the book, Cohen alleges numerous incidents of wrongdoing by Trump.

== Content ==
As his lawyer and "fixer", only Michael Cohen had insight into the shadiest side of Donald Trump. His book describes Trump's racist remarks towards South African President Nelson Mandela, former President Barack Obama, and other minorities, particularly Blacks and Hispanics.

According to Cohen, the book also describes the cruel and humiliating remarks Trump leveled against his own family and members of his staff. As he once testified before Congress, Cohen describes how he personally witnessed Trump engaging in tax fraud by inflating his wealth. Cohen also alleges how he, at Trump's direction, had John Gauger of Liberty University buy IP addresses to rig an online poll for CNBC that listed the greatest CEOs of the past 25 years. Later Cohen described how Trump instructed him to have Gauger rig an online poll that listed the place of early runners in the Presidential race, putting Trump fifth. The book examines Cohen's insights into Trump's views towards women, and Trump's use of payments to women with whom he was alleged to have had extra-marital affairs, an offense for which Cohen was personally tried. Cohen is ruthless and brutal in detailing the behavior he exposes in his former employer.

=== Peaceful transition of power ===
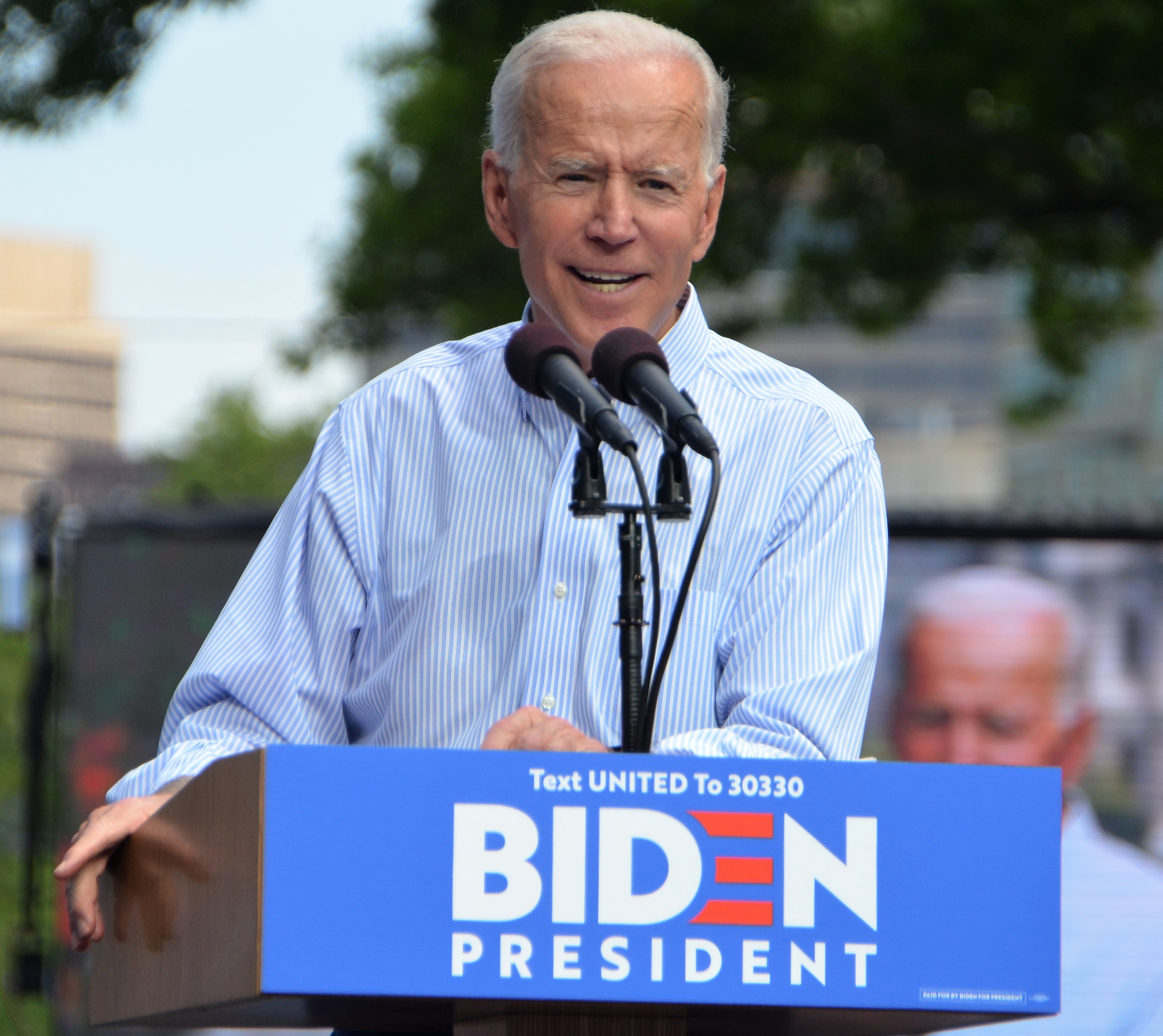
Biden in 2019

One of the book's predictions, stated first in Cohen's February 2019 testimony before the Congressional Oversight Committee, was that if Trump lost the 2020 election to Joe Biden, as he did by seven million votes two months after the book's publication, he would find a way to stay in office even if it required bending the election rules or engaging in what might be potentially illegal actions. As his book noted, Cohen concluded his congressional testimony with the words, "Given my experience working with Mr. Trump, I fear that if he loses the election in 2020, that there will never be a peaceful transition of power." Though the election results may still be in doubt by many of his followers, Trump's consistent attempts to use the courts, Republican governors, and election officials to override election results that after investigation the courts consistently found valid and with no evidence of fraud, support this claim, as did Trump's discussion with Vice-President Mike Pence to consider interfering with the reading of election results to take place in Congress on January 6, 2021.

In the book, Cohen describes what he believed to be Trump's capacity to lie and tell half truths, to exaggerate, to willingly mislead, and to manipulate his followers and the press. Trump is portrayed as a heartless man who looks for the help of conservative Christian leaders while later viciously criticizing them, and who claims he supports the common man yet fails to pay money he owes to small and large businesses. He is described as a charlatan who will do anything to push his agenda and meet his personal and financial goals, while putting his family, staff, and the country second to his own agenda.

Cohen also makes the following claims regarding Trump in Disloyal:

- Trump was lying when he claimed in 2011 that he had private investigators sent to Hawaii to investigate Obama's birth certificate.
- Trump was being serious when he expressed desire to serve more than two terms as president. (Note: This is not constitutionally possible per the Twenty-second Amendment to the United States Constitution. This was on the basis of his impeachment.)
- Trump has made racist remarks in Cohen's presence.
  - Trump asked Cohen if he could "name a country run by a black person that isn't a shithole".
  - Trump said he did not expect African Americans and Latinos to vote for him because "they were too stupid".
- Trump once made a sexually provocative comment about Cohen's daughter, who was 15 years old at the time.
- Trump admires Russian President Vladimir Putin for what he believes to be his immense wealth and for his ability to "take over an entire nation and run it as if it were his personal company."
- Cohen contends that Trump's victory in 2016 was primarily a result of his use of the press, which included televised coverage of his rallies, tweets, press conferences, interviews, and other forms of coverage which cost Trump nothing. This included both the conservative, moderate, and right winged press and utilized radio, tabloid newspapers, mainstream newspapers, the Internet and Facebook.
- Cohen characterizes Trump as a cheater, a liar, a fraud, an intimidator, a racist, a sexual predator, a con artist and a white supremacist for whom "anyone who was not part of the ruling class of the earth was like an ant ".
- Cohen contends that Trump's collusion with Russia was "really a confluence of shared interests in harming Hillary Clinton in any way possible, up to and including interfering in the American election, a subject that caused Trump exactly zero unease."
- Although it is rarely referenced, Cohen claims he may have overheard Trump and Donald Trump Jr. confirm a critical meeting set up by Rob Goldstone, who had emailed Trump Jr. that Russia was releasing sensitive information on Hillary Clinton prior to the 2016 election. Trump Jr. had sent an email back to Goldstone requesting the meeting, in effect, inviting Russian interference in the 2016 election. The meeting took place on June 9, 2016, when Trump Jr., and Paul Manafort, met with Rob Goldstone, a British tabloid journalist and several Russians including Natalia Vesselnitskaya, a Kremlin-connected lawyer.
- Trump has a history of verbally abusing his son, Donald Trump Jr., which Cohen claims is not unlike that of Trump's relationship with his late father Fred Trump.

== Critical reviews ==
Lloyd Green writing in The Irish Times gave the book a positive review among a number of reviews that were mixed. Green noted "it's easy to distrust Cohen...But that doesn't make the book any less interesting. For all its black-hearted opportunism and self-aggrandizement, it delivers a readable and bile-filled take on Trump and his minions". Green considers the book's epilogue its most significant contribution to the Cohen saga. The section describes the efforts of William Barr to prevent the release of Disloyal, even if, in the opinion of Cohen and Green, it required destroying Cohen's rights to free speech, and pulling strings to have him remain in prison.

Alex Shepherd of the New Republic gives a somewhat mixed review but notes that "Cohen's links with Trump are indeed deeper and more intimate than those of other tell-all writers ... A great many skeletons are excavated ... Disloyal is... a story of Cohen's gradual awakening to Trump's lawlessness and selfishness and the threat he posed to the country ... Disloyal is as unsavory a book as Michael Cohen is a character." In a conflict expressed by several other reviewers, Shepherd warns of Cohen's limited credibility for his "lying, cheating, and covering up" for the President, but still believes the book affords a unique insight into the real Trump as only an insider like Cohen, a person equally blemished by greed and a thirst for power, could provide.

Carlos Lozada of the Washington Post, pans the book, calling it "A revolting, contradictory, redundant and transparently faux-penitent memoir" and notes that "While he does proffer the eye-popping details and anecdotes required in any Trump tell-all, Cohen reveals little about Trump that is not already widely understood." Lozada lists a series of books that each describe aspects of Trump's life with greater detail and insight than Cohen's book.

Luke Harding of The Guardian gives a positive review describing the book as an "exhilarating and lurid story – part survivor's memoir, part revenge tragedy. His verdict on the president is brutal." Harding stresses Cohen's verdict on Trump "is, for the most part, convincing". Harding also notes "There are gossipy sketches of the president's family and flatterers ... illuminating on the theme of collusion with Russia ...". Cohen's part in potential Russian collusion revolved around his role negotiating a Trump Tower in Moscow while Trump was simultaneously denying any financial dealings with Russia. Harding notes that "Cohen is humbly repentant and ashamed" for his tax crimes and thuggish behavior while in Trump's employ, and though he accepts this for the most part, many reviewers question the genuineness of Cohen's admission. Harding is disappointed that Cohen says nothing about his meetings with special counsel Robert Mueller and his Russian investigation team, nor about Paul Manafort, Trump's 2016 campaign manager who slipped off with aid Robert Gates to give critical polling information on the 2016 battleground states to Konstantin Kilimnick, a career Russian agent. Harding infers that including an account of his meeting with the Special Counsel Robert Mueller or Paul Manafort might have provided essential information regarding Cohen's knowledge of Russian interference and Trump's ties to interference in the 2016 election. Rather remarkably, considering the book was published two months before the election, Harding noted Cohen's prediction that he believed Trump would be very unlikely to quit if he lost the November 2020 election to Joe Biden. Instead, Cohen expected the president to attempt to cheat his way to victory, a tactic Cohen believed had served Trump well before.

Anastasia Tsioulcus of NPR writes a mixed review but notes that Cohen makes an interesting addition to the list of Trump's potential improprieties by asserting that Trump used Liberty University's John Gauger to alter online polls to bolster candidate Trump's reputation. Tsioulcus also reported on Cohen's admission that Trump worked closely with David Pecker, former CEO of American Media, whose publications include the National Enquirer, to "catch and kill" stories of Trump's relationships with women as well as to damage political rivals, particularly Sen. Ted Cruz. Tsioulcus details Cohen's admiration and loyalty to Trump as his motive for following him, but quotes Cohen when he writes what could be the book's central theme, "I bore witness to the real man, in strip clubs, shady business meetings and in the unguarded moments when he revealed who he really was: a cheat, a liar, a fraud, a bully, a racist, a predator, a con man." Tsioulcus notes that Cohen alternates in the book between taking responsibility for his questionable behavior and trying to effectively detail what he found so attractive yet ultimately self-destructive in following Trump.
