= David Schwartzman =

David Schwartzman may refer to:

- David Schwartzman (economist) (1924–2019), Canadian-born American economist
- David Schwartzman (geologist) (1943–2025), American professor of biology and geology
