= David Schwarz =

David Schwarz may refer to:

- David M. Schwarz, (born 1951) American New Classical architect
- David Schwarz (aviation inventor) (1852–1897), Croatian aviation pioneer of Hungarian Jewish origin
- David Schwarz (footballer) (born 1972), Australian rules footballer

== See also ==
- David Schwartz (disambiguation)
- Schwarz (disambiguation)
