= Adam Klasfeld =

American journalist

Adam Klasfeld is an American journalist who focuses on legal matters. He is co-founder and editor-in-chief of All Rise News, and also regularly contributes to a variety of other news outlets. Klasfeld was previously a playwright, and has written and directed several plays.

== Education ==
Klasfeld studied theatre at Rutgers University and followed up on his studies at the Academy of Theatre in London under Richard Digby Day.

== Journalistic career ==
As a courtroom reporter, Klasfeld covered the trial of Iranian businessman Reza Zarrab, who circumvented the U.S. sanction regime on Iran. He also reported on a similar case in which Halkbank, a Turkish state owned bank, was accused of circumventing the U.S. sanctions against Iran. On 23 September 2020, a court in Istanbul banned access to an article he wrote about Zarrab. He was accused by the Turkish newspaper Daily Sabah of being a complicit of the so-called terrorist organization FETÖ, the movement of Fethullah Gülen.

Other legal events Klasfeld has covered in his reporting for Courthouse News Service, Law and Crime, Just Security, MSNBC, Brian Tyler Cohen, and All Rise News include the first impeachment of U.S. President Donald Trump, the trial of former Trump lawyer Michael Cohen, the Prosecution of Donald Trump in New York, the E. Jean Carroll v. Donald J. Trump defamation lawsuits, the 2025 Trump libel lawsuit against The Wall Street Journal, and many of the legal issues arising during the second Trump administration.

=== All Rise News ===
All Rise News is an American online publisher of legal and political news featuring Klasfeld's work. It was co-founded by him and Tim Mak in March of 2025.

All Rise News provides free web content, a YouTube channel, podcasting as part of LegalAF on the MeidasTouch network, and a free or paid subscription-based Substack independent publication.

Much of Klasfeld's reporting is based on in-person courtroom attendance, with his distinctive gavel-to-gavel coverage considered an important competitive advantage by his customers and subscribers.

A story about All Rise News on FOX 5 DC remarked on its notable success in not just delivering news, but also in providing actionable information that facilitates responsive participation by its audience in shaping the political and legal landscape. The founders claim "radical newness" for their approach to journalism, which explicitly includes avowed goals to influence constituent calls to Congress, encourage the public's judicial and administrative oversight, and direct activist attention to protests.

== Theater career ==
His acting career began early at the Rutgers Cabaret. Thereafter he performed on several stages in the United States and Europe. He was often involved with the theater company called One Armed Man. In July 2009, his play The Report of My Death was performed on board a ship on the Hudson River, New York. He also organized a theater festival at the Brecht Forum.

=== Plays ===
- I Dreamed I Saw Joe Hill's Lover, Last Night
- The Prostitute of Reverie Valley
- Good Fences Make Good Neighbors
- The Report Of My Death
