= Scandal: How "Gotcha" Politics Is Destroying America =

Book by Lanny Davis

Scandal: How 'Gotcha' Politics Is Destroying America
- Front cover art for Scandal.
- Author: Lanny Davis
- Language: English
- Subject: Politics of the United States
- Publisher: Palgrave Macmillan
- Publication date: 12 September 2006
- Publication place: United States
- Media type: Print (hardcover), e-book
- Pages: 304
- ISBN: 978-1403974952
- Followed by: Crisis Tales: Five Rules for Coping With Crises in Business, Politics and Life

Scandal: How 'Gotcha' Politics Is Destroying America is a 2006 book by Lanny Davis, a lawyer who was special counsel to Bill Clinton, an appointee under George W. Bush, and advisor to Hillary Clinton during her 2008 campaign and later her 2016 campaign. The theme of the book is "that both [major political] parties [in the United States] have to learn to have civil debate, the[n] solve people's problem[s]," by working together in a bipartisan fashion. Moreover, Davis predicts that centrist 'purple' politicians could build a winning bipartisan coalition in that manner, in particular by winning over 'angry' independent voters fed up with scandal-mongering and incivility.

== Plot ==
Davis decries partisan-driven scandal-oriented politics specifically, and political polarization generally.

Politics as total (and personal) warfare is Washington's way of life now, and this has lowered the esteem of America's governmental institutions and demeaned the people who have come to the Capitol to serve the nation. —Carl M. Cannon, as quoted in the introduction to the book, originally published in a piece by Cannon for National Journal on February 13, 1999

Partisan scandal-mongering was not a new phenomenon in 2007. Davis mentions various historical scandals, such as:

- "the sexual scandals of Alexander Hamilton and Thomas Jefferson, each of whom attempted to use them to hurt the other politically" in the early 1800s
- Credit Mobilier in 1872
- the illegitimate child of Grover Cleveland ("information about which was to be leaked during his first presidential campaign in 1884" according to Davis)
- sexual relationship between Warren Harding and Nan Britton

Davis believes it to be a particularly important phenomena in the 1990s and beyond, however, saying that "over two centuries, there is a pattern of politicians using the media, and vice versa, in attempts to bring down political adversaries... Today's version of the post-Watergate scandal culture is different, however, in one significant and unprecedented way: its far greater destructive power." [emphasis in original]

In particular, the book contends several post-Watergate trends occurred in the journalism profession, the legal profession, and amongst elected politicians (to include the staffers and the major political parties and the partisan voter-base which helps get those politicians elected and re-elected), as well as the wider cultural moires of the general public:

- changes in the unwritten rules of investigative journalism which made publishing vague unproven allegations permissible, including especially no-holds-barred scandals related to purported corruption or alleged sexual behavior
- increasing competitive pressures of the 24-hour news cycle (and the internet), especially on fact-checking procedures
- the relatively new use and misuse of independent counsels by politicians in Congress, in addition to Congressional hearings
- increasing overuse of anonymous sources by the news media
- the intentional leaking of damaging material for partisan reasons by politicians and their staffers
- increasing willingness of the news media to publish material which implies guilt when all the facts are not yet known
- Davis writes that "perhaps most damning, Watergate showed reporters that bringing down a high-profile politician might lead to financial and professional gain, even if at the end of the day it results in no final determination or conviction of wrongdoing"
- increasingly non-competitive, gerrymandered, effectively one-party Congressional districts (which Davis calls "a major reason for the hyper-partisanship in Congress by both parties")
- increasing willingness of the voting public (especially the portion that participates in major-party political primaries and caucuses) to reward negativity
- increasing appetite among the partisan public for corruption scandals, sex scandals, and similar, plus decreasing demand such scandals actually be true
- increasing cynicism about the general public on the motives of politicians, journalists, and lawyers

The outcome of these broad trends is a type of never-ending arms race between the partisan subgroups found within both of the two major parties, with both sides using the media and the legal system to further their aims, whilst the news media and the lawyers used the scandals of both parties to make massive profits:

The bitter legacy of the 1960s and Watergate materialized over the last 30 years [aka 1977-2007] in the form of a scandal machine that has progressively generated a level of viciousness and personally destructive power unlike anything seen in America before. Given the fact that scandal and the sensationalistic journalism covering it is as American as apple pie, going back to the Founders of our Republic, that is really saying something. Since the late 1970s, this scandal machine has been truly different, however, not just in degree but in kind.

- Richard Nixon, 1974 (resigns to avoid impeachment)
- Raymond Donovan, 1977
- Independent Cousel Statute, 1978
- Robert Bork, 1986/1987 (see 'Borked up')
- Gary Hart, 1987
- Iran-Contra, 1987-1992 (Davis writes, "Lawrence Walsh made the reckless decision to re-indict former Defense Secretary Caspar Weinberger on the Friday before the 1992 presidential election, gratuitously and unnecessarily including in the indictment a reference to President (George H. W.) Bush... In retrospect it now seems clear that this was the ultimate criminalization of politics that had so outraged President Bush and leading Republicans at the time. No leading Democrat, and certainly no Clinton supporters cheering that final weekend at this very damaging blow to President Bush's reelection chances, complained publicly. (I [author Lanny Davis] certainly didn't!)..." but goes on to argue that this was a mistake in the long run.)
- Clarence Thomas, 1991
- Jim Wright, 1989
- Bill Clinton, 1995-1997 (Whitewater, Vincent Foster, Travelgate, fundraising practices, FBI files, Paula Jones, etc.)
- Newt Gingrich, 1997 (which Davis describes as part of the "...inevitable gotcha-cycle boomerang effect...")
- Bill Clinton, 1998-2000 ("...then there was the Monica incident -- after which all previous rules of media restraint rushed out the window" writes Davis, was special counsel to Clinton during part of the 1990s)
- Robert Livingston, 1999
- George W. Bush, 2002-2004 (Davis says, Much of the Democratic attacks on President Bush's decision to go to war in Iraq also has the unfortunate aroma of 'gotcha' politics. Instead of focusing on objective facts showing that President Bush and his advisers got it 'wrong' -- such as selective use and misuses of intelligence on weapons of mass destruction ... too many left-wing bloggers and Bush-bashing Democratic partisans have tried to prove that President Bush and senior administration officials 'lied'.")
- I. Lewis 'Scooter' Libby, 2005
- Jack Abramoff, 2005 (pleads guilty)
- Duke Cunningham, 2005 (pleads guilty)
- Tom DeLay, 2005/2006

In addition to listing specific incidents where the scandal-culture has been prominent, Davis wrote that the scandal-culture is harmful even when no high-profile incident is ongoing: "Meanwhile, the rantings on both the left and right of the shouters, food fighters, and hate-mongers on talk radio, cable television shows, and, in recent years, countless blogs go on, seemingly caring little about actual facts and truth before broadcasting and blogging accusations -- all of which add more reckless negative energy and fuel to the scandal machine and gotcha politics."

Davis believed that the key to breaking the back-and-forth cycle of 'gotcha' politics between the two major parties was a return to civility amongst politicians, as the first step on a path towards the return of respect for due process, and also for truth.

The result [of the never-ending cycle of gotcha politics] is that more and more Americans are fed up and, to borrow a phrases from Howard Beale's line in Network, are "mad as Hell and not going to take it anymore." And many Americans appear ready to join a growing revolt of the political center to take the country back. ...looking for political leaders who are able to get in front of this revolt, who can rise above the culture and vitriol of hyper-partisanship, who can debate deeply held ideas and political differences with civility, and who will focus on solving problems, not destroying political opponents. A fundamental realignment of the alienated center-left and center-right into a new centrist majority may happen in the 2008 presidential election.... which party leaders, if any, have the political courage and political will to seize the moment and take a stand against 'gotcha' politics, against the scandal culture that has corrupted American politics for far too long ...win the presidency in 2008 -- and then reach across the aisle to form a grand coalition government drawn from both parties....

Davis backed Hillary Clinton in the 2008 election, shortly after the book was published. Davis published a column for several years called Purple Nation which expounded on aspects of his thesis that there was a winning coalition of centrists and independents to be found, in between the extremes of partisan politics.

== Reception ==
According to the author, the book received praise from Democratic Senator Evan Bayh and Joe Lieberman, Democratic Leadership Council CEO Al From, law professor Alan M. Dershowitz, and conservative commentator Michael Medved.

== See also ==
- Media bias in the United States and yellow journalism
- Trial by media and guilt by association
- Congressional hearings and Independent Counsels
- Leak (political) and lie of omission
- Vast right-wing conspiracy and lamestream media
- Whispering campaign and character assassination
- Sensationalism (especially by the news media) and junk food news
- Clinton '08 and Clinton '16
