= Scandale (company) =

Scandale French Women Clothing Company

- Company type: Women's clothing (Lingerie)
- Industry: Retail
- Founded: 1930
- Founder: Robert Perrier
- Key people: Halle Berry, Erik Ryd
- Products: Lingerie
- Website: www.scandale.com

Scandale is a French clothing designer credited with the invention of the girdle and the first company to mass-produce a product using the fabrics Lycra and Lastex. Their innovation greatly impacted the fashion industry and the way women around the world wore undergarments. They were also the first company to use illustrations in advertising, important to French culture, and using contemporary French illustrators, artists, and photographers, like René Gruau (of Christian Dior), who also designed the iconic Scandale logo.

== 1930s - 1940s ==
The brand was created in France in 1932 by textile supplier Robert Perrier.

In 1938, Scandale constructed an advanced manufacturing facility in France, with a pioneer workspace focusing on airflow, natural sunlight, and space planning, while featuring a pioneering R&D laboratory.

In the early ’30s, the gained popularity quickly expanding into Lyon, Marseille, Nice, Brussels, London, Turin, Cairo, Madrid, Beirut, and New York City.

== 1950s – 1960s ==
Scandale retained popularity throughout the 1950s, incorporating Lycra fabric in lingerie, most notably the “Avant-Garde” collection in the late 1950s, a second skin innovation. “Petit Scandale” was also introduced during this time, a superelastic tulle considered to be a supportive and light girdle at the market with tangible results. Scandale also introduced an inflatable bra, Very Secret, following its competitor La Resista.

In the late 1960s, Scandale expanded its range through velvet and innovative panels, offering enhanced elasticity and movement, introducing the “Superélastique 211.”

Scandale was also well known for its continuous collaborations with talented illustrators, artists, and photographers. The most iconic Scandale posters were created in 1952-1953 by René Gruau (of Christian Dior) who also designed the iconic Scandale logo.

Scandale continues to grow in sales network and was one of the major trading companies in Europe until the 1990s

== 2000s ==
Hop Lun, which was founded by Swedish entrepreneur Erik Ryd, purchased Scandale in 2008.

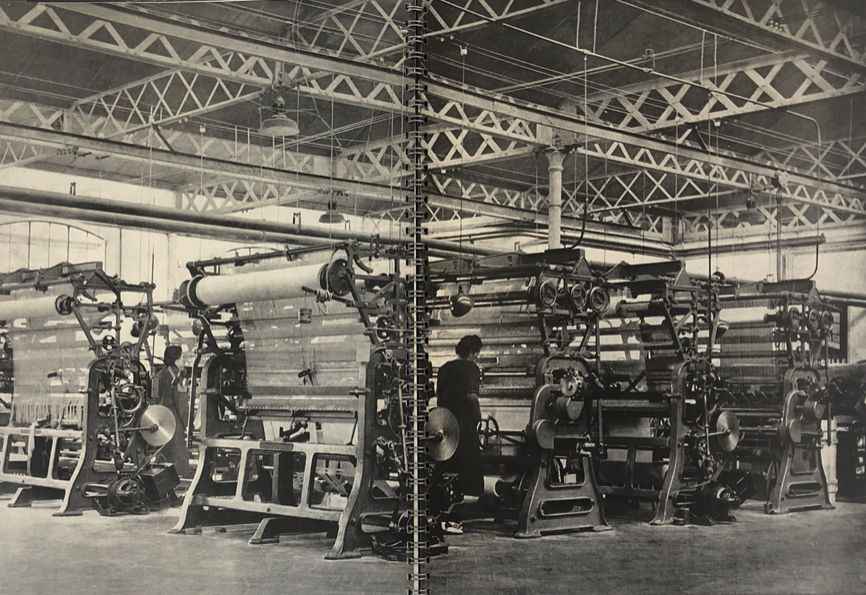
Scandale factory in 1930s

In 2014 actress Halle Berry became a co-owner of Scandale and partnered with Target Department Store to distribute the brand. Berry and Target also expanded its collection line with nightgowns and swimsuits added to the range.

Scandale Paris was also expanded to Europe, Canada and Asia in late 2015.

In 2017, Erik Ryd purchased back the majority shares of Scandale as a private investor.
