= Tim Mak =

American journalist

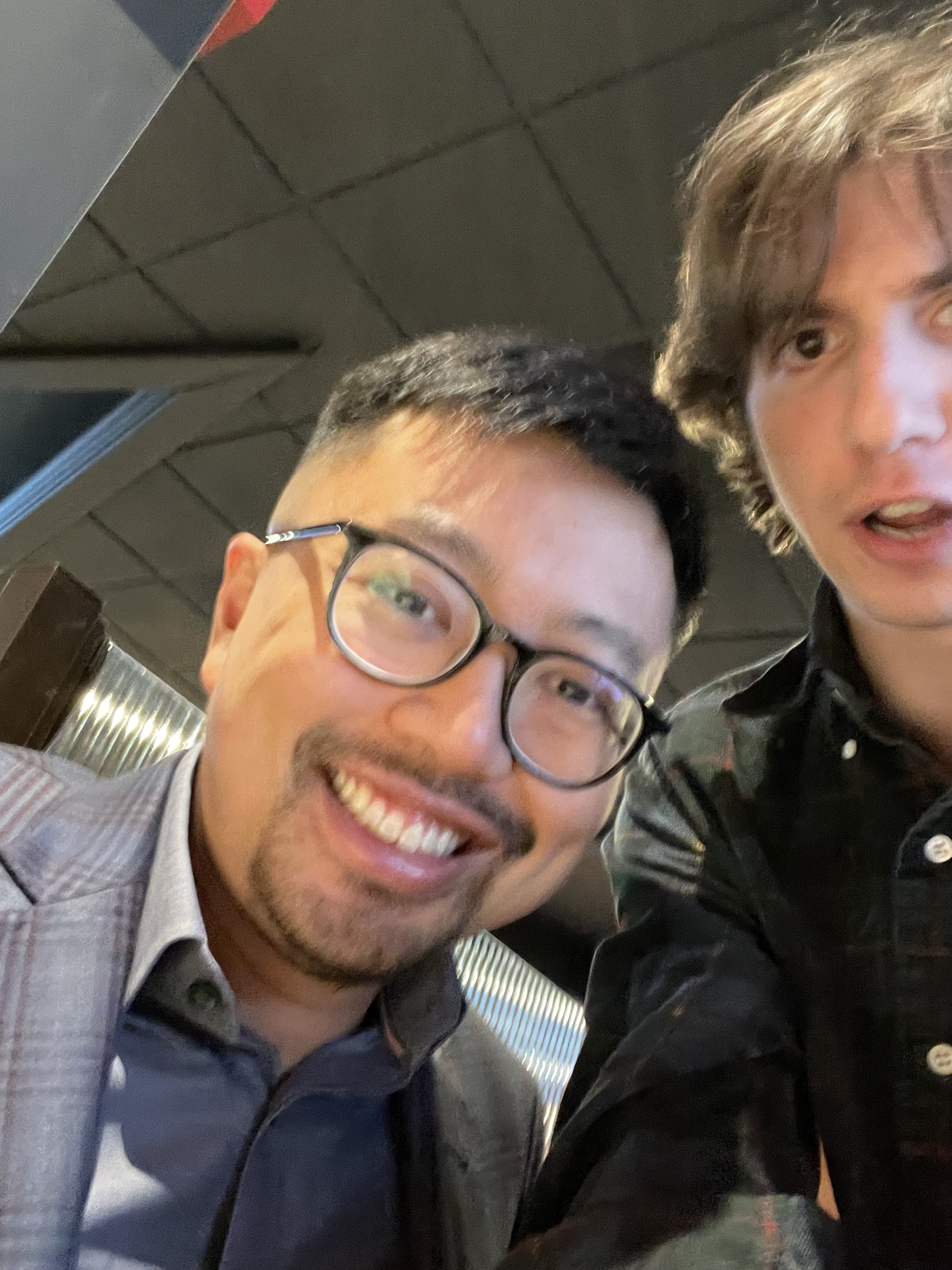
- Born: October 24
- Education: McGill University
- Occupation: Journalist
- Years active: 2009–present
- Employer: The Counteroffensive

Tim Mak is a Canadian-American journalist and editor of the Kyiv-based publication The Counteroffensive. Previously an investigative correspondent for National Public Radio, he covers national security, politics, and the role of emerging technologies. He is the author of Misfire: Inside the Downfall of the NRA (E. P. Dutton, 2021) about the gun organization's inner workings.

== Career ==
He graduated as valedictorian from McGill University.

Mak broke the news about a Russian national in Washington, D.C. named Maria Butina, who would later be convicted for acting as a Russian agent. After President Donald Trump's lawyer Michael Cohen threatened Mak in an attempt to prevent the publication of a story about Trump, the journalist published the recorded audio of Cohen's threats.

In 2020, Mak obtained recorded audio of then-Senate Intelligence Committee Chairman Richard Burr making a private speech about how devastating the coming COVID-19 pandemic would be, in contrast to his optimistic public messaging. After it was revealed that he sold millions of dollars in stocks around the period he gave this speech, the senator was investigated for possible insider trading.

He has also written extensively on the National Rifle Association of America (NRA). In 2021, he published secret tapes showing how the organization's executives reacted in strategy sessions following the Columbine High School massacre.

He covered the 2022 Russian invasion of Ukraine from within the country, having arrived the night the invasion began. His investigations in Ukraine include tracking down the 53rd Anti-Aircraft Missile Brigade, the unit which shot down MH-17; and investigating a war crime in the town of Nova Basan.

In May 2023, he launched The Counteroffensive, a newsletter that publishes narrative journalism and personal experiences from Ukraine during the Russian invasion. It also reports from other places where people face challenges from authoritarianism, such as Syria, Georgia, and Taiwan. He told Slate magazine that he wants to tell "deeply-reported human interest stories that humanize events." By 2025, The Counteroffensive had become the most-read publication in Substack's 'International' category. With a "small team of local journalists" operating in Kyiv, the audience had grown to approximately 150,000 subscribers, according to Forbes.

Politico cofounder Robert Allbritton invested in Mak's company in 2025 to help expand The Counteroffensive's B2B defense technology publication, The Arsenal. It now has operations in Kyiv, Brussels and Berlin.

In 2026, after the beginning of the war in Iran, Mak expanded his coverage of international war with a new Substack publication called Iran War Dispatches with Tim Mak.
