= Simon Garber =

- Born: 1966 (age 59–60); Odesa, Ukrainian SSR, Soviet Union (now Ukraine)
- Other name: Symon Garber
- Occupations: President and CEO, Yellow Cab SLS Jet Management Corp. and Chicago Carriage Cab Co.; Founding Partner, Triglobal Financial Services Inc.; Founder, Moscow Taxi
- Spouse: Lina
- Children: Shaun Francis (b. 1993); Jeffrey Lawrence (b. 1995); Enette; Tyler (b. 1989); Shane

Simon Garber (born 1966) is president and CEO of several taxi cab companies including Yellow Cab SLS Jet Management Corp in New York City and Chicago Carriage Cab Company in Chicago. Garber's companies are estimated to have the highest number of medallions in both Long Island City and Chicago, earning Garber the nickname of "Taxi King". Garber's cab companies have been involved in several scandals including the illegal use of salvaged police cars in the Chicago fleet and overcharging cab drivers in New York for leasing a medallion. In 2009, Garber founded the International Polo Club of Colts Neck near his residence in Colts Neck, New Jersey.

== Early life ==
Simon Garber was born in 1966 in Odesa, Ukrainian SSR, Soviet Union (now Ukraine). In 1978, Garber immigrated with his parents to New Jersey where his father was a sheet-metal worker and his mother was a nurse. Garber reports that he initially had difficulty with bullying in school, until he joined a group of Lubavitchers who paid for him to attend a Jewish day school and helped him get a summer job at a Jewish camp.

== Career ==
Garber started driving taxi cabs in New York City at the age of 18 to help pay for college, eventually owning two cabs. Soon he was buying and selling New York medallions (city-regulated individual permits to operate a cab) for a profit. Garber has claimed to be the holder of the most New York medallions, with over 400 to his name, though the state's Attorney General office has stated that he only controls 275. In 1992, Garber became friends with Russian politician Vladimir Slutsker while on vacation in Monaco. Through Slutsker, Garber was introduced to several Russian high-ranking officials. Three years later, Slutsker convinced Garber to start the company Moscow Taxi with Garber's brother-in-law Eduard Sheinen. Using his political ties, Garber's business eventually grew to over 2,500 vehicles before a weak Russian economy forced the company to downsize the fleet. While in Russia in 2001, Garber became friends with Patrick Daley, the son of long-time Chicago mayor Richard M. Daley. City officials tightly regulate all aspects of medallions ownership, granting permission to purchase medallions on an individual basis. Within a year of meeting Patrick, Garber quickly acquired over 300 Chicago taxi medallions. Garber also hired Mayor Daley's former chief of staff Gery Chico as a City Hall lobbyist. In 2003, Garber used this political capital to start the Chicago Carriage Cab Company and was granted permission to operate the taxi business in Chicago. Within six years, the Chicago Carriage Cab Company had amassed over 800 medallions, making it the largest taxi company in the city.

Michael Cohen and Garber were associates together with large interests in taxi companies in the United States.

== Interests ==
Garber enjoys playing polo and has a training area on his 10-acre estate in Colts Neck, New Jersey. In 2009, Garber founded the International Polo Club of Colts Neck, which is located in New Jersey. Garber's polo teams are sponsored by his taxi companies, and compete in events worldwide.

== Controversy ==
=== Illegal use of salvage vehicles as taxis ===
In 2010 city officials in Chicago investigated claims that some of the taxis in the city had been previously categorized as salvage vehicles (typically an insurance designation meaning the vehicles were damaged enough that it would cost more to fix the vehicle than the intrinsic worth of vehicle). Chicago law prohibits operating any vehicle as a taxi that was once deemed a salvage title. Chicago investigators found over 340 vehicles, of which 183 vehicles belonged to Garber's Chicago Carriage Cab Company. Garber had bought salvaged police cars, cleaned the titles of the salvage designation, and then illegally added the vehicles to his fleet. City officials fined Garber and his business associates up to $50,000 per vehicle for a total of $9 million. Garber's 183 salvage vehicles represented approximately 20% of his entire fleet. The prosecutors also estimated that many of the cars had been in service for up to 4 years prior to the investigation. Additionally, the Chicago Sun-Times newspaper investigated 100 of Garber's taxis from other fleets not associated with Chicago and found that 23 had previously been designated as salvage titles. The newspaper stated that it was unknown whether those vehicles were still in circulation. More details of the salvage scheme (and further implication of Garber's involvement) became available through the 2014 trial of one of Garber's business partners, Alexsandr Igolnikov, who was convicted of conspiracy as well as interstate transportation and possession of false automobile titles. Igolnikov was responsible for purchasing the salvage vehicles, repairing them, and then working through corrupt auto brokers to obtain clean titles from Indiana or Illinois. Once the new titles were secured, the salvaged vehicles were painted maroon and entered into Garber's taxi fleet as well as other fleets co-owned by Garber and Igolnikov. Igolnikov would repair and paint the vehicles in a garage owned by Garber.

=== Improper charging of taxi operators ===
On August 12, 2014, the Attorney General along with the Taxi and Limousine Commission for the state of New York announced that Garber's Yellow Cab SLS Jet Management Corp. had agreed to pay approximately $1.6 million in restitution and fines for overcharging cab drivers that leased vehicles from Garber. The taxi drivers who leased through Garber were required to pre-pay to lease the taxi, but did not provide a way for this to be done. If the taxi driver did not pre-pay, the driver was assessed a "late fee" at the time of payment, effectively ensuring that a late fee was included on every lease agreement. A few drivers reported that when they contacted the company for an explanation of the late fees, they were told that the fee was for leasing a hybrid fuel car, which is illegal in the state of New York. The Attorney General estimated that Garber's practice had overcharged approximately 2,000 taxi drivers. As part of the settlement, Garber agreed to pay approximately $1.4 million in restitution to the taxi drivers and $200,000 in fines and fees.

=== Employment of taxi drivers with a history of repeated vehicle citations ===
In 2012 the Chicago Tribune found that Garber's Chicago Carriage Cab Company had repeatedly employed cab drivers with a history of repeated moving vehicle violations. One such driver, Rida Lemghari, had been given 46 citations, of which he was found liable in 33 cases. Five of these citations occurred over a three-month time period, during which Lemghari was driving for Garber's company. Additionally, from 2006 to 2008, Lemghari collected 14 total citations while driving in Garber's taxis. Lobbying by the taxi industry enabled the inclusion of language in a repeat-offender law that allowed officials to voluntarily not enforce the law on a case-by-case basis. Unenforced regulation of repeat offenders allowed Garber to continue to employ these drivers, and when the investigation was announced, Garber did not face any sanctions.
