= Michael Cohen (lawyer) =

Attorney for Donald Trump from 2006 to 2018

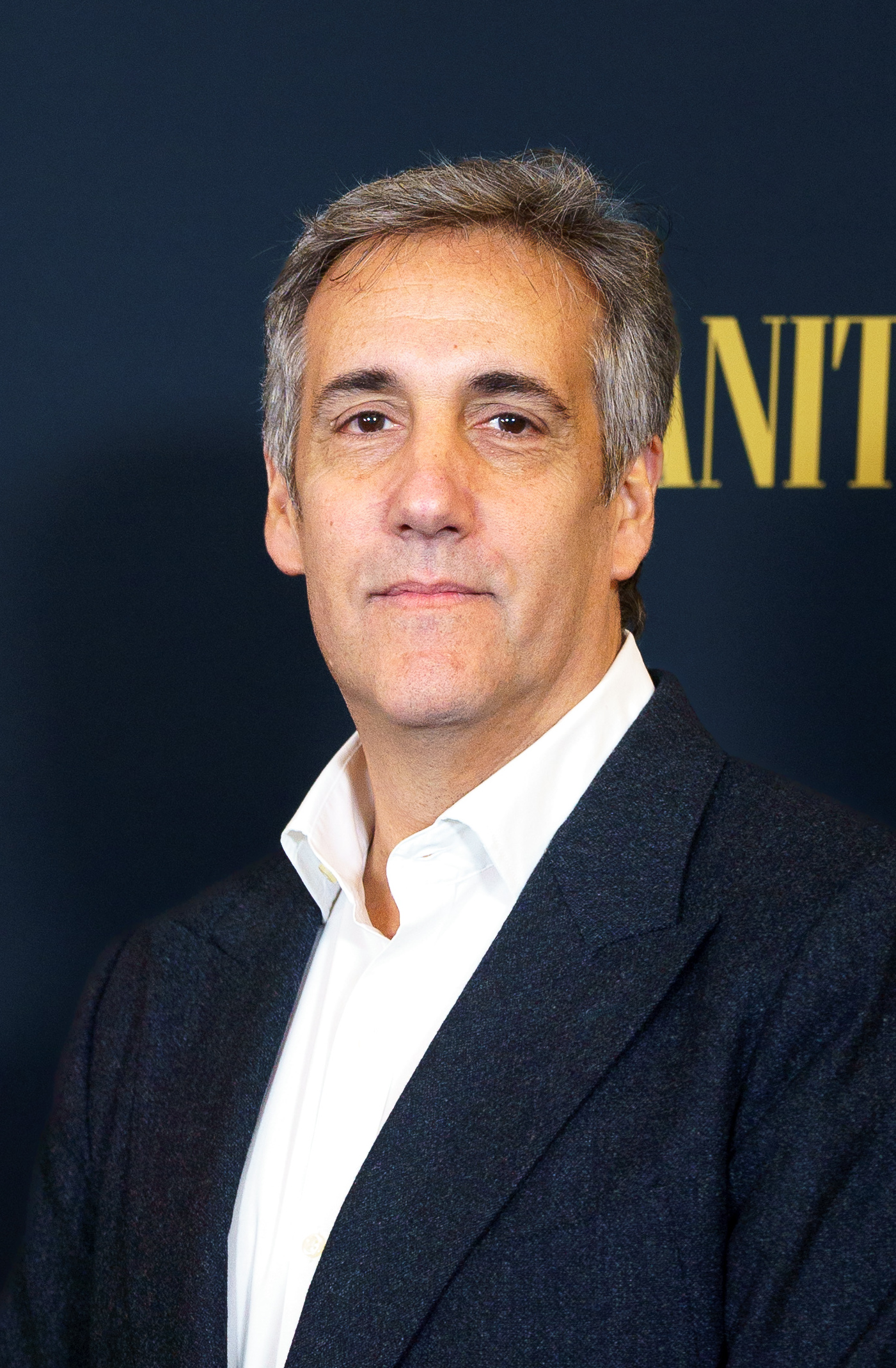
- Cohen in 2024
- Born: Michael Dean Cohen; August 25, 1966 (age 60); Lawrence, New York, U.S.
- Education: American University (BA); Cooley Law School (JD)
- Political party: Democratic (before 2002; 2004–2017; 2018–present); Republican (2002–2004; 2017–2018)
- Spouse: Laura Shusterman (m. 1994)
- Children: 2
- Criminal information
- Status: Sentence finished, released under court supervision of 3 years
- Convictions: Fraud; perjury
- Criminal charges: 5 counts of tax evasion; 1 count of making false statements to a financial institution; 1 count of willfully causing an unlawful corporate contribution; 1 count of making an excessive campaign contribution at the request of a candidate or campaign; 1 count of making false statements to a congressional committee
- Penalty: 3 years in federal prison; fines; asset forfeiture; disbarment

Michael Dean Cohen (born August 25, 1966) is a former American lawyer who served as an attorney for Donald Trump, the 45th and 47th president of the United States, from 2006 to 2018. Cohen served as a vice president of the Trump Organization and personal counsel to Trump, often being described as his fixer. Cohen served as co-president of Trump Entertainment. From 2017 to 2018, Cohen was deputy finance chairman of the Republican National Committee.

Trump employed Cohen until May 2018, a year after the special counsel investigation into Russian interference in the 2016 U.S. elections began. In August 2018, Cohen pleaded guilty to eight counts including campaign-finance violations, tax fraud, and bank fraud. Cohen said he violated campaign-finance laws at Trump's direction "for the principal purpose of influencing" the 2016 presidential election. In November 2018, Cohen pleaded guilty to lying to U.S. congressional committees about efforts to build a Trump Tower in Moscow.

In December 2018, Cohen was sentenced to three years in federal prison and ordered to pay a $50,000 fine. In February 2019, the New York Supreme Court, Appellate Division, disbarred him from practicing law in the state. In May 2019, he reported to the federal prison near Otisville, New York. In November 2021, he completed his sentence.

In early 2019, Cohen sued the Trump Organization for allegedly failing to reimburse his legal fees; in July 2023, the parties reached a settlement ahead of a planned trial. In early 2023, Trump sued Cohen for allegedly breaching his legal trust; in October 2023, Trump dropped the suit ahead of a planned deposition.

== Early life and education ==
Cohen was raised in the town of Lawrence on Long Island, New York. His mother was a nurse, and his father, a Holocaust survivor, was a surgeon. Cohen is Ashkenazi Jewish. He attended Woodmere Academy and received his BA from American University in 1988 and his JD from Thomas M. Cooley Law School in 1991.

== Career ==
=== Law ===
Cohen began practicing personal injury law in New York in 1992, working for Melvyn Estrin in Manhattan.

In 2006, Cohen was a partner at the law firm Phillips, Nizer, Benjamin, Krim & Ballon. He practiced law at the firm for about a year before joining The Trump Organization. Following his 2018 felony convictions, Cohen was disbarred in New York.

=== Business ===
In 2003, Cohen was a candidate for New York City Council when he provided a biography to the New York City Campaign Finance Board for inclusion in its voters' guide. The guide listed him as co-owner of Taxi Funding Corp. and a fleet of New York City taxicabs numbering over 200. At the time, Cohen was a business partner in the taxi business with "taxi king" Simon Garber. He was also CEO of MLA Cruises, Inc., and of the Atlantic Casino. As of 2017, Cohen was estimated to own at least 34 taxi medallions through 17 limited liability companies (LLCs). Until April 2017, another "taxi king", disbarred attorney and convicted felon Gene Freidman, managed the medallions still held by Cohen; this arrangement ended after the city's Taxi and Limousine Commission decided not to renew Freidman's licenses. Between April and June 2017, the New York State Department of Taxation and Finance filed seven tax warrants against Cohen and his wife for $37,434 in unpaid taxi taxes due to the Metropolitan Transportation Authority.

Cohen has been involved in real estate ventures in Manhattan, including the purchase and sale of four apartment buildings between 2011 and 2014. The total purchase price of the four buildings was $11 million and the total sales price was $32 million. Cohen sold the four properties at above their assessed values, in all-cash transactions, to LLCs owned by persons whose identities are not public. After this was reported by McClatchy DC in October 2017, Cohen said that all four properties were purchased by an American-owned "New York real estate family fund" that paid cash for the properties in order to obtain a tax-deferred (Section 1031) exchange, but did not specifically identify the buyer.

In 2015, Cohen purchased an Upper East Side apartment building for $58 million.

=== Politics ===
Cohen volunteered for the 1988 presidential campaign of Michael Dukakis. He was also an intern for Congressman Joe Moakley and voted for Barack Obama in 2008, although he later stated that he became disappointed with Obama.

Michael Cohen
(@MichaelCohen212)
tweeted:

Made the official move today and joined the #RepublicanParty! It took a great man (@POTUS) to get me to make the switch. #MAGA

March 9, 2017

In 2003, he unsuccessfully ran as a Republican for the New York City Council's 4th council district. (a Manhattan district). Cohen received 4,205 votes and was defeated by Democratic candidate Eva S. Moskowitz, who received 13,745 votes. In 2010, Cohen briefly campaigned for a seat in the New York State Senate. He was a registered Democrat until he officially registered as a Republican on March 9, 2017. On October 11, 2018, Cohen re-registered as a Democrat to distance "himself from the values of the current" administration.

=== Donald Trump ===
Cohen joined the Trump Organization in late 2006. Trump hired him in part because he was already an admirer of Trump, having read Trump's The Art of the Deal twice. He had purchased several Trump properties and convinced his own parents and in-laws, as well as a business partner, to buy condominiums in Trump World Tower. Cohen aided Trump in his struggle with the condominium board at the Trump World Tower, which led Trump to obtain control of the board. Cohen became a close confidant to Trump, maintaining an office near him at Trump Tower. However, Cohen, who continued to serve as a lawyer for other clients, was not employed by the Trump Organization's legal department and instead answered directly to Trump as a personal lawyer.

In 2008, Cohen was named chief operating officer of mixed martial arts promotion company Affliction Entertainment, in which Trump held a significant financial stake.

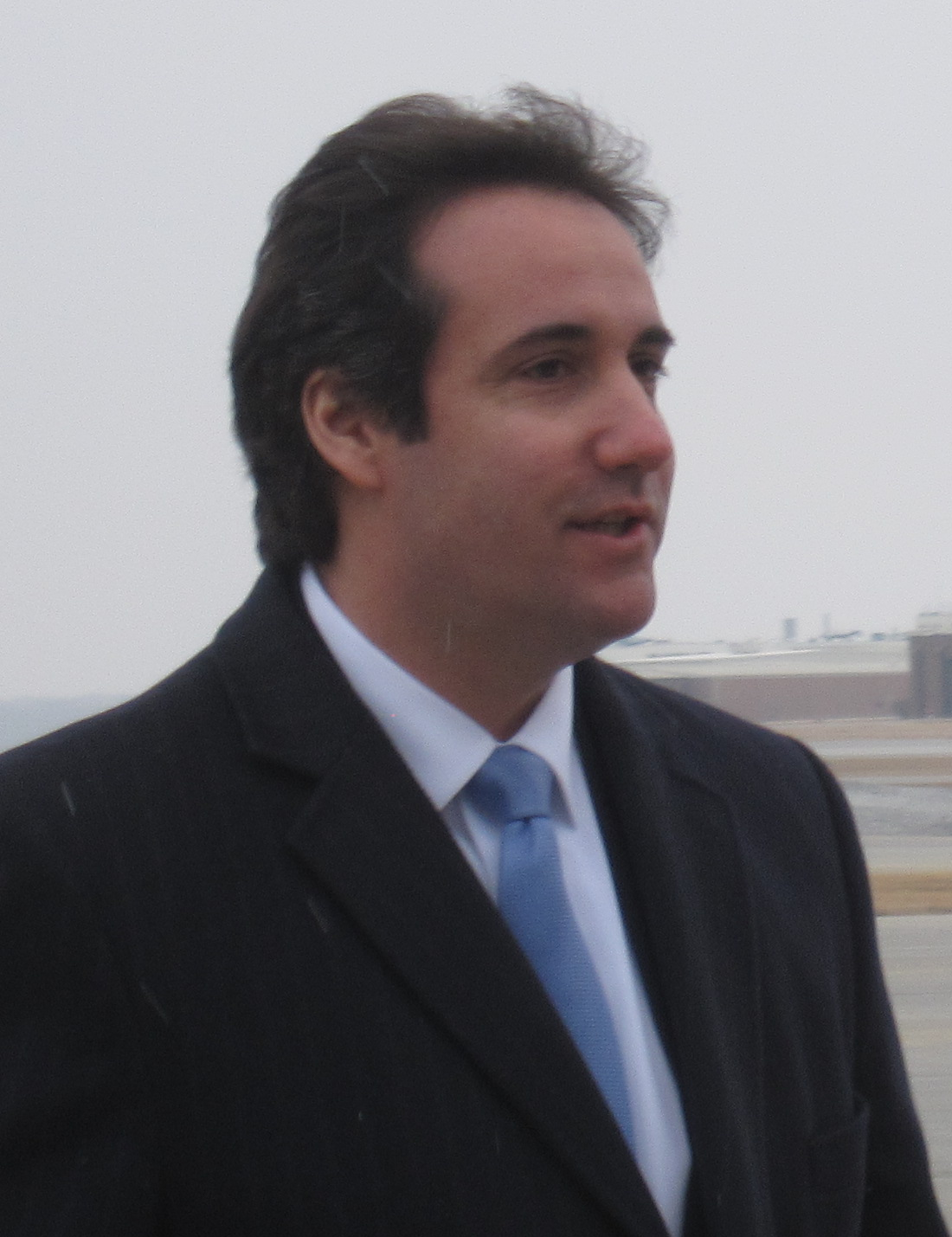
Cohen in 2011

While Cohen was an executive at the Trump Organization, he was known as Trump's "pit bull". In late 2011, when Trump was publicly speculating about running for the 2012 Republican Party presidential nomination, Cohen co-founded the website "Should Trump Run?" to draft Trump into entering the race.

In a 2011 interview with ABC News, Cohen stated, "If somebody does something Mr. Trump doesn't like, I do everything in my power to resolve it to Mr. Trump's benefit. If you do something wrong, I'm going to come at you, grab you by the neck and I'm not going to let you go until I'm finished."

In 2013, Cohen sent an email to the satirical news website The Onion, demanding that an article it had published mocking Trump ("When You're Feeling Low, Just Remember I'll Be Dead In About 15 or 20 Years") be removed with an apology, claiming it was defamatory.

In 2015, in response to an inquiry by reporter Tim Mak of The Daily Beast concerning rape allegations (brought up in the 1980s but later recanted) by Ivana Trump about her then-husband Donald Trump, Cohen said, "I'm warning you, tread very fucking lightly, because what I'm going to do to you is going to be fucking disgusting."

In April 2016, along with Darrell C. Scott, Cohen was a co-founder of the National Diversity Coalition for Trump. Peter J. Gleason, a lawyer who filed for protection of documents pertaining to two women with sexual-abuse allegations against Eric T. Schneiderman, stated—without offering details or corroborating evidence—that Cohen told him that if Trump had been elected governor of New York in 2013, the latter would have helped bring the accusations to public attention.

In mid-2016, Cohen defended Trump against allegations of antisemitism. Later that year, part of a video interview of Cohen by CNN's Brianna Keilar went viral, in which Cohen said "Says who?" several times in response to Keilar's statement that Trump was behind in all of the polls.

In May 2024, Cohen testified that while he did not desire a job based in Washington D.C. and wanted to remain in New York, he did hope to become a personal lawyer to the President. He also testified that his relationship with Trump began deteriorating when he cut his 2016 bonus by two-thirds and kept refusing to make him a personal lawyer to the President after he took office. In further testimony, Cohen stated that he would remain loyal to Trump even after the FBI raid on his home and office, until his wife, daughter and son persuaded him to no longer lie on Trump's behalf. Soon after the family meeting occurred, Cohen entered a plea of guilty to campaign finance violations, tax evasion and lying to Congress.

In July 2024, Cohen asked the Supreme Court to allow him to sue Trump. Cohen claimed that Trump had retaliated against him by having him sent back to prison after his 2020 release, following his announcement that he would write a book criticizing Trump. Lower courts had previously dismissed his lawsuit. In October, the Supreme Court declined to hear his appeal.

==== Regarding Russia ====
In January 2016, according to The Washington Post, Cohen sent an email to Russian politician Dmitry Peskov which was the "most direct outreach documented by a top Trump aide to a similarly senior member of Putin's government".

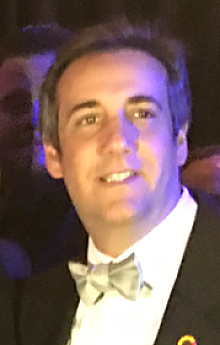
Cohen in 2017

The January 2017 Steele dossier alleges that Cohen met with Russian officials in Prague, Czech Republic, in 2016 with the objective of paying those who had hacked the DNC and to "cover up all traces of the hacking". The dossier contains raw intelligence, and is thought to be a mix of accurate and inaccurate information. Cohen denied the allegations, stating that he was in Los Angeles between August 23 and 29, and in New York for the entire month of September. According to a Czech intelligence source, there is no record of him directly entering Prague by plane, although he ostensibly could have taken land transport from a neighboring country within the Schengen Area of the European Union (EU), the initial entry into which would have been recorded. On April 13, 2018, McClatchy Newspapers's Washington, D.C., bureau reported that Special Counsel Robert Mueller had evidence (including two sources) that Cohen travelled to Prague from Germany in mid-to-late 2016, which itself would not have required a passport stamp. Cohen again denied ever traveling to Prague or to the EU in August 2016. In December 2018, McClatchy reported that in mid-to-late 2016 a cellphone of Cohen's was detected around Prague and that an eastern European intelligence agency had intercepted a Russian communication saying that Cohen was in Prague. The 2019 Mueller report claimed that "Cohen ... never traveled to Prague and was not concerned about those allegations, which he believed were provably false".

In late January 2017, Cohen met with Ukrainian opposition politician Andrey Artemenko and Felix Sater at the Loews Regency in Manhattan to discuss a plan to lift sanctions against Russia. The proposed plan would require that Russian forces withdraw from eastern Ukraine and that Ukraine hold a referendum on whether Crimea should be "leased" to Russia for 50 or 100 years. Cohen was given a written proposal in a sealed envelope that he delivered to then-National Security Advisor Michael Flynn in early February.

In May 2017, amidst expanding inquiries into alleged Russian interference in the 2016 U.S. election, two congressional panels asked Cohen to provide information about any communications he had with people connected to the Russian government. He was a subject of the Mueller investigation in 2018. Because of these investigations, Cohen and Trump signed a joint defense agreement allowing their attorneys to share information during the Mueller investigations and joint defense agreements were arranged between Trump and both Flynn and Paul Manafort. Cohen retained an attorney with Davidoff Hutcher & Citron who later also represented Rudy Giuliani.

==== Payment to Stormy Daniels ====
In late 2016, adult-film actress Stormy Daniels (legal name Stephanie Clifford) was speaking to some reporters and said that she had had a sexual affair with Trump in 2006. In October, Cohen and Daniels' attorney Keith M. Davidson negotiated a non-disclosure agreement (NDA) under which she was to be paid $130,000 hush money. Cohen created a Delaware LLC called Essential Consultants and used it to pay the $130,000. The arrangement was reported by The Wall Street Journal in January 2018.

Cohen told The New York Times in February 2018 that he paid the $130,000 to Daniels from his own pocket; he also said that the payment was not a campaign contribution and he was not reimbursed by either the Trump Organization or the Trump campaign. The Washington Post later noted that, by stating that he used his own money to "facilitate" the payment, Cohen was not ruling out the possibility that Trump, as an individual, reimbursed Cohen for the payment. In April 2018, Trump acknowledged for the first time that Cohen had represented him in the Daniels case, after previously having denied knowledge of the $130,000 payment.

On March 5, The Wall Street Journal cited anonymous sources recounting Cohen as saying he missed two deadlines to pay Daniels because Cohen "couldn't reach Mr. Trump in the hectic final days of the presidential campaign", and that after Trump's election, Cohen had complained that he had not been reimbursed for the payment. Cohen described this report as "fake news".

On March 9, NBC News reported that Cohen had used his Trump Organization email to negotiate with Daniels regarding her NDA, and that Cohen had used the same Trump Organization email to arrange for a transfer for funds that would eventually lead to Daniels' payment. In response, Cohen acknowledged that he had transferred funds from his home equity line of credit to the LLC and from the LLC to Daniels' attorney.

In a March 25, 2018, interview with 60 Minutes, Daniels said that she and Trump had sex once, and that later she had been threatened in front of her infant daughter and felt pressured to later sign an NDA.

On March 26, David Schwarz, a lawyer for Cohen, told ABC's Good Morning America that Daniels was lying in the 60 Minutes interview. Cohen's lawyer sent a cease-and-desist letter claiming that Daniels' statements constituted "libel per se and intentional infliction of emotional distress" to Cohen.

Cohen initiated a private arbitration case against Daniels in February 2018, based on an NDA signed by Daniels in October 2016 in exchange for $130,000. Cohen obtained an order from an arbitrator barring Daniels from publicly discussing her alleged relationship with Trump. Daniels subsequently brought a lawsuit in federal court against Trump and Cohen, arguing that the NDA was legally invalid because Trump never signed it. Cohen responded by seeking to compel arbitration, which would avoid public proceedings. In April 2018, Cohen filed a declaration in the court saying that he would invoke his Fifth Amendment right not to incriminate himself in the Daniels lawsuit.

On May 18, lawyers for Cohen filed an objection to Daniels' lawyer Michael Avenatti being allowed to represent her in a case involving Cohen, claiming it (the objection) was based on the violations of ethical rules and local court rules, among other issues. After Cohen's August 2018 conviction, Trump stated that the payment to Daniels came from him personally and not from the campaign during a Fox & Friends interview.

On May 13, 2024, Cohen directly implicated Trump when he testified during Trump's New York criminal trial that Trump directed him to make the hush money payment to Daniels and also signed off on Allen Weisselberg's plan on how to reimburse him. Cohen would also bring up his history in dealing with the Daniels allegation and planning out the non-disclosure agreement, including his suggestion to include a clause ensuring that Daniels would required to pay $1,000,000 for every time she violated the agreement by telling her story. He would also bring up conversations he had with Trump and people tied to Trump and Daniels as well. On May 14, 2024, Cohen admitted to pressuring Daniels attorney Keith Davidson to get Daniels to sign the statement where she denied the affair, stating he knew the statement was false. According to Cohen, Daniels wanted an appearance on Fox News' Hannity, though she would end up not doing the interview.

==== Recording of discussion regarding Karen McDougal ====
In late 2016, Karen McDougal, a former Playboy model, claimed that she and Trump had an affair from 2006 until 2007, a claim that Trump has denied. The National Enquirer paid McDougal $150,000 for her story but never published it, a practice known as catch and kill. On September 30, 2016, Cohen created Resolution Consultants LLC, a Delaware shell company, to purchase the rights to McDougal's story from the National Enquirer, though the rights to the story were ultimately never purchased.

Cohen had been known to record conversations and phone calls with other people. According to his lawyer Lanny Davis, "Michael Cohen had the habit of using his phone to record conversations instead of taking notes." Altogether the prosecutors have been given more than one hundred audio recordings from the material seized from Cohen in the April 2018 raid; reportedly only one of them featured a substantive conversation with Trump.

On July 20, 2018, it was revealed that Cohen secretly recorded a conversation between Trump and him. The discussion involved a potential hush payment to the publisher of the National Enquirer. The recording had been classified as a privileged attorney–client communication by the Special Master reviewing the Cohen material, but Trump's attorneys waived that claim, meaning that prosecutors can have it and use it. The conversation in that tape occurred in September 2016, two months before the election and weeks after the Enquirer paid McDougal the $150,000. In the conversation, Trump and Cohen discuss whether to buy the rights to her story from the Enquirer, and Trump appears to approve the idea. Trump's lawyer, Rudy Giuliani, initially claimed that the tape shows Trump saying "make sure it's done correctly, and make sure it's done by check". Giuliani also noted that no payment was ultimately made, and asserted that Trump's team waived privilege and allowed the recording to be revealed because it shows no violation of law. The recording appears to contradict Hope Hicks, then Trump's spokeswoman, who said when the story of the Enquirer payment came out a few days before the election that the Trump campaign had "no knowledge of any of this".

On July 25, Cohen's attorney Lanny Davis released the actual recording to CNN, which played it on the air on the Cuomo Prime Time program. On it, Trump can be heard concluding a telephone conversation with an unidentified person and then discussing several items of business with Cohen. Cohen mentions that he needs to "open up a company for the transfer of all of that info regarding our friend David", interpreted as meaning David Pecker, the head of American Media, which publishes the National Enquirer. Later when they discuss financing, Trump is heard saying something about "pay with cash", to which Cohen responds "no, no, no", but the tape is unclear and it is disputed what is said next; the word "check" can be heard. A transcript provided by Trump's attorneys has Trump saying "Don't pay with cash ... check." The tape cuts off abruptly at that point. A lawyer for the Trump Organization said that any reference to "cash" would not have meant "green currency", but a one-time payment ("cash") vs. extended payments ("financing"), in either case accompanied by documents. According to Aaron Blake at The Washington Post, "the tape provides the first evidence that Trump spoke with Cohen about purchasing the rights to women's stories—apparently to silence them—before the 2016 election." He also notes that Cohen speaks in "somewhat coded language", which Trump understands, suggesting that he is already familiar with the issue.

Despite the taped conversation, on August 23, in a Fox News interview Trump stated that he was not aware of the hush-money payments until "later on": "Later on I knew. Later on. What he did—and they weren't taken out of the campaign finance, that's the big thing." He added: "In fact, my first question when I heard about it was, did they come out of the campaign, because that could be a little dicey. And they didn't come out of the campaign and that's big. But they weren't ... that's not even a campaign violation." According to U.S. election rules, any payments intended to influence an election vote must be reported, and the payments have raised questions about campaign-finance ethics.

On May 13, 2024, the jury in Trump's New York criminal trial would hear the taped conversation. On May 14, 2024, Cohen testified that McDougal's hush money was undertaken "in order to ensure that the possibility of Mr. Trump succeeding in the election — that this would not be a hindrance" and that he did not alter the recording of the conversation.

==== Later matters ====
On April 3, 2017, Cohen was appointed as one of three national deputy finance chairmen of the Republican National Committee (RNC), along with Elliott Broidy and Louis DeJoy. In April 2017, Cohen also formed an alliance with Squire Patton Boggs for legal and lobbying counsel on behalf of Trump. Despite serving as a consultant lawyer, Cohen later testified that Trump never made a personal lawyer to the President.

In May 2018, BBC News falsely reported that Cohen had received a secret payment of between $400,000 and $600,000 from intermediaries for Ukrainian President Petro Poroshenko to arrange a meeting between Poroshenko and Trump, though Cohen was not registered as a foreign agent. Cohen and the Ukrainian president's office denied the allegations. The BBC ended up having to state the allegation was untrue, apologizing to Poroshenko, deleting the article from its website, paying legal costs, and paying damages to Poroshenko.

In May 2018, Rudy Giuliani announced that Cohen was no longer Trump's lawyer.

In June 2018, Cohen resigned as deputy finance chairman of the RNC. His resignation letter cited the ongoing investigations and also criticized the Trump administration's policy of separating undocumented families at the border.

In July 2018, Cohen asserted that then-candidate Trump knew in advance about the June 2016 Trump Tower meeting between his son Donald Jr. and other Trump campaign officials with Russians who claimed to possess information damaging to the Hillary Clinton campaign, contradicting Trump's repeated insistence that he was not aware of the meeting until long after it had taken place.

In his May 2024 testimony, Cohen linked not only Trump, but also Allen Weisselberg to both the Stormy Daniels and Karen McDougal hush money payments. Cohen claimed that Weisselberg not only coordinated his reimbursement payments for his Stormy Daniels hush money payment, but also gave him the advice on how to make the McDougal payment by telling him to use creative ways which did not involve the Trump Organization. He also stated that Trump directed him to make the payment to Daniels in the wake of the Access Hollywood tape leak.

===== Lawsuit against Trump and countersuit =====
In March 2019, Cohen sued the Trump Organization for allegedly refusing to reimburse his legal fees regarding proceedings implicating Trump. Jury selection began on July 17, 2023, ahead of a trial which was set to start on July 24. On July 21, both parties agreed to an undisclosed settlement.

In April 2023, Trump sued Cohen for $500 million, alleging breaching the trust of their attorney–client privilege while making statements against Trump. Cohen sought documents from The Trump Organization to use in his defense. In August, Trump claimed that these documents "should be covered by a confidentiality order" and disclosing them could expose Trump "to the risk of self-incrimination" in other cases. On October 5, 2023, Trump dropped the suit after he was scheduled to give sworn testimony the following week.

===== Reconnecting with Trump =====
Despite his criticisms and testimony against Donald Trump, who would eventually win the 2024 U.S. presidential election, Cohen has since shifted his position on him by once again showing support for his former client in 2026, inviting him on his WABC radio show, and unapologetically calling him "Boss" during the interview.

=== Involvement in Falwell scandal ===
In 2015, Liberty University president Jerry Falwell Jr. reached out to Cohen and asked him for a personal favor. Falwell had told Cohen that a third party had obtained compromising nude photos of Falwell's wife Becki Falwell. Cohen met with the third party and after the meeting the person destroyed the photos. Shortly after Cohen did this favor for Falwell, Falwell endorsed Trump's 2016 presidential campaign. In August 2020, Cohen told CNN that there was no link between the favor and the endorsement, saying, "There is absolutely no connection between the photos and my personal request to the Falwells to assist the Trump campaign".

=== Payment to Shera Bechard ===
In an April 2018 court proceeding, Cohen said he had given legal advice to only three clients in 2017: Trump, Sean Hannity, and Republican fundraiser Elliott Broidy. The Wall Street Journal reported that Shera Bechard, a former Playboy Playmate, had an affair in 2017 with Broidy, who was married. She became pregnant by him, had an abortion, and was to be paid $1.6 million hush money. Broidy was a deputy finance chairman of the Republican National Committee along with Cohen and DeJoy.

In late 2017, Cohen arranged the $1.6 million payment by Broidy to Bechard as part of an NDA requiring Bechard to keep silent about the matter. Cohen was Broidy's attorney and Keith M. Davidson represented Bechard. Davidson had previously been the attorney for Stormy Daniels and Karen McDougal. The Bechard NDA used the same pseudonyms—David Dennison for the man and Peggy Peterson for the woman—as in the Daniels agreement. The payments were to be made in installments.

On July 6, 2018, Bechard filed a lawsuit against Broidy, Davidson, and Daniels' attorney Michael Avenatti, claiming the three had breached the agreement in relation to the cessation of the settlement payments.

=== Essential Consultants LLC ===
Essential Consultants LLC is a Delaware shell company created by Cohen in October 2016 to facilitate payment of hush money to Stormy Daniels. For many months thereafter, Cohen used the LLC for an array of business activities largely unknown to the public, with at least $4.4 million moving through the LLC between Trump's election to the presidency and January 2018. In May 2018, Daniels' lawyer Michael Avenatti posted a seven-page report to Twitter detailing what he said were financial transactions involving Essential Consultants and Cohen. Avenatti did not reveal the source of his information, which was later largely confirmed by The New York Times and other publications. The data showed that hundreds of thousands of dollars were given to Cohen, via Essential Consultants, from Fortune 500 firms such as Novartis and AT&T, which had business before the Trump administration. It was also revealed that Essential Consultants had received at least $500,000 from a New York-based investment firm called Columbus Nova, which is linked to a Russian oligarch. The firm's largest client is a company controlled by Viktor Vekselberg, a Ukrainian-born Russian oligarch. Vekselberg is a business partner of Soviet-born billionaire and major Republican Party donor, Leonard Blavatnik. A spokesperson for Columbus Nova said that the payment was a consulting fee that had nothing to do with Vekselberg.

Questions were raised about many of the payments, such as four totaling $200,000 that AT&T paid to the LLC between October 2017 and January 2018, while at the same time the proposed merger between the company and Time Warner was pending before the Justice Department. AT&T claimed that the money was paid to the LLC and other firms that were used to provide insights into understanding the new administration, and that the LLC did no legal or lobbying work for AT&T.

On May 11, 2018, the CEO of AT&T stated that in early 2017 it was approached by Cohen to provide "his opinion on the new president and his administration". Cohen was paid $600,000 ($50,000 per month) over the year, which its CEO described as "a big mistake". Novartis was also approached by Cohen and was offered similar services.

Novartis, a Switzerland–based pharmaceutical giant paid the LLC nearly $1.2 million in separate payments. Novartis released a statement May 9, 2018, that it hired the LLC to help the company understand the "health care policy" of the new administration, but it actually did not receive benefit for its investment. The statement continued that Novartis made a decision to not engage Essential Consultants further, but it could not terminate the contract for "cause", raising concerns on why the company did not pursue reimbursement.

Korea Aerospace Industries paid $150,000, ostensibly for advice on "cost accounting standards".

Franklin L. Haney agreed to pay Cohen $10 million if he successfully lobbied for the United States Department of Energy to finance the Bellefonte Nuclear Generating Station, or a reduced fee if the funding targets were only partially met.

== Investigations ==
Cohen v US – Govt Opposition to TRO Request

As of April 2018, Cohen was under federal criminal investigation by the United States Attorney for the Southern District of New York (SDNY).

On April 9, 2018, the FBI raided Cohen's office at the law firm of Squire Patton Boggs, as well as his home and his hotel room in the Loews Regency Hotel in New York City, pursuant to a federal search warrant. The warrant was obtained by the U.S. Attorney's Office for the SDNY, whose public corruption unit was conducting an investigation. Seeking the warrant required high-level approval from the Department of Justice. The Interim U.S. Attorney, Geoffrey Berman, was recused. Deputy Attorney General (AG) Rod Rosenstein and FBI Director Christopher Wray—both of whom are Trump appointees—had supervisory roles. The FBI obtained the warrant after a referral from Robert Mueller's Special Counsel investigation into Russian interference in the 2016 U.S. elections, although underlying reasons for the raid were not revealed. Following the raid, Squire Patton Boggs law firm ended its formal working relationship with Cohen.

Agents seized emails, tax records, business records, and other matter related to several topics, including payments made by Cohen to Stormy Daniels, and records related to Trump's Access Hollywood controversy. Recordings of phone conversations Cohen made were also obtained. According to Daniels' attorney Michael Avenatti and civil rights attorney Lisa Bloom, some of the recordings may have included participants located in California, which would make the recordings illegal, as California is a "two party consent" state.

Since Cohen is an attorney, the search included the seizure of materials normally protected by attorney–client privilege, which is subject to a crime-fraud exception if a crime is suspected. Some legal scholars opined that Trump's denial that he had knowledge of the Daniels payment, combined with denials by Cohen and his lawyer David Schwartz, meant both sides had effectively said that matter did not involve attorney–client communications. Cohen and his lawyers argued that all of the thousands of items seized during the FBI raid should be protected by attorney–client privilege and thus withheld from the prosecutors. U.S. District Judge Kimba M. Wood, appointed a special master, former federal judge Barbara S. Jones, to review all of the seized materials for attorney–client privilege. She found that only 14 of the 639 paper documents were privileged, and out of the 291,770 electronic files seized, only 148 files were withheld from the prosecution. The search warrant itself has been sealed, making it unavailable to the public. The FBI also sought documents pertaining to Cohen's ownership of taxi medallions. Cohen's taxi fleet is operated by Gene Freidman, who is facing legal trouble for alleged tax evasion.

A few days after the raid, McClatchy reported that the Mueller investigation was in possession of evidence that Cohen traveled to Prague in August or September 2016. If true, the report bolsters similar claims in 3 of 17 reports from the Steele dossier. According to McClatchy's confidential sources, Cohen traveled to Prague via Germany, a passage that would not have required use of a passport due to both countries being within the Schengen Area. In reaction, Cohen denied having ever been to Prague, as he had done in his January 2017 denial following the dossier's release. Mother Jones reported that Cohen had told them "I was in Prague for one afternoon 14 years ago," contradicting later statements that he had never visited.

In May 2018, NBC reported that Cohen's phone calls had been monitored by pen register, which logs the origins and destinations of calls but not the contents.

The Wall Street Journal reported on July 26, 2018, that longtime Trump Organization CFO Allen Weisselberg had been subpoenaed to testify before a federal grand jury regarding the Cohen investigation.

=== Conviction on campaign finance, tax evasion, and other charges ===
In August 2018, it was reported that investigators were in the final stages of their investigation. Cohen officially surrendered to the FBI on August 21, 2018. That afternoon, Cohen pleaded guilty to eight criminal charges: five counts of tax evasion; one count of making false statements to a financial institution; one count of willfully causing an unlawful corporate contribution in breach of the Federal Election Campaign Act (FECA) of 1971; and one count of making an excessive campaign contribution at the request of a candidate (Trump) for the "principal purpose of influencing [the] election".

After Cohen's conviction, his personal lawyer Lanny Davis stated that Cohen was ready to "tell everything about Donald Trump that he knows". Davis alluded to Cohen's knowledge that could be used against Trump, and hinted that Cohen had knowledge of whether Trump knew in advance about the computer hacking that was detrimental to Hillary Clinton's presidential campaign, as well as knowledge of the meeting at Trump Tower in June 2016. He later added that he believed Cohen would agree to testify before Congress, even without immunity.

Responding to speculation that President Trump might issue a pardon for Cohen, lawyer Davis said on NPR, "I know that Mr. Cohen would never accept a pardon from a man that he considers to be both corrupt and a dangerous person in the oval office. And [Cohen] has flatly authorized me to say under no circumstances would he accept a pardon from Mr. Trump." In his interview to Sky News, Davis said the turning point for his client's attitude toward Trump was the Helsinki summit in July 2018, which caused him to doubt Trump's loyalty to the U.S.

The New York Times reported on August 22, 2018, that Cohen court documents revealed that two senior Trump Organization executives were also involved in the hush money payments, and that Cohen "coordinated with one or more members of the campaign, including through meetings and phone calls" about the payments.

By mid-October 2018, Cohen had sat for at least 50 hours of interviews with Mueller's investigators and other investigators, although he had no formal cooperation agreement with prosecutors. Cohen also cooperated in a separate investigation by New York State investigators regarding the Trump Organization and Trump Foundation.

On December 12, 2018, U.S. District Judge William H. Pauley III sentenced Cohen to three years in prison and a $50,000 fine, and additionally ordered Cohen to pay $1.4 million in restitution and to forfeit $500,000. At his sentencing hearing, Cohen stated: "I take full responsibility for each act that I pled guilty to: The personal ones to me and those involving the president of the United States of America." Cohen said Trump was "the man that caused me to choose the path of darkness" and do "dirty deeds". Before passing sentence, Judge Pauley said, "each of these crimes is a serious offense against the United States. Mr. Cohen pled guilty to a veritable smorgasbord of fraudulent conduct." In March 2019, Cohen sued the Trump Organization to cover the $1.9 million in financial penalties plus an additional $1.9 million in his unpaid defense costs. Cohen argued that the Trump Organization—which had already paid $1.7 million for his defense—had agreed to indemnify him. Subsequently, more than half of Cohen's outstanding legal bills were paid by the Trump Organization or canceled. A judge dismissed the lawsuit in November 2021, partly on the grounds that Cohen's relevant work had been done for Trump personally rather than for the Trump Organization.

On May 21, 2020, Cohen was released from prison early due to concerns regarding COVID-19, to serve the rest of his sentence under house arrest. On July 2, 2020, Cohen was observed dining at a Manhattan restaurant, and on July 9, 2020, was taken back into federal custody after refusing to agree to conditions of home confinement that included a prohibition on communicating with the media. Cohen filed suit complaining that his re-arrest was an attempt to prevent him from releasing a tell-all book about Trump titled Disloyal: A Memoir. On July 23, a judge found in his favor and ordered that he be returned to home confinement. Cohen was released from home confinement and his sentence expired on November 22, 2021. Immediately following his release, Cohen said he would continue to "provide information testimony documents and my full cooperation on all ongoing investigations to ensure that others are held responsible for their dirty deeds and that no one is ever believed to be above the law". In 2024, Cohen asked to sue Donald Trump for his 2020 re-arrest, which Cohen claimed had been retaliatory.

=== Conviction for perjury in congressional testimony ===
On November 29, 2018, Cohen pleaded guilty to lying to the Senate Intelligence Committee and House Intelligence Committee in 2017 regarding the proposed Trump Tower Moscow deal that he spearheaded in 2015 and 2016. Cohen had told Congress that the deal ceased in January 2016 when it actually ended in June 2016, and that he had not received a response about the deal from the office of a senior Russian official when he actually had. Cohen said that he had given the false testimony in order to be consistent with Trump's "repeated disavowals of commercial and political ties between himself and Russia" and out of loyalty to Trump. Cohen received a two-month sentence, to be served concurrently with his three-year sentence for tax fraud, for the false testimony.

This charge was brought directly by Robert Mueller's investigation, rather than the United States Attorney for the SDNY, who brought the previous charges against Cohen. In a sentencing memorandum filed the following day, Cohen's attorneys stated he kept Trump "apprised" of the "substantive conversation" Cohen had in January 2016 with a Russian official, and discussed with Trump traveling to Russia to advance the project during the summer of 2016. The filing also stated Cohen "remained in close and regular contact with White House-based staff and legal counsel" as he prepared to provide false testimony to Congress.

According to a BuzzFeed report on January 17, 2019, which cited anonymous sources and which CNN was not able to corroborate, Trump personally directed Cohen to lie to Congress about the Trump Tower Moscow project. A spokesperson for Trump denied the Buzzfeed allegations. A spokesman for the Special Counsel investigation took the unusual step of issuing a rebuttal which stated: "BuzzFeed’s description of specific statements to the Special Counsel’s Office, and characterization of documents and testimony obtained by this office, regarding Michael Cohen’s Congressional testimony are not accurate." CNN reporters responded by stating: "The special counsel’s office did not go into detail about which parts of the BuzzFeed story they were calling untrue. The BuzzFeed story made several other claims that remain uncorroborated by other media outlets regarding Cohen’s lies to Congress and communications with Mueller."

On February 26, 2019, Cohen was officially disbarred by the New York Supreme Court, Appellate Division.

=== Defamation lawsuit ===
In 2018, Stormy Daniels sued Cohen for defamation, citing a statement he made to the media in which he said "Just because something isn't true doesn't mean that it can't cause you harm or damage." Daniels's lawsuit alleged that Cohen's comments were meant to convey that Daniels was a liar about her relationship with Trump, and that the lie caused Trump harm. The case was dismissed in 2019.

=== Prison and house arrest ===
Cohen's petition against Barr for a writ of habeas corpus

Cohen's declaration that his incarceration violated his First Amendment rights

Cohen reported to FCI Otisville, on May 6, 2019. He was released from prison early on May 21, 2020, due to concerns regarding COVID-19, in order to serve the rest of his sentence under house arrest.

On July 2, 2020, Cohen was photographed dining at a Manhattan restaurant, which according to his lawyer Lanny Davis was not a violation of his prison furlough since he had not yet transitioned to house arrest. A week later, he was taken back into custody after federal officials asserted he had refused to sign an agreement stipulating that he would have no engagement of any kind with the media—including publishing his "tell-all" book—for the remainder of his sentence, which encompassed the November 2020 elections. The previous week he had announced on Twitter that he anticipated releasing a book on his experiences working for Trump in late September 2020. He also tweeted on June 26 that a recent New York Times article entitled "Inside Barr's Effort to Undermine Prosecutors in N.Y." had revealed "only a part of the full story," using the hashtag #WillSpeakSoon. After being sent to the Metropolitan Detention Center in Brooklyn, he was returned to FCI Otisville and held in solitary confinement 23 hours each day, which prevented him from working on his manuscript on prison library computers. Cohen denied he refused to sign the agreement, asserting his attorney had simply asked questions about it, at which point US marshals escorted him back to prison.

On July 20, 2020, Cohen filed suit against AG Bill Barr and two federal prison officials, asserting his First Amendment rights were being violated. Cohen claimed his return to prison was retaliation "because he is drafting a book manuscript that is critical of the President of the United States". Cohen requested he be immediately released to home confinement. The government denied on July 22 that Cohen had been re-imprisoned in an effort to block publication of his book. On July 23, U.S. District Judge Alvin K. Hellerstein ordered Cohen be returned to home confinement because the government had retaliated against him and violated his First Amendment rights. Hellerstein said Cohen would be released to home confinement on July 24. Hellerstein remarked, "I've never seen such a clause in 21 years of being a judge and sentencing people and looking at terms of supervised release." One week later, the government informed Hellerstein it would not challenge his ruling and would remove the restrictive clause from Cohen's home-confinement agreement.

Cohen was released from FCI Otisville on July 24, 2020. Days later, Cohen's attorney informed Hellerstein that Cohen hoped to accept a job offer with an unnamed political action committee to consult and make media appearances on its behalf.

Cohen was released from house arrest on November 22, 2021.

=== In New York ===
The Manhattan district attorney (DA) and the New York AG opened investigations into Trump. The Manhattan DA's office decided in 2022 not to pursue charges, in part because the new DA, Alvin Bragg, worried that the case relied too much on Cohen's testimony. Investigators at the Manhattan DA's office continued to speak to Cohen, interviewing him 15 times by February 2023.

These were separate from the investigation by the New York State Department of Taxation and Finance which, on August 22, 2018, announced it had subpoenaed Cohen in connection with its investigation into whether the Donald J. Trump Foundation had violated New York tax laws. The department also said in October 2018 it would review allegations that Trump had evaded gift taxes in his inheritance of hundreds of millions of dollars from his father.

=== By the US Congress ===
On January 10, 2019, Cohen agreed to testify publicly before the House Oversight Committee to give a "full and credible account" of his work on behalf of Trump. On January 12, Fox News contributor and legal analyst Jeanine Pirro took a 20-minute, on-air phone call from Trump in which he claimed Cohen had fabricated stories to reduce the length of his expected sentence. Trump suggested that investigations should instead focus on Cohen's father-in-law, saying "that's the one people want to look at". The father-in-law, Fima Shusterman, owned condos both at Trump Tower and in a Trump development near Miami. According to former federal investigators, Shusterman introduced Trump to Cohen. On several subsequent occasions Trump hinted publicly that Shusterman, or possibly Cohen's wife, could be tied to criminal activity. On January 20, Trump's attorney Rudy Giuliani suggested on CNN that Shusterman "may have ties to something called organized crime".

On January 23, Cohen announced through his attorney that he would postpone his testimony to a later date, citing "ongoing threats against his family from President Trump" and Giuliani. Some legal analysts asserted that these comments by Trump and Giuliani constituted intimidation and witness tampering. House Oversight Committee chairman Elijah Cummings and House Intelligence Committee chairman Adam Schiff said that threatening a witness's family is "textbook mob tactics".

After several scheduling delays, Cohen testified before three congressional committees in late February 2019. First was a February 26 closed-door hearing before the Senate Intelligence Committee. He testified for more than seven hours.

Also on February 26, Florida Republican Congressman Matt Gaetz directly threatened Cohen via Twitter, hinting about unspecified disclosures to Cohen's wife and father-in-law. The Florida Bar Association investigated the incident, but only issued a "letter of advice".

On February 27, Cohen gave 10 hours of public, televised testimony before the House Oversight Committee, during which he described Trump as a "racist," a "con man", and a "cheat", and expressed remorse and shame for the things he had done for Trump. He said the president had reimbursed him for illegal hush money payments, suggested that he should lie to Congress and the public about the Trump Tower Moscow negotiations, and filed false financial statements with banks and insurance companies. Republicans hammered on his previous false testimony, asking why he should be believed now.

On February 28, Cohen testified behind closed doors to the House Intelligence Committee for more than seven hours. Cohen returned to that committee for more questioning on March 6.

In April 2019, Cohen said he had found a hard drive with 14 million documents, many of which were personal, but some of which might be relevant to the charges. Cohen later said: "It took 26 people to go through my 14 million documents, literally round the clock, because the judge demanded that we have it done within 45 days."

== Disloyal: A Memoir ==
Cohen's memoir on Trump, Disloyal: A Memoir, was released in September 2020. In the foreword, Cohen characterizes Trump as "a cheat, a mobster, a liar, a fraud, a bully, a racist, a predator, a con man".

== Personal life ==
Cohen married Ukrainian-born Laura Shusterman in 1994. They have a daughter, Samantha, and a son, Jake. Shusterman's father, Fima Shusterman, left Soviet Ukraine for New York in 1975. He was the person who introduced Cohen to Trump, according to a Trump biographer.

Cohen has been friends since childhood with Felix Sater, a Moscow-born real estate developer with links to the Russian mafia and a convicted felon. Both men worked together on the Trump Tower Moscow deal.

Cohen served as chairman of the board of directors of Columbia Grammar & Preparatory School through late 2016.

Before joining the Trump Organization, Cohen had purchased several homes in Trump's buildings. A 2017 New York Times article reported that Cohen is known for having "a penchant for luxury"; he was married at The Pierre luxury hotel, drove a Porsche while attending college, and once owned a Bentley.

In January 2019 documents that were released after the prosecution of former police officer Paul Dean revealed that Cohen, Donald Trump, Donald Trump Jr., and others had obtained handgun carry permits after making donations to the Police Athletic League or the New York City Police Foundation despite not having the proper credentials on file. Cohen lawyer Lanny Davis did not comment on the allegations against Cohen.

Cohen hosted the podcasts Mea Culpa and Political Beatdown. These were once part of the MeidasTouch Network, but MeidasTouch fired him and quit producing his podcasts on January 17, 2026.

== In popular culture ==
As the Mueller investigation concerning Trump was in the daily news headlines, it became fodder for parody on Saturday Night Live, with Cohen being portrayed by Ben Stiller and Trump by Alec Baldwin.

== See also ==
- Legal teams involved in the Mueller special counsel investigation
- Walt Nauta, butler and body man to Trump; indicted by a federal grand jury and charged with eight counts of federal crimes
- Allen Weisselberg, former CFO of the Trump Organization; pleaded guilty to 15 criminal charges and served a five-month jail sentence
