= David Schwartz (lawyer) =

American lawyer

- Born: August 6, 1967 (age 59); New York City, U.S.
- Education: Tulane University
- Occupation: Attorney
- Website: Official Gerstman Schwartz & Malito page

David Schwartz (born August 6, 1967 in Brooklyn, New York City) is an American criminal defense attorney, lobbyist, and former prosecutor from New York. Schwartz was partner at Gerstman Schwartz & Malito, a boutique law firm in New York City. Schwartz was the attorney and media spokesperson representing Michael Cohen in the Stormy Daniels–Donald Trump scandal. Schwartz is now President of lobbying firm Gotham Government Relations.

== Career ==
Schwartz currently practices law, lobbying (government relations) with his appearances in the United States Supreme Court, United States District Court of New York, United States Tax Court, New York State Supreme Court, New York City Criminal and Civil Court, and Nassau County District Court. He is also a member of the Forbes New York Business Council and appears in the media to comment on legal issues and represents parties in notable lawsuits.

During his career, Schwartz represented several defendants in high-profile cases including the rape trial of Nicki Minaj's brother and the Yellow Cab, New York taxi medallions owners and Uber.

The New York State Senate appointed Schwartz as a member of its commission on judicial nomination of Justices to the New York Court of Appeals. He also served as a trustee of the Brooklyn Bar Association. Schwartz practiced law as a litigator, a lobbyist and advocate of businesses, trade associations, not-for-profits and individuals during the past decades. He served the People of the State of New York as an Assistant District Attorney in Kings County from 1993 to 1997. In this position, Schwartz handled hundreds of criminal prosecutions.

=== Stormy Daniels−Donald Trump scandal ===
During the Stormy Daniels-Trump story, Schwartz acted as Cohen's attorney and representative in the media. For example, Schwartz had on March 19, 2018, a heated discussion on CNN with Stormy Daniel's attorney Michael Avenatti about a contested non disclosure agreement.
