= David Schwartzman (economist) =

Canadian-born American economist (1924–2019)

David Schwartzman (April 22, 1924 – March 28, 2019) was a Canadian-born American economist.

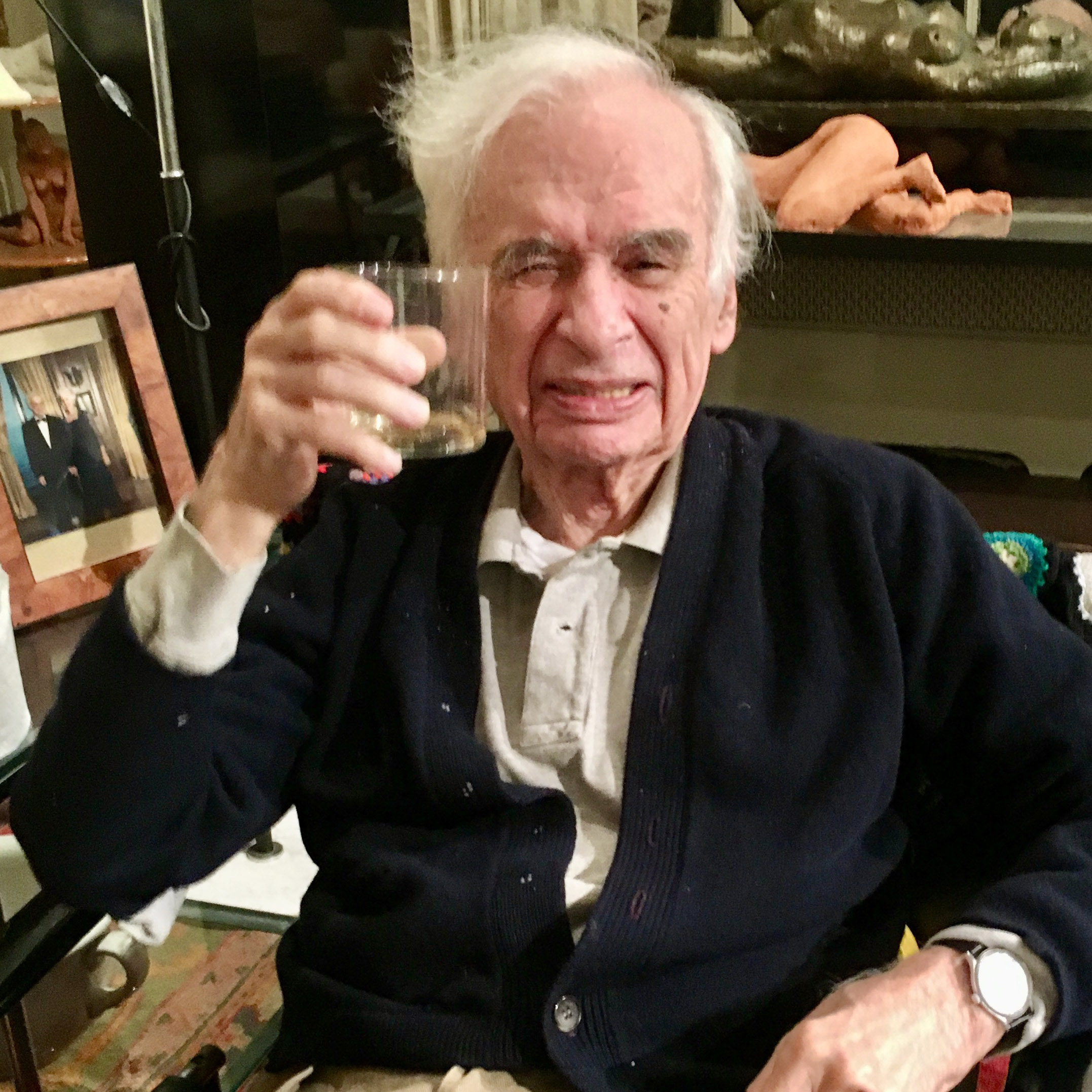
David Schwartzman at his home

== Education and career ==
Born in Montreal to a Canadian father and American mother, Schwartzman's first public role was as a national youth organizer for the Co-operative Commonwealth Federation (CCF). Schwartzman received his BA from McGill University, Canada in 1945, and spent the 1945–1946 academic year studying under Milton Friedman and George Stigler at the University of Minnesota. His classmates included participants in the Minnesota Starvation Experiment, including Max Kampelman, whom he recalled as emaciated. He earned his PhD from UC Berkeley, USA in 1953. He held many teaching positions in economics: Lecturer at McGill (1948–1951); Instructor at Columbia (1954–1958); Assistant Professor at New York University (1958–1960), and Professor at the New School for Social Research (1960–1964), where he attained emeritus status in 2002.

== Contributions ==
Schwartzman made contributions to the discipline of Industrial Organization (IO). A standard textbook on IO has testified to his contribution in several places. His core contributions are in the areas Economic Concentration—Regionally and locally, Uncertainty and the Size of Firms, The Burden of Monopoly, Black Unemployment, Rate of Returns in the Pharmaceutical Industry, and the Decline in the Retail and Service Industry. We present some analyses of his contributions as reviewed by others in academic journals.

According to Billy R. Dickson, Schwartzman thesis in his book on "Black Unemployment" is based on the microeconomic model of substitution. Here the notion is substitution of factor prices, namely the relative price changes from unskilled labor to skilled labor demand. This analysis was carried out with labor-saving technologies as an instrumental variable.

Sam Peltzman has analyzed Schwartzman's hypothesis that the return in the pharmaceutical industry was declining from better rates in the 1950s and 1960s. The underlying cause for the decline included mainly the increase in regulation through the 1962 Amendments to the Food, Drug and Cosmetics Act.

Ramrattan and Szenberg analyzed Schwartzman's analyses of trends in the Retail and Service industries (1969; 1971). The study puts into perspective growth and decline in the book industries. Of importance was slow employment growth, which was a quarter of a percent annually from 1929 to 1958, and one percent from 1958 to 1963.

== Some of His Works ==
- Schwartzman, David. (1997). Black Unemployment: part of unskilled unemployment. Wesport, Conn.: Greenwood Press.
- Schwartzman, David. (1988). Games of Chicken - Four Decades of U.S. Nuclear Policy. New York: Praeger Publishers, 248 pages. ISBN 0-275-92884-5.
- Schwartzman, David. (1976). Innovation in the Pharmaceutical Industry. Baltimore, MD: Johns Hopkins University Press.
- Schwartzman, David, (1971). The Decline of Service in Retail Trade: An Analysis of the Growth of Sales per Man-Hour, 1919–1963. Pullman, WA: Washington State University Press.
- Schwartzman, David and Joan Bodoff, (1971). "Concentration in Regional and Local Industries," Southern Economic Journal, Vol. 37 (January), pp. 343–348.
- Schwartzman, David. (1969). Production and Productivity in the Service Industries, in Victor R. Fuchs, ed. Studies in Income and Wealth, NBER Conference on Research in Income and Wealth, 34, 201–230.
- Schwartzman, David. (1963). "Uncertainty and the Size of Firms," Economica, Vol 30 (August), pp. 287–269.
- Schwartzman, David. (1960). "The Burden of Monopoly," Journal of Political Economy, vol. 33 (June), pp. 627–630.
- Schwartzman, David. (1959). "The Effect of Monopoly on Price," Journal of Political Economy, Vol. 67 (Aug), pp. 352–362
