= Scandal (disambiguation) =

A scandal is a strong social reaction to a disgraceful or discreditable action, circumstance, etc.

Scandal or The Scandal may also refer to:

== Arts, entertainment, and media ==
- Scandal Savage, a DC Comics villain

=== Films ===
- Scandal (1917 film), an American film starring Constance Talmadge
- Scandal (1929 film), an American drama film
- Scandal (1948 film), a French mystery crime thriller film
- Scandal (1950 film), called in Japanese Shubun
- Scandal (1989 film), a British film about the Profumo affair
- Scandal (2012 film), called in Vietnamese Bí Mật Thảm Đỏ
- Le Scandale (1934 film), French film
- The Scandal (1923 film), British film by Arthur Rooke
- The Scandal (1943 film), Spanish film
- Scandal (2021 film), Indonesian film
- George White's Scandals (1934 film), American film
- George White's Scandals (1945 film), American film

=== Literature ===
- The Scandal (novel), an 1875 novel by Pedro Antonio de Alarcón
- "Scandal" (short story), a 1919 short story by Willa Cather
- Scandal (Endō novel), by Shusaku Endo
- Scandal (Wilson novel), by A. N. Wilson
- Scandal: How "Gotcha" Politics Is Destroying America, a 2006 book by Lanny Davis

=== Music ===
- Scandal (Australian band), a 1970s Australian rock/pop band
- Scandal (American band), a 1980s American rock/pop band
- Scandal (Japanese band), a Japanese pop-rock group
- Scandal (EP), a 1982 EP by the American band Scandal
- Scandal (Kangta & Vanness album), 2006, or the title track
- Scandal (Yōko Oginome album), 1994
- "Scandal" (song), a song by Queen from their 1989 album The Miracle

=== Television ===
- Scandal (TV series), a 2012 American television series
- Scandal!, a South African television soap opera
- The Scandal (2013 TV series), a 2013 South Korean television series
- The Scandal (2026 TV series), an upcoming 2026 South Korean television series

== Other uses ==
- Scandal (theology), an act that leads someone else to sin
- Scandals (gay bar), Portland, Oregon, U.S.
- Sex scandal, or just scandal
- Solar Wings Scandal, a British hang glider design
- Speciated by cancer development animals, a hypothesis concerning the development of Myxosporea (and potentially other parasites) from transmissible cancers

== See also ==
- Scandalous (disambiguation)
- Scandale (disambiguation)
