= Vinoo Varghese =

American lawyer

- Education: New York University (B.A.), Brooklyn Law School (J.D.)
- Occupations: Criminal Defense Attorney, Legal Commentator
- Years active: 2000-present
- Employer(s): Varghese & Associates, P.C.
- Website: https://vargheselaw.com/

Vinoo Varghese is an American criminal defense attorney and legal commentator based in New York City. After beginning his career in 2000 as a prosecutor in the Brooklyn District Attorney's Office, where he ran the unit that prosecuted attempted murders of police officers, he founded Varghese & Associates, P.C., a white-collar and criminal defense firm on Wall Street, in 2006. He has represented clients in New York State and federal courts in cases involving insider trading, public corruption, tax fraud, pandemic loan fraud and firearms charges.

Varghese’s clients have included Rengan Rajaratnam, the younger brother of Galleon Group founder Raj Rajaratnam, and former New York City Councilman Dan Halloran, whose 2014 corruption trial ended in a mistrial after Varghese’s cross-examination of an FBI agent revealed recordings the government had not turned over to the defense. In a federal tax case, he won a rare order for a new trial for construction company owner Tomas Olazabal, who was acquited at retrial. In 2021, he petitioned the Supreme Court of the United States on behalf on New York City public school teachers challenging the city’s COVID-19 vaccine mandate. He later represented Dexter Taylor, a Brooklyn man sentenced to 10 years in prison for building and possessing homemade firearms, arguing that the conviction violated Taylor's constitutional rights under the Second Amendment.

Varghese is a frequent legal commentator on television, appearing on CBS News, Fox News, MSNBC, CNN and the BBC, including on programs such as Hardball with Chris Matthews,The Ingraham Angle, Tucker Carlson Tonight, The Situation Room with Wolf Blitzer, and CBS This Morning.. He has been quoted by The New York Times, The Wall Street Journal, the New York Law Journal, The Christian Science Monitor and Law360.

He has written op-eds for the New York Law Journal, the New York Post, and the New York Daily News, often criticizing the scope of prosecutorial power. He has taught trial advocacy at Harvard Law School and Cardozo School of Law. In 2014, the New York Law Journal recognized Varghese as a “Rising Star.”

In November 2026, Varghese was included in Famous NYU Lawyers, a guide to notable New York University alumni in the legal profession published by NYU Alumni Stories. The guide features House Democratic Leader Hakeem Jeffries, former New York City Mayor Rudy Giuliani, corporate lawyer Martin Lipton, civil rights lawyer Sherrilyn Ifill, and former U.S. Attorney Zachary W. Carter. Varghese is one of 17 lawyers featured and the only one who didn't attend NYU Law School.

In 2026, his firm, Varghese & Associates, was ranked in Chambers USA: Spotlight for White-Collar Crime & Government Investigations in New York.

== Early Life and Education ==
Varghese’s father was a taxi driver, and his mother was a nurse. As a student, he learned martial arts to defend himself against bullies. He graduated from Chaminade High School and attended New York University (NYU) on the Thomas Sweeney scholarship, a need-based academic scholarship. At NYU, he was a resident assistant, president of the South Asian Student Association, and a University Scholar. Varghese graduated from NYU's College of Arts and Science in January 1996 with a B.A. in philosophy. The first member of his family to attend law school in the United States, he earned his Juris Doctor (J.D.) from Brooklyn Law School in 2000.

== Career ==
After graduating from law school in 2000, Varghese began his legal career as a prosecutor with the Brooklyn District Attorney's Office, where he worked in the trial bureaus, investigations, and appeals. His last position there was running the Assault on Police Officer Program, a unit which prosecuted attempted murders of NYPD officers. In February 2006, he founded Varghese & Associates, P.C., a white-collar and criminal defense firm located on Wall Street.

Varghese has defended multiple high-profile clients. In 2013, Varghese represented Rengan Rajaratnam, the younger brother of Galleon hedge fund founder, Raj Rajaratnam, on insider trading charges.

In 2014, Varghese defended New York City Councilman Daniel Halloran who was described by then U.S. Attorney Preet Bharara as the “quarterback” of a scheme to put a Democrat, Malcolm Smith on the Republican ticket for New York City Mayor.[2] Varghese later criticized Bharara for his pretrial comments to The New York Times. During the trial, the New York Times noted that Varghese's cross-examination of an FBI agent led to a mistrial. During the cross, the agent admitted there were multiple recordings of an informant the government hadn't turned over to the defense. This led to multiple mistrial motions, which Southern District Judge Kenneth M. Karas ultimately granted.

From 2009 to 2015, Varghese represented Tomas Olazabal, a construction company owner charged with tax fraud by the Department of Justice’s Tax Division. After Olazabal was convicted at his first trial, Varghese moved for a new trial under Rule 33 of the Federal Rules of Criminal Procedure, a rarely granted form of relief, and Judge Brian Cogan of the Eastern District of New York granted that motion. The government appealed to the United States Court of Appeals for the Second Circuit, where Varghese defeated the appeal. When the Tax Division retried the case, Varghese won a full acquittal for Olazabal.

In 2019, Varghese represented Christopher Gooley, a juror on the Chanel Lewis murder retrial in Queens. Lewis, a young black man with a history of mental illness was convicted in a retrial of murdering young Italian American jogger, Karina Vetrano. The case garnered international attention due to the racial optics of the case and Lewis’ mental state. Gooley, shortly after voting guilty spoke with reporters and told them that he was unsure about his verdict and accused the other white jurors of allowing race and other factors to influence their guilty verdict.

On September 30, 2021, Varghese filed an emergency request to the Supreme Court of the United States on behalf of New York City public school teachers challenging Mayor Bill de Blasio's COVID-19 vaccine mandate for Department of Education employees, which did not offer a weekly-testing alternative. The Supreme Court application garnered the attention of many national news outlets such as CNN, ABC, USA Today, Bloomberg, The Wall Street Journal, The New York Times, Insider, NPR, and The Hill. Justice Sonia Sotomayor denied the emergency application on October 1, 2021. Varghese then filed a petition for a writ of certiorari on the teachers' behalf, which the Supreme Court denied on April 18, 2022.

In 2024, Varghese represented Dexter Taylor, a Brooklyn man charged with building and possessing homemade firearms, often called “ghost guns”. A jury convicted Taylor in April 2024, and he was sentenced to 10 years in prison the following month. Varghese argued that the conviction violated Taylor’s Second Amendment right to keep firearms in his home and said he planned to continue challenging the government in federal court. Gothamist quoted Varghese saying that they were appealing the conviction and were prepared to go all the way to the U.S. Supreme Court. “He felt what he was doing was completely proper, because the supreme law of the land is the United States Constitution, which guarantees an individual right to bear arms,” said Varghese, “He wasn’t firing them. He wasn’t using them. He wasn’t selling them or even trying to.”

Varghese represented Sandeep Grover, a Long Island tax preparer charged by federal prosecutors in Manhattan in 2023 with fraud involving COVID-19 Paycheck Protection Program loans. After Grover pleaded guilty in March 2025, he faced a potential sentence of more than 12 years in prison. Varghese argued for a sentence well below the federal sentencing guidelines. In August 2025, Judge Analisa Torres of the Southern District of New York sentenced Grover to 18 months in prison. At sentencing, Judge Torres noted that more than 35 people, including elected officials, had written letters in support of Grover.

== Recognition ==
In 2014, the New York Law Journal named Varghese one of its "Rising Stars," an annual recognition of New York lawyers aged 40 and under. He was one of 42 attorneys selected that year from more than 230 nominees, chosen for their records of accomplishment and their contributions to the practice of law and their communities.

In 2026, he was included in “Famous NYU Lawyers,” a guide published by NYU Alumni Stories that highlights notable NYU alumni across the legal profession. The guide features Varghese in its section on prosecution and criminal defense, alongside former U.S. Attorney Zachary Carter. It describes him as a former Brooklyn prosecutor who has run his own Wall Street defense firm since 2006 and appears regularly as a legal commentator on national television.

In November 2026, Varghese & Associates was ranked in the Chambers USA: Spotlight 2027 guide for White-Collar Crime & Government Investigations in New York, its first year in the rankings. Chambers describes the firms ranked in this category as representing companies and individuals before the U.S. Department of Justice and U.S. Attorneys’ Offices in investigations, enforcement proceedings, and white-collar criminal trials and appeals. Varghese has described his approach as different among white-collar defense lawyers: his clients rarely cooperate with the government, and he instead requires prosecutors to prove their cases. He has attributed the approach in part to his background as a prosecutor.

== Media appearances ==
Varghese is a regular legal commentator on news networks including CBS News, Fox Business, Fox News, CNN, MSNBC, Court TV, BBC, i24, TRT World, CTV, HLN, and The Today Show Australia. Varghese guest hosted on Vanity Fair's True Crime series, reviewing the legal accuracy of financial crime scenes in films and television series, including The Wolf of Wall Street to Billions. Varghese appeared on Inside Edition to comment on the criminal exposure of the photographer who surreptitiously took a picture of Alex Rodriguez on his toilet in his Manhattan high-rise. Varghese was also featured on Nancy Grace's show, Crime Stories, where he commented on the disappearance and murder of Rebecca Hoover. Varghese has also commented on the 2020 presidential election on Arabic-language news network, Sky News Arabia. He has also been quoted in print by outlets including The New York Times, The Wall Street Journal, the New York Law Journal, The Christian Science Monitor, and Law360.

In June 2021, Varghese was the sole sponsor of the 77 WABC Manhattan district attorney debate, hosted by Dominic Carter, and featuring candidates Alvin Bragg, Eliza Orlins, Tali Farhadian Weinstein, Elizabeth Crotty, Dan Quart, Diana Florence, Lucy Lang, and Tahanie Aboushi.

Following the debate, Varghese was asked to join Rudy Giuliani on his show to discuss both of their prosecutorial careers, the Derek Chauvin trial, and the suspension of Giuliani's New York law license over statements he made about the 2020 election while representing Donald Trump. Varghese also appeared on Cats at Night, the show hosted by billionaire owner of 77 WABC Radio, John Catsimatidis. Former New York Governor George Pataki, and Lidia Curanaj also joined the discussion. They discussed prosecutorial abuse and ways that prosecutors can be held accountable for their actions. In partnership with 77 WABC Radio NY, Varghese helped launched a radio series called Legal Minute with Vinoo Varghese. Legal Minute breaks down legal issues and relevant news topics in 60-seconds or less with the mission to educate and inform listeners about these issues.

In October 2024, Varghese provided legal commentary to Gothamist ahead of the manslaughter trial of Daniel Penny, a former Marine charged in the chokehold death of Jordan Neely on a New York City subway train. Varghese predicted that prosecutors would emphasize Penny's military training to argue that he should have known that the chokehold could be fatal, and that the defense would try to seat jurors who could identify with subway riders who felt unsafe. He said winning over a Manhattan jury would be difficult for Penny, but added, "I think people are fed up with what they have to deal with on the subway." Penny was acquitted in December 2024.

== Op-eds ==
Varghese has written op-eds for the New York Law Journal, the New York Daily News, and the New York Post. In a 2017 Post op-ed, he argued that O. J. Simpson should remain in prison. On March 21, 2020, the Daily News published his op-ed criticizing Governor Andrew Cuomo's omission of criminal defense lawyers from the "essential" workers in the state's COVID-19 shutdown order. Fox News interviewed him about the op-ed. In June 2020, he argued in the New York Law Journal that Derek Chauvin must receive a fair trial to ensure justice for George Floyd.

Varghese has written op-eds for the New York Law Journal, the New York Daily News, and the New York Post. In a July 2017 New York Post op-ed, written after the Nevada parole board voted to release O. J. Simpson from his sentence for a 2007 armed robbery in Las Vegas, Varghese argued that Simpson should remain in prison because he posed a continuing danger to society. He contended that the board should have considered Simpson's violent history, including the evidence from his 1995 murder trial, the civil judgment finding him liable for the deaths, and his admitted abuse of his wife, as well as what Varghese saw as Simpson's lack of remorse at the parole hearing. On March 21, 2020, the Daily News published his op-ed criticizing Governor Andrew Cuomo's Executive Order 202.6, which did not list criminal defense lawyers among the “essential” workers exempt from the state's COVID-19 shutdown. Varghese argued that the order failed to protect lawyers representing people accused of crimes. In March 2021, Varghese wrote an op-ed titled “Don’t Let Cuomo’s #MeToo Moment Distract from his Impeachable Offenses.” He argued that New Yorkers should focus more on Cuomo's policy of admitting COVID-19-positive patients to nursing homes than on the sexual harassment allegations against him.The following day, the state's guidance was updated to include criminal defense lawyers, and Fox News interviewed Varghese about the op-ed on March 26, 2020.

On May 29, 2020, he wrote a New York Law Journal op-ed arguing that the Manhattan District Attorney's Office had engaged in selective prosecution by charging Yasmin Seweid with filing a false report in 2016 while not charging Amy Cooper over the Central Park birdwatching incident. The office charged Cooper with filing a false report in July 2020.

In a June 2020 New York Law Journal op-ed titled "To Ensure Justice for George Floyd, Derek Chauvin Must Get a Fair Trial," Varghese contrasted the swift charges against Minneapolis police officer Derek Chauvin with the handling of Eric Garner's death, in which the NYPD officer was never charged. In a Fox News interview that month, after Minnesota Attorney General Keith Ellison added a second-degree murder charge against Chauvin, Varghese said the officer in Garner's case should have been charged, but argued that Chauvin and the three other officers charged in Floyd's death still deserved fair trials. He also said the autopsy findings could lead to an acquittal on the murder charges.

== Work in the community ==
Varghese served as president of Chaminade High School's Alumni Lawyers Association from September 2017 through August 2019. He has also served as an alumni mentor to New York University's College of Arts and Science students since 2014 and has employed undergraduates as legal assistants and paralegals at his firm. He has taught clinical students from Brooklyn Law School and Hofstra School of Law. From 2019 to 2024, he taught trial advocacy at Harvard Law School, and he has also taught trial advocacy at Cardozo Law School and for the New York City Law Department. He has lectured at Parsons School of Design.
