= 2021 Manhattan District Attorney election =

- November 2, 2021
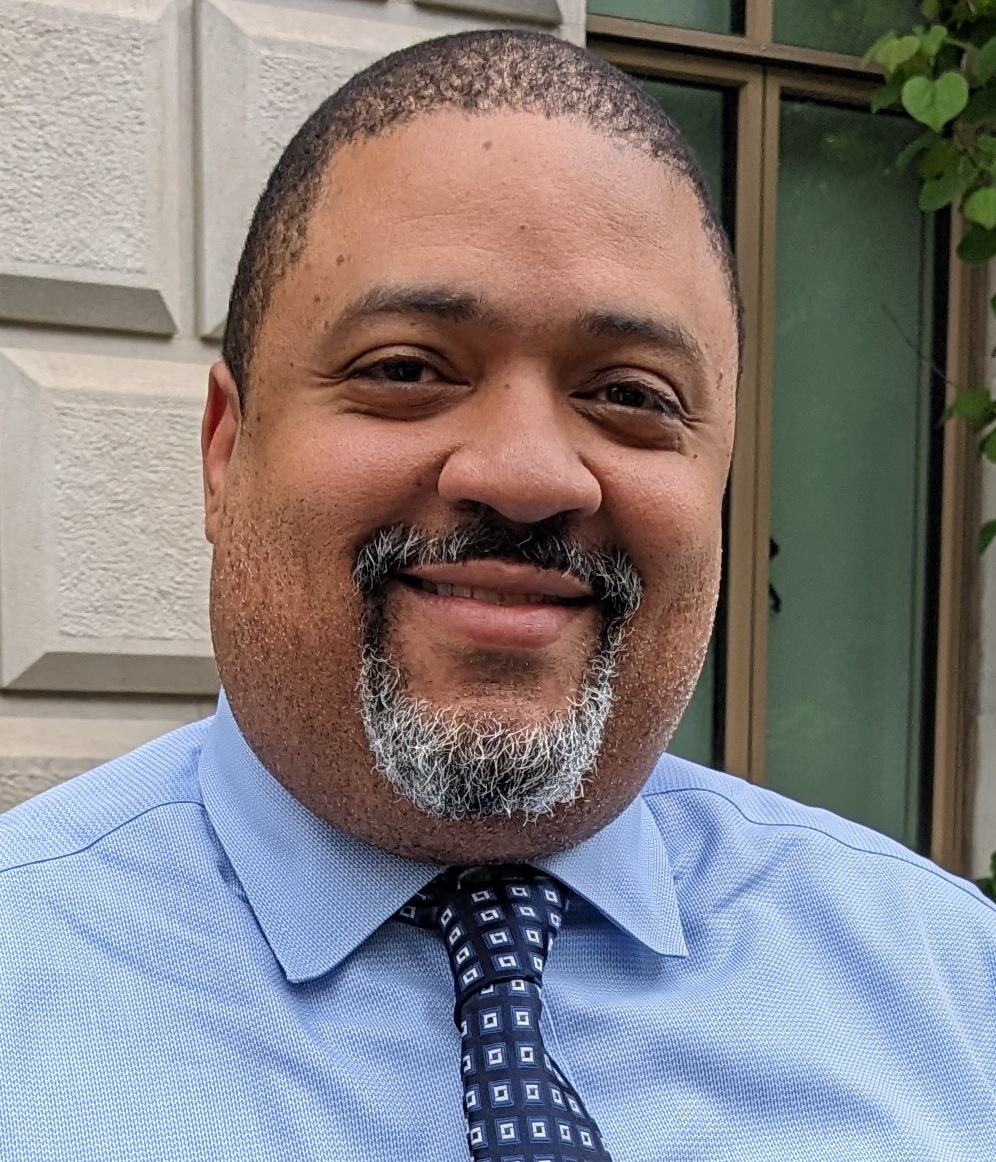

Candidate	Alvin Bragg	Thomas Kenniff
Party	Democratic	Republican
Popular vote	211,686	41,211
Percentage	83.6%	16.3%
- Bragg: 50–60% 60–70% 70–80% 80–90% >90% Kenniff: 50–60% Tie: 50% No votes
District Attorney before election
Cyrus Vance Jr.
Democratic
Elected District Attorney
Alvin Bragg
Democratic

The 2021 Manhattan District Attorney election was held on November 2, 2021, to elect the Manhattan District Attorney. The incumbent, Cyrus Vance Jr., had announced in March 2021 that he would not seek a fourth term.

The Democratic primary election was held on June 22, 2021. Despite the introduction of ranked-choice voting for other elected positions in New York City, this race used plurality voting, as it is a state position, rather than a city position.

A key issue in the election was which candidate would be best equipped to criminally prosecute or civilly sue former President Donald Trump.

== Democratic primary ==
=== Candidates ===
==== Nominee ====
- Alvin Bragg, former New York State chief deputy attorney general and former federal prosecutor

==== Eliminated in primary ====
- Tahanie Aboushi, civil rights attorney
- Liz Crotty, former assistant district attorney for Manhattan
- Tali Farhadian Weinstein, former federal prosecutor
- Diana Florence, former prosecutor for the Manhattan attorneygGeneral's office
- Lucy Lang, former assistant attorney general for Manhattan
- Eliza Orlins, public defender, former contestant on Survivor and The Amazing Race
- Dan Quart, New York State Assemblymember for the 73rd district (2011–present)

==== Withdrawn ====
- Janos Marton, civil rights attorney (endorsed Bragg)

=== Endorsements ===
Endorsements
Tahanie Aboushi

U.S. senators

- Bernie Sanders, U.S. Senator from Vermont since 2007

U.S. representatives

- Jamaal Bowman, U.S. Representative for New York's 16th congressional district since 2021
- Rashida Tlaib, U.S. Representative for Michigan's 13th congressional district since 2019

Local officials

- Justin Brannan, member of the New York City Council from the 43rd district since 2018
- Jumaane Williams, New York City Public Advocate since 2019

State senators

- Jabari Brisport, member of the New York State Senate from the 25th district since 2019
- Jessica Ramos, member of the New York State Senate from the 13th district since 2019
- Gustavo Rivera, member of the New York State Senate from the 33rd district since 2011

State assemblymembers

- Zohran Mamdani, member of the New York State Assembly from the 36th district since 2021
- Marcela Mitaynes, member of the New York State Assembly from the 51st district since 2021
- Yuh-Line Niou, member of the New York State Assembly from the 65th district since 2017

Individuals

- Abdul El-Sayed, candidate for governor of Michigan in 2018
- Snoop Dogg, rapper
- Melissa Mark-Viverito, former Speaker of the New York City Council
- Cynthia Nixon, actress and activist, candidate for governor of New York in 2018
- Linda Sarsour, civil rights activist

Organizations

- Citizen Action of New York
- Jim Owles Liberal Democratic Club
- The Jewish Vote
- Real Justice PAC
- Moms Demand Action
- Our Revolution
- Progressive Change Campaign Committee (second choice)
- Working Families Party

Labor unions

- District Council 37
- UNITE HERE Local 100
Alvin Bragg

Federal legislators

- Gregory Meeks, U.S. Representative for New York's 5th congressional district since 1998
- Jerry Nadler, U.S. Representative for New York's 10th congressional district since 1992

State senators

- Robert Jackson, member of the New York State Senate from the 31st district since 2019

State assemblymembers

- Inez Dickens, member of the New York State Assembly from the 70th district since 2021
- Al Taylor, member of the New York State Assembly from the 71st district since 2021

Individuals

- Harry Belafonte, singer and activist
- Preet Bharara, former U.S. Attorney for the Southern District of New York
- Gwen Carr, activist and mother of Eric Garner
- Hazel Dukes, former national president of the NAACP
- C. Virginia Fields, former Manhattan Borough President
- Dan Garodnick, former New York City Councilmember
- Dan Goldman, former assistant U.S. Attorney for the Southern District of New York (2007–2017), former general counsel for the U.S. House Intelligence Committee (2019–2020)
- Renée Elise Goldsberry, actress and singer/songwriter
- Elizabeth Holtzman, former New York City Comptroller, former Brooklyn District Attorney, former U.S. Representative for New York's 16th congressional district
- John Legend, singer
- Antron McCray, member of the Central Park Five
- Peter Neufeld, attorney
- David Paterson, 55th Governor of New York (2008–2010), former Lieutenant Governor of New York (2007–2008), former State Senator (1985–2006)
- Christine Quinn, former Speaker of the New York City Council
- Charles Rangel, former U.S. Representative for New York's 13th congressional district
- Rachael Rollins, District Attorney of Suffolk County, Massachusetts
- Kevin Richardson, member of the Central Park Five
- Yusef Salaam, member of the Central Park Five
- Raymond Santana, member of the Central Park Five
- Zephyr Teachout, attorney and law professor, candidate for governor of New York in 2014 and attorney general of New York in 2018

Organizations

- Citizens Union
- Color of Change PAC
- National Association of Social Workers NYC PAC (co-endorsement with Quart)
- Planned Parenthood of Greater New York Action Fund

Newspapers

- New York Amsterdam News
- The New York Times

Labor unions

- 1199 SEIU
- 32BJ SEIU
- Communications Workers of America Local 1180
- Retail, Wholesale and Department Store Union
- United Federation of Teachers
Liz Crotty

Individuals

- Raymond Kelly, former New York City Police Commissioner

Organizations

- Police Benevolent Association of the City of New York
Tali Farhadian Weinstein

Executive branch officials

- Hillary Clinton, former Secretary of State
- Eric Holder, former U.S. Attorney General

U.S. representatives

- Adriano Espaillat, U.S. Representative for New York's 13th congressional district since 2017
- Ritchie Torres, U.S. Representative for New York's 15th congressional district since 2021
- Nydia Velázquez, U.S. Representative for New York's 7th congressional district since 1993

Individuals

- Carol Bellamy, former President of the New York City Council
- Ben Jealous, former President of the NAACP
- Robbie Kaplan, lawyer, co-founder of Time's Up
- Ruth Messinger, former Manhattan Borough President
- Letty Cottin Pogrebin, author and activist
- Gloria Steinem, activist

Newspapers

- New York Daily News
- New York Post

Organizations

- Citizens Union
- National Organization for Women New York City
Diana Florence

Labor unions

- Amalgamated Transit Union Local 1181
- International Association of Bridge, Structural, Ornamental and Reinforcing Iron Workers New York State District Council & Local 361
- International Association of Heat and Frost Insulators and Allied Workers Local 12
- International Brotherhood of Electrical Workers Local 3
- International Brotherhood of Teamsters Joint Council 16 & Local 282
- International Union of Bricklayers and Allied Craftworkers Local 1 & Local 7
- International Union of Elevator Constructors Local 1
- International Union of Operating Engineers NYC Coalition
- International Union of Painters and Allied Trades District Council 9
- Operative Plasterers' and Cement Masons' International Association Local Union 262 & Local Union 780
- Sheet Metal Workers' International Association Local 28
Janos Marton

Individuals

- ~~Zephyr Teachout, attorney and law professor, candidate for governor of New York in 2014 and attorney general of New York in 2018~~ (switched endorsement to Bragg after Marton withdrew)
Lucy Lang

Individuals

- Rosanna Arquette, actor and director
- Valerie Bell, activist and mother of Sean Bell
- Valerie Castile, activist and mother of Philando Castile
- Caitlin Dulany, actress and activist
Eliza Orlins

Individuals

- Rabia Chaudry, attorney and author
- Charlotte Clymer, activist and author
- Simran Jeet Singh, activist and writer

Organizations

- Progressive Change Campaign Committee (first choice)

Labor unions

- United Auto Workers Region 9A
Dan Quart

U.S. representatives

- Carolyn Maloney, U.S. Representative for New York's 12th congressional district since 1993

Local officials

- Diana Ayala, member of the New York City Council from the 8th district since 2018

State senators

- John Liu, member of the New York State Senate from the 11th district since 2019
- José M. Serrano, member of the New York State Senate from the 29th district since 2019

State assemblymembers

- Harvey Epstein, member of the New York State Assembly from the 74th district since 2018
- Ron Kim, member of the New York State Assembly from the 40th district since 2013
- Robert J. Rodriguez, member of the New York State Assembly from the 68th district since 2011
- Carmen De La Rosa, member of the New York State Assembly from the 72nd district since 2017
- Rebecca Seawright, member of the New York State Assembly from the 76th district since 2015

Individuals

- Michael Blake, former member of the New York State Assembly from the 79th district
- Jeffrey Mark Deskovic, activist
- Mark Green, former New York City Public Advocate
- Aravella Simotas, former member of the New York State Assembly from the 36th district since 2013
- Thomas Sung, founder of Abacus Federal Savings Bank
- Michael K. Williams, actor

Organizations

- National Association of Social Workers NYC PAC (co-endorsement with Bragg)
- Stonewall Democratic Club of New York City

Labor unions

- Communications Workers of America Local 1101
- International Alliance of Theatrical Stage Employees Local 1
Declined to endorse

Organizations

- Democratic Socialists of America Manhattan branches

=== Polling ===
Poll source	Date(s) administered	Sample size	Margin of error	Tahanie Aboushi	Alvin Bragg	Liz Crotty	Tali Farhadian Weinstein	Diana Florence	Lucy Lang	Eliza Orlins	Dan Quart	Other	Undecided
Data For Progress (D)	June 18–20, 2021	451 (LV)	± 5.0%	10%	34%	2%	25%	1%	6%	3%	6%	14% (Note: "No One")	–
Data For Progress (D)	June 7–13, 2021	642 (LV)	± 4.0%	7%	26%	5%	26%	2%	8%	2%	5%	21%	–
Benenson Strategy Group (D) (Note: Poll sponsored by StudentsFirstNY, a pro-charter schools group)	April 16–21, 2021	390 (LV)	–	5%	6%	2%	16%	5%	12%	4%	3%	3%	44%
Tulchin Research (D) (Note: Poll sponsored by Aboushi's campaign)	April 6–11, 2021	500 (LV)	± 4.38%	11%	5%	2%	11%	2%	4%	2%	5%	–	57%

=== Debates and forum ===
2021 Manhattan district attorney Democratic primary debates and candidate forum
No.	Date	Host	Moderator	Link	Democratic	Democratic	Democratic	Democratic	Democratic	Democratic	Democratic	Democratic
Key: P Participant A Absent N Not invited I Invited W Withdrawn												
Key: P Participant A Absent N Not invited I Invited W Withdrawn					Tahanie Aboushi	Alvin Bragg	Liz Crotty	Tali Farhadian Weinstein	Diana Florence	Lucy Lang	Eliza Orlins	Dan Quart
1	May 13, 2021	Roosevelt House Public Policy Institute at Hunter College	Rachel Smith	YouTube	P	P	P	P	P	P	P	P
2	Apr. 15, 2021	NYU Wagner Students for Ending Mass Incarceration	Khalil Cumberbatch	YouTube	P	P	P	P	P	P	P	P
3	Jun. 15, 2021	Asian American Bar Association of New York Issues Committee		YouTube	P	P	N	P	N	P	N	N
3	Jun. 16, 2021 (Note: Republican candidate Thomas Kenniff also participated in the June 16 forum.)	Asian American Bar Association of New York Issues Committee		YouTube	N	N	P	N	P	N	P	N
4		New York City Bar Association	Nicholas Turner	YouTube	P	P	P	P	P	P	P	P
5		PoliticsNY	Skye Ostreicher; Steve Witt	YouTube	P	N	P	P	P	P	P	P

=== Results ===
==== By precinct ====

Bragg

20–30%
30–40%
40–50%
50–60%
60–70%
70–80%

Weinstein

20–30%
30–40%
40–50%
50–60%

Aboushi

20–30%
30–40%
50–60%

Lang

20–30%
30–40%
40–50%
90–100%

Florence

20–30%
30–40%

Quart

20–30%

Other

20-30% tie
30-40% tie
40-50% tie
No votes

Democratic primary
Party	Candidate	Votes	%
Democratic	Alvin Bragg	85,720	34.2%
Democratic	Tali Farhadian Weinstein	76,892	30.7%
Democratic	Tahanie Aboushi	27,458	11.0%
Democratic	Lucy Lang	18,910	7.5%
Democratic	Diana Florence	12,246	4.9%
Democratic	Liz Crotty	11,453	4.6%
Democratic	Eliza Orlins	10,610	4.2%
Democratic	Dan Quart	6,984	2.8%
Write-in		330	0.13%
Total valid votes		250,603	93.7%
Rejected ballots		16,908	6.3%
Total votes		267,511	100.0%

== Republican primary ==
=== Candidates ===
- Thomas Kenniff, former prosecutor

=== Results ===
Republican primary
Party	Candidate	Votes	%
Republican	Thomas Kenniff		
Total votes			100.00%

== General election ==
=== Debate ===
2021 Manhattan district attorney election debate
No.	Date	Host	Moderator	Link	Democratic	Republican
Key: P Participant A Absent N Not invited I Invited W Withdrawn						
Key: P Participant A Absent N Not invited I Invited W Withdrawn					Alvin Bragg	Thomas Kenniff
1		MNN NYC	Ben Max	YouTube	P	P

=== Results ===
2021 Manhattan district attorney election
Party	Candidate	Votes	%
Democratic	Alvin Bragg	211,686	83.6%
Republican	Thomas Kenniff	41,211	16.3%
Write-in		397	0.1%
Total votes		253,294	100.0%
Democratic hold			

== Notes ==
Partisan clients
