= Tali Farhadian Weinstein =

American attorney, professor, and politician

Personal details
- Born: Tali Farimah Farhadian; 1975 or 1976 (age 49–50) Tehran, Iran
- Party: Democratic
- Spouse: Boaz Weinstein (m. 2010; div. 2024)
- Children: 3
- Education: Yale University (BA, JD); Magdalen College, Oxford (MPhil)
- Website: Campaign website

Tali Farimah Farhadian Weinstein (born in 1975 or 1976) is an Iranian-born American attorney, professor, and politician. She is a former federal and state prosecutor and was a candidate in the 2021 Manhattan District Attorney race. In November 2024, President Joe Biden announced his intention to nominate her as a United States district judge of the United States District Court for the Southern District of New York, but did not send her nomination to the United States Senate before he left office.

Born in Iran to a Jewish family, Farhadian Weinstein came to the United States as a refugee in 1979. Her family became eligible for U.S. citizenship through President Ronald Reagan's 1986 amnesty program. After graduating from Yale University and Magdalen College, Oxford, she earned her Juris Doctor degree from Yale Law School. She then became a law clerk for Judge Merrick Garland at the U.S. Court of Appeals for the D.C. Circuit, and subsequently for Justice Sandra Day O'Connor during O'Connor's last two years on the Supreme Court of the United States.

Farhadian Weinstein worked at the U.S. Department of Justice from 2009 to 2017, first as counsel to Eric Holder, the U.S. Attorney General during the Barack Obama administration, and then as an Assistant U.S. Attorney in the United States District Court for the Eastern District of New York. She later served as general counsel to Brooklyn District Attorney Eric Gonzalez from 2018 to 2020. In 2021, Farhadian Weinstein was a candidate in the Democratic primary for New York County District Attorney.

Since 2017, she has also taught at the New York University School of Law where she continues to serve as an adjunct professor. In late 2021, she became a legal analyst for NBC News.

In September 2026, Farhadian Weinstein became CEO of the Museum of Jewish Heritage in New York City.

== Early life and education ==
A Persian Jew, Farhadian was born in Tehran, Iran, to Farah Farhadian, then a biostatistician and now a math teacher, and Nasser Dan Farhadian, a hydraulic engineer. Her paternal grandfather was a cloth peddler. She has a younger brother, Leeor.

After fleeing antisemitism and the Islamic Revolution in Iran, and spending 10 months in Israel (where her parents attended university), Farhadian arrived in the United States with her family at four years old on Christmas Eve in 1979. The Hebrew Immigrant Aid Society helped the family apply for asylum, and they became eligible for US citizenship through President Ronald Reagan's 1986 amnesty policies.

The family lived first in Queens, New York, and then in North Jersey. She attended day school at the Moriah School and the Frisch School. She studied in Israel in 1992 pursuant to a Bronfman Youth Fellowship.

In 1997, Farhadian graduated from Yale University where she majored in humanities. She edited the Yale Women's Haggadah, a feminist interpretation of the Jewish Passover text. She wrote her senior essay on the Spanish Jewish poet and philosopher Yehuda Halevi. She received Yale's Alpheus Henry Snow Prize.

As a Rhodes Scholar, she attended Magdalen College, Oxford in England where she earned a MPhil in Oriental Studies (Modern Middle East Studies) in 1999, writing her thesis on the literature of Jews from the Arab world in Israel.

She then earned a Juris Doctor from Yale Law School in 2003, where Farhadian received the Paul & Daisy Soros Fellowship for New Americans. She passed the New York State Bar Exam in July 2003.

== Career ==
From 2003 to 2004, Farhadian Weinstein was a law clerk for Judge Merrick Garland of the United States Court of Appeals for the D.C. Circuit. From 2004 to 2006, she clerked for US Supreme Court Justice Sandra Day O'Connor. From 2006 to 2007, she was a litigation associate at Debevoise & Plimpton in New York City. From 2007 to 2008, she was an adjunct professor of law at Columbia Law School.

In 2009, Farhadian Weinstein joined the U.S. Department of Justice. Through June 2010, she served with the Department as Counsel to the Attorney General of the United States Eric Holder, helping create guidelines on prosecutorial discretion on indictments and sentencing recommendations. Farhadian Weinstein joined the U.S. Attorney's Office in 2011 as an Assistant U.S. Attorney in the Eastern District of New York, where she investigated and prosecuted federal crimes including violent crimes, public corruption, narcotics trafficking, and national security matters, serving through 2017.

From 2018 to 2020, she was the general counsel for Brooklyn District Attorney Eric Gonzalez. During this period, she created a post-conviction justice bureau to reevaluate possible wrongful convictions in collaboration with the Innocence Project. Besides the post-conviction justice bureau, she oversaw the Brooklyn District Attorney office's appeals bureau, civil litigation bureau, and law enforcement accountability bureau. She has also been an adjunct professor at NYU Law School since 2017.

Farhadian Weinstein stepped down from her position at the Brooklyn District Attorney's office in July 2020, to become a candidate in the Democratic primary for the 2021 New York County District Attorney race to replace Cyrus Vance Jr. and oversee more than 500 lawyers in Manhattan. She and fellow candidate Alvin Bragg were the top fundraisers in the race, which included $8.2 million of her own money. Farhadian Weinstein was the only candidate who had worked in a New York City district attorney's office and been a federal prosecutor. An April 21, 2021, poll by Benenson Strategy Group found her leading with 16% of those polled. She was endorsed by the New York Post and the New York Daily News. She was also endorsed by former attorney general Eric Holder, Hillary Clinton, and Gloria Steinem, as well as Representatives Adriano Espaillat, Nydia Velázquez, and Ritchie Torres. She was also endorsed by New York City branch of the National Organization for Women and Robbie Kaplan, who co-founded the Time's Up Legal Defense Fund.

Farhadian Weinstein had the most votes in several neighborhoods including the Upper East Side, Inwood and Washington Heights. She earned 30.7% of the total vote, second to Bragg's 34.3%, in a primary with eight candidates. On July 2, 2021, Farhadian Weinstein conceded the primary to Bragg. In late 2021, she became a legal analyst for NBC News.

Farhadian Weinstein was appointed to the board of trustees of the New York Public Library in May 2018, and serves on the board of directors of the International Refugee Assistance Project. She previously served on the Reform Leadership Council of the Vera Institute of Justice.

On November 8, 2024, President Joe Biden announced his intention to nominate Farhadian Weinstein to serve as a United States district judge of the United States District Court for the Southern District of New York. Her nomination was not sent to the United States Senate before Biden left office.

On May 27, 2026, Farhadian Weinstein was announced as the incoming CEO of the Museum of Jewish Heritage effective September 8, 2026.

== Political positions ==
During her 2021 campaign for the Democratic primary nomination for the New York County District Attorney race, she proposed creating a new Bureau of Gender-Based Violence, composed of a Sex Crimes Unit and a Domestic Violence Unit, in the district attorney's office. She supports abolishing cash bail entirely, and giving judges discretion to jail defendants who they believe pose a danger.

Farhadian Weinstein does not support defunding the police, calling the phrase "inflammatory". At a forum with the eight candidates for the Manhattan DA's office, she was one of only two who said they would not "defund the police," something that the DA's office has no authority over. She has indicated support for police reform. She was in favor of the repeal of a rule that kept personnel files for police officers confidential. This rule was repealed in 2020 by the New York State Legislature.

Farhadian Weinstein supports letting citizens of foreign countries living in the United States vote in local city elections.

== Personal life ==
In November 2010, Farhadian married hedge fund manager Boaz Weinstein, whom she had met while attending a book party of the UJA-Federation of New York, at the Central Synagogue in Manhattan. In 2012, they purchased a $25.5 million property at 907 Fifth Avenue, from the estate of Huguette Clark. In May 2020, they gave $2 million to non-profits helping domestic violence victims. They divorced in 2024. The former couple share three daughters.

In 2021, ProPublica reported that Farhadian Weinstein and her husband had paid virtually no federal income taxes in four of six recent years. This was despite reported annual income as high as $107 million.

== Electoral history ==
Democratic primary for the 2021 New York County district attorney election
Party	Candidate	Votes	%
Democratic	Alvin Bragg	85,720	34.2%
Democratic	Tali Farhadian Weinstein	76,892	30.7%
Democratic	Tahanie Aboushi	27,458	11.0%
Democratic	Lucy Lang	18,910	7.5%
Democratic	Diana Florence	12,246	4.9%
Democratic	Liz Crotty	11,453	4.6%
Democratic	Eliza Orlins	10,610	4.2%
Democratic	Dan Quart	6,984	2.8%
Write-in		330	0.13%
Total valid votes		250,603	93.7%
Rejected ballots		16,908	6.3%
Total votes		267,511	100.0%

== See also ==
- List of law clerks for the eighth seat of the Supreme Court of the United States
- List of Iranian women in academia
