= Cyrus Vance Jr. =

American attorney and politician (born 1954)

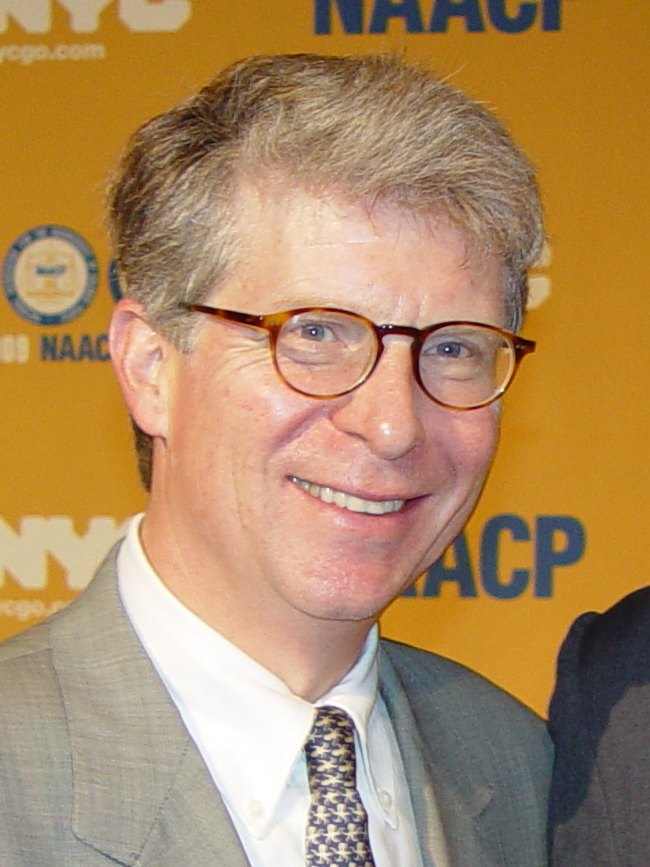
- Vance in 2009

36th District Attorney of New York County
- In office January 1, 2010 – December 31, 2021
- Preceded by: Robert Morgenthau
- Succeeded by: Alvin Bragg Jr.

Personal details
- Born: Cyrus Roberts Vance Jr. June 14, 1954 (age 72) New York City, New York, U.S.
- Party: Democratic
- Spouse: Peggy McDonnell (m. 1984)
- Children: 2
- Parent: Cyrus Vance (father)
- Education: Yale University (BA); Georgetown University (JD)

Cyrus Roberts Vance Jr. (born June 14, 1954) is an American attorney and retired politician who served as the District Attorney of New York County, New York. He was previously a principal partner at the law firm of Morvillo, Abramowitz, Grand, Iason, Anello, & Bohrer, P.C. He is the son of Cyrus Vance, former Secretary of State under President Jimmy Carter. Vance did not seek reelection as District Attorney in the 2021 election, and was succeeded by Alvin Bragg. He is currently a partner at Baker McKenzie.

== Early life and education ==
Vance was born and raised in New York City. He is the son of Grace Elsie (Sloane) and Cyrus R. Vance, who served as Secretary of the Army under presidents John F. Kennedy and Lyndon B. Johnson, Deputy Secretary of Defense under President Johnson, and Secretary of State to President Jimmy Carter.

Vance attended the Buckley and Groton Schools, and then went on to graduate from Yale University. He then earned a Juris Doctor from Georgetown University Law Center in 1982. While in law school, he planned campaign trips for Colorado Senator Gary Hart.

== Career ==
=== Legal work ===
Upon graduating from Georgetown, Vance joined the Manhattan District Attorney's office as an Assistant District Attorney, where he supervised grand jury investigations and prosecuted cases involving murder, organized crime, career criminals, political corruption, international art fraud, and white-collar crime.

In 1988, Vance moved to Seattle because, according to Vance, he wanted to build a name for himself independent of his father's influence. In 1995, Vance co-founded McNaul Ebel Nawrot Helgren & Vance. During this time, Vance taught trial advocacy as an adjunct professor at Seattle University School of Law.

In 2004, Vance returned to New York, where he joined Morvillo, Abramowitz, Grand, Iason, Anello & Bohrer, P.C. as a principal.

Vance is admitted to the bar in New York State, Washington state, and Washington, D.C., and to practice before the United States Supreme Court, the U.S. District Courts for the Southern District of New York and Western and Eastern Districts of Washington, and the U.S. Second and Ninth Circuit Courts of Appeals.

Vance is a Fellow in the American College of Trial Lawyers, and is listed in The Best Lawyers in America – The New York Area’s Best Lawyers and New York’s Superlawyers – Manhattan Edition.

=== Public service ===
Vance was a consulting expert to the Office of Family and Children Ombudsman in its investigation of the Wenatchee child abuse prosecutions, and served as Special Assistant New York State Attorney General representing the state in investigations and litigation. He has served on sentencing commissions in two states, including New York, where he served on the Governor's Sentencing Commission, which helped overhaul New York's Rockefeller drug laws.

Vance also served, by appointment of the Governor of New York, as a member of the New York State Appellate Division, First Department, Judicial Screening Panel which makes recommendations on judicial appointments. Vance is a member of the Criminal Justice Council of the New York City Bar Association, the Federal Bar Council, and the New York Council of Defense Lawyers.

He is a member of the Board of Directors of the Fund for Modern Courts, the Sargent Shriver National Center on Poverty Law, and the Alzheimer's Drug Discovery Foundation.

=== 2009 New York County District Attorney election ===
In 2008, Vance announced his intention to seek the District Attorney's office only if current District Attorney Robert Morgenthau decided to retire. On March 9, 2009, 10 days after Morgenthau made his decision to retire public, Vance officially announced his candidacy for the office. In an April 8, 2009, appearance on Charlie Rose, Morgenthau said of Vance, "I think Vance is by far the best qualified. Good lawyer, fair." Morgenthau officially endorsed Vance on June 25.

Other Democrats who endorsed Vance included former Mayor David Dinkins, Public Advocate Betsy Gotbaum, Gloria Steinem, Caroline Kennedy, Robert F. Kennedy Jr., Congresswoman Nydia Velázquez, Manhattan Borough President Scott Stringer, and Innocence Project co-founders Barry Scheck and Peter Neufeld. The New York Times, New York Daily News, New York Post, and New York Amsterdam News also endorsed Vance.

Vance stated that as Manhattan District Attorney, he would develop a program of "Community Based Justice", in which teams of prosecutors would be aligned to specific precincts and communities so as to develop a working relationship with community members, police officers, and local organizations. According to Vance, the Community Based Justice Program would make crime reduction a central measure of performance. Vance has also proposed a plan designed to reduce the year-long case backlog in the New York Criminal Court where the overwhelming majority of criminal cases are brought. In addition to processing cases, Vance has expressed his commitment to establishing a conviction integrity panel to carefully review allegations of wrongful conviction and promoting alternatives to incarceration that do not compromise public safety.

Vance states that he has always been opposed to the death penalty.

Vance emerged victorious after facing former judge and 2005 D.A. candidate Leslie Crocker Snyder, and Richard Aborn, another former Assistant District Attorney and gun control advocate, in the September 15, 2009, Democratic primary. The victory ensured that Vance would become only the fourth person to run the office since 1941, given the traditional absence during Morgenthau's tenure of a Republican backed opponent.

On November 3, 2009, Vance won the general election with a 91 percent share of the votes cast.

== New York County District Attorney ==
Vance was sworn into office as the New York County District Attorney on January 1, 2010. Within a few months, he established or consolidated numerous new bureaus and units in an effort to modernize the District Attorney's Office. Vance's administration established a Conviction Integrity Program, Crime Strategies Unit, Cybercrime and Identity Theft Bureau, Forensic Sciences/ Cold Case Unit, Hate Crimes Unit, Public Integrity Unit, Special Victims Bureau, and Vehicular Crimes Unit.

=== Notable cases ===
In 2011, a New York prosecutor from Vance's office argued on behalf of billionaire and sex offender Jeffrey Epstein, to New York Supreme Court Judge Ruth Pickholtz, asking for Epstein's sex offender status to be reduced. The reasoning was that Epstein had not been indicted and his underage victims had failed to cooperate in the case. Pickholtz, however, denied the petition, and expressed bewilderment that a New York prosecutor would make such a request on behalf of a serial sex offender accused of molesting multiple girls: "I have to tell you, I’m a little overwhelmed because I have never seen a prosecutor’s office do anything like this. I have done so many [sex offender registration hearings] much less troubling than this one where the [prosecutor] would never make a downward argument like this." Jennifer Gaffney, then deputy chief of Vance's sex crimes unit, stated at the hearing that, “There is only an indictment for one victim. If an offender is not indicted for an offense, it is strong evidence that the offense did not occur.” Pickholz rejected Gaffney's arguments and gave Epstein the highest sex-offender status – Level 3. In 2019, Epstein was arrested and charged with sex trafficking. The New York Times reported in 2019 that Vance "said the request was a mistake and had been made by Ms. Gaffney without his knowledge."

Vance's recent successes include the sentencing of a serial rapist to 428 years to life in prison; sentencing of a man to 23 years to life in prison for a domestic violence murder; indictments against 26 individuals living in Manhattan who possessed violent child pornography; the sentencing of a man to at least 15 years in prison for a 2000 rape; a sentencing of a man to 25 to life in prison for a 1997 home invasion and murder; an indictment against another man for a 1986 rape and murder; and the guilty plea of a man for attacking a woman in the restroom of a bar in Hell's Kitchen.

Vance has also won convictions in an October 2009 drunk driving incident that killed 11-year-old Leandra Rosado, resulting in the creation of Leandra's Law; and a case of two men in a 2005 murder-for-hire plot. In January 2011, the District Attorney's Forensic Sciences/ Cold Case Unit announced an indictment against serial killer Rodney Alcala for two Manhattan homicides in the 1970s. Vance's newly created Major Economic Crimes Bureau has won convictions in the $120 million art fraud prosecution of the Salander-O'Reilly Gallery, the gallery's president Lawrence Salander and director Leigh Morse, in which Robert De Niro was one of the principal witnesses for the prosecution; a $100 million-dollar securities fraud scheme in which Yale University was one of the victims; a $100 million-dollar mortgage fraud case; and a $7 million-dollar Ponzi scheme. The District Attorney's Office in June 2011 announced indictments in a conspiracy involving 11 corporations who evaded U.S. economic sanctions on Iran by funneling tens of millions of dollars through Manhattan banks. To date, Vance's administration has brought hundreds of millions of dollars in settlements to New York City.

Cyrus Vance prosecuted programmer Sergey Aleynikov for duplicating computer code from Goldman Sachs, following the reversal of his federal conviction by the United States Court of Appeals for the Second Circuit. The state case found Aleynikov guilty. However, on July 6, 2015, a New York State Supreme Court justice overturned that decision, but an appellate court reinstated the jury's guilty verdict on January 24, 2017. 148 AD3d 77 [1st Dept 2017], affirmed, 31 NY3d 383 [2018].

In 2020, a New York City police officer was filmed punching and pepper-spraying a homeless man in the face. According to the police officer, he sustained swelling to his hand after the man allegedly kicked him while handcuffed to the platform. Vance's office has charged the homeless man with felony assault, punishable by up to seven years in prison. The Legal Aid society notes that the police originally charged the man with lesser crimes, but Vance's office chose to upgrade the charges: "It's shocking that the Manhattan District Attorney's Office, despite seeing this video, chose to bump up the charges against our client. We are calling on them to dismiss these charges immediately in the interest of justice." Following scrutiny and criticism after footage was released to the public, Vance's office dropped some of the charges, but Legal Aid calls for the other charges to also be dropped (resisting arrest, obstruction, taking up an extra seat on the train), as well as for the officers to be sanctioned.

=== Abacus Federal Savings Bank case ===
In 2009, Abacus Federal Savings Bank, a small Chinese-American family-run bank in New York City's Chinatown, self-reported a mortgage fraud committed by an ex-employee to its regulators. It led Cyrus Vance's office to later accuse the bank itself of mortgage fraud. In an unusual move characterized by critics as an effort at grandstanding, Vance's office orchestrated a parade of ex-employees of the bank in a chain, handcuffed to each other, in front of reporters. After Vance spent five years and $10 million prosecuting the bank for larceny, the bank and its employees were found not guilty on all 80 charges.

The bank was the only New York bank so charged during the Great Recession, although Vance said that Citibank, among others, had behaved badly. The episode was covered in a feature-length documentary by Steve James, Abacus: Small Enough to Jail, which characterized Vance as using the bank's owners as scapegoats for a broader national pattern of financial misconduct in an effort to appear tough on white-collar crime. The film premiered at the Toronto International Film Festival in 2016, was broadcast on PBS Frontline in 2017, and was nominated for an Oscar.

=== Motor vehicle driver prosecution ===
In spite of vulnerable user laws passed during Vance's tenure, and his administration's own initiatives, contemporary media commentary repeatedly questioned Vance's commitment to meaningfully punishing motor vehicle offenses.

In July 2010, no charges were filed when an MTA tow truck struck and killed a seven-year-old boy standing on the sidewalk. In October 2010, Vance declined to press charges in the dooring death of Marcus Ewing, on the rationale that, because the engine was not running and because the person who opened the door into Ewing's path did not have the keys in his possession, that person could not be prosecuted as a driver.

In August 2013, a cab driver hopped a curb, injuring several pedestrians and severing the leg of a British tourist. Despite a history of driving offenses, and admitting that he intentionally hit the gas before entering the sidewalk, the driver was able to regain his cab license, and after a two-month investigation, no charges were filed.

In October 2014, Vance's office offered a plea to a driver accused of intentionally striking a cyclist with his car. The deal reduced charges of third-degree assault, punishable by up to a year in jail, to leaving the scene of an accident with property damage. The motorist paid a $250 fine.

=== Dominique Strauss-Kahn case ===
Vance initially came under criticism by the media for ultimately dismissing charges in the Dominique Strauss-Kahn sexual assault case, after the French head of the International Monetary Fund was arrested, based on accusations by a hotel maid at the Sofitel hotel who said he had forced her to perform oral sex when she came to clean his room. Kahn admitted the encounter had taken place, but maintained the sex was consensual. However, Vance was praised by New York City Mayor Michael Bloomberg, former Mayor Ed Koch, former Manhattan District Attorney Robert Morgenthau, and other prominent litigators and government officials for adhering to prosecutorial protocol and acting "with integrity". Vance has also been applauded in editorials by the New York Times, Wall Street Journal, and the New York Daily News for making a "tough but fair and just call" in "an exceptional case" in which a woman made a "credible" accusation against a very powerful man. The Wall Street Journal wrote: "DSK got neither more nor less than he deserved – something for which he can blame, and thank, Cy Vance and America's justice system." He dropped all charges against the defendant on August 11, stating that he could not prove Kahn's guilt beyond reasonable doubt due to questions about the credibility of the accuser Nafissatou Diallo.

=== Paul Manafort ===
On March 13, 2019, Vance filed 16 indictments charging mortgage fraud against Paul Manafort, former chairman of Donald Trump's 2016 presidential campaign. Vance said the charges stemmed from an investigation launched in March 2017. These charges were subsequently dismissed by a judge, ruling that they constituted double jeopardy.

=== Political contributions and non-prosecutions ===
From August 2017, allegations appeared across various news media outlets concerning Vance's associations, and certain contributions made to his office in relation to past cases. Under scrutiny are the Manhattan DA's handling of allegations of sexual assault against film producer Harvey Weinstein, and allegations of his handling of improper conduct by members of the Trump family around the Trump SoHo development. Critics have suggested that contributions to the DA around these times were directly linked to Vance not prosecuting these cases. Vance has defended the actions of his office, citing insufficient evidence to prosecute in each case.

In March 2018, New York Gov. Andrew Cuomo announced that the New York State attorney general will investigate the Manhattan district attorney's handling of a 2015 sexual abuse case involving Weinstein. NYPD investigators who investigated the 2015 case believed that the sexual abuse case was strong enough to be prosecuted, but Vance opted not to prosecute the case.

The case concerned a 22-year old Filipina-Italian model, Ambra Battilana Gutierrez, who went straight to the police after Weinstein lunged at her, groping her breasts and attempting to put a hand up her skirt while she protested. The next day she met with Weinstein, equipped with a NYPD wire tap. In the recording, published by The New Yorker and ABC News, Weinstein insists – "I'm telling you right now, get in here." Gutierrez explicitly refuses, adding "yesterday was kind of aggressive for me" and asks why he had groped her breast the day before. "Oh, please, I’m sorry, just come on in. I’m used to that. Come on. Please," he says. "You are used to that?” Gutierrez asks. “Yes,” Weinstein replies, later adding: “Don’t ruin your friendship with me for five minutes."

Special Victims Division Chief Michael Osgood told New York Magazine that he decided to hide Battilana from Vance and his investigators, who he believed were working to discredit Battilana. Osgood believed Vance would undermine the case, given that he had previously dropped a similar case against Dominique Strauss-Kahn. David Boies, an attorney who has represented Weinstein, had donated $10,000 after Vance's office refused to prosecute on the Gutierrez case. Ultimately, Vance dropped the case after his investigators questioned Battilana. One sergeant claims the questioning was "aggressive and accusatory" and the victim "felt like she was under attack". Despite the existence of the tape of the sexual assault, Vance claimed the case would not have been provable.

Vance prosecuted possession of gravity knives with a broad interpretation. The law banning them was enforced mainly in Manhattan, and was the subject of several repeal efforts in the New York state legislature. Cuomo vetoed two such repeal bills passed in two years. On March 27, 2019, in Cracco v. Vance, No. 14 Civ. 8235 (SDNY), a federal judge ruled that Vance's office had applied the law unconstitutionally, resulting in a lack of notice of prohibited behavior as well as allowing for arbitrary and discriminatory enforcement. Soon after, state lawmakers Dan Quart and Diane Savino introduced a third iteration of the bill repealing the gravity knife ban. On May 31, 2019, Cuomo signed the bill into law, making gravity knives legal to possess in the state of New York.

=== Investigation into Donald Trump ===
As part of his office's ongoing criminal investigation arising from the Stormy Daniels–Donald Trump scandal, Vance subpoenaed Trump's accounting firm Mazars for eight years' worth of Trump's personal and business tax returns and related documents in August 2019. Trump filed suit against Vance and Mazars in the United States District Court for the Southern District of New York to block the subpoena, claiming that as president he was immune from criminal investigation of any kind. The case was appealed through district and appeals courts and ultimately the U.S. Supreme Court. In July 2020 the U.S. Supreme Court held that the president is not immune from state criminal subpoenas which are directed at his private papers, and remanded the case to lower courts for further review. District and appeals courts again found the subpoena to be valid, and Trump appealed those findings to the Supreme Court on October 13, 2020, asking for a stay of the lower court rulings. In an unsigned opinion issued on February 22, 2021, the Supreme Court denied the stay, and Vance's office received the documents by February 25.

Earlier in February, Vance's office had hired a consulting company to analyze and manage the documents, and engaged prominent New York attorney Mark F. Pomerantz to assist in the investigation. Among other issues, the investigation is reportedly looking into whether different values for the same properties were reported to lenders, insurance companies, and government taxing authorities.

Vance, and separately New York State Attorney General Letitia James, also investigated the Trump Organization's Chief Financial Officer Allen Weisselberg and his family. Vance's inquiry into whether the Weisselbergs had received untaxed benefits from the Trump Organization was widely perceived as part of a strategy to gain more information about Trump. Financial records were obtained from Jennifer Weisselberg in April 2021. The investigation of the Trump Organization turned to criminal matters, as announced on May 18, 2021, by the New York State Attorney General's office which was jointly pursuing the criminal investigation with Vance.

Vance passed the ongoing investigation to the next New York County District Attorney, Alvin Bragg, who took office on January 1, 2022.

== Personal life ==
Vance and his wife, printer and photographer Peggy McDonnell, were married in 1984 and have two children.

== See also ==
- Tax returns of Donald Trump

Legal offices
Preceded by Robert Morgenthau	District Attorney of New York County; 2010–2022	Succeeded by Alvin Bragg Jr.
