= George Whipple III =

American lawyer

- Born: December 7, 1954 (age 71)
- Education: Columbia University (BA, JD)
- Alma mater: The Choate School
- Occupations: Lawyer, reporter, photographer
- Employer: NY1 News
- Relatives: Allison Whipple Rockefeller (sister)

George Carroll Whipple, III (born December 7, 1954) is an American lawyer, reporter, and photographer. He is on the board of directors of the law firm Epstein Becker Green and an entertainment and lifestyle commentator for “Whipple’s World” on NY1 News.

== Biography ==
Whipple was born to George Carroll Whipple Jr., an advertising and publishing executive and Joe Ann Feeley. Through his father, he is a descendant of John Whipple, an early settler of the Colony of Rhode Island and Providence Plantations, Senator Daniel Webster, Massachusetts founding father William Whipple, and fellow signers of the United States Declaration of Independence Charles Carroll of Carrollton and Stephen Hopkins. His sister is conservationist Allison Whipple Rockefeller, daughter-in-law of Rodman Rockefeller, a son of former Vice President Nelson Rockefeller.

Whipple ran campaign for town supervisor of his hometown, Kent, New York, as a 14-year old. He graduated from The Choate School and received his B.A. from Columbia College and J.D. from Columbia Law School. He was president of the secret society St. Anthony Hall at Columbia. He also studied at St Peter's College, Oxford and New York University.

Whipple started his career as Cravath, Swaine & Moore. He left the law firm in 1987 and became a freelance photographer. He shot for The New York Times Magazine and Town and Country, and Playboy. He then joined Donaldson, Lufkin & Jenrette in 1994 and rose to the head of the employment law group before joining Credit Suisse and became the managing director and chairman of Credit Suisse's global human resources, executive compensation and employment law group. He joined Epstein Becker Green in 2015.

In 1994, Whipple also became a correspondent for NY1 and began making twice-weekly celebrity reports.

== Personal life ==
Whipple is known for his eyebrows and was called the "eyebrow man" by The New York Times. He is a New York society fixture and helped organize the "New Four Hundred Ball" on February 19, 1986, at Park Avenue Armory.

In 1987, Whipple married Kit Tobin, daughter of San Francisco Chronicle director Michael de Young Tobin and great-granddaughter of San Francisco newspaperman M. H. de Young, benefactor of De Young Museum. He later became engaged to Lisa Woodward, widow of banking heir William Woodward III, grandson of William Woodward Sr. and son of William Woodward Jr. He married Victoria Meltzer in 2016.

He was impersonated by Darrell Hammond on Saturday Night Live in 1996.
