= Chaminade High School =

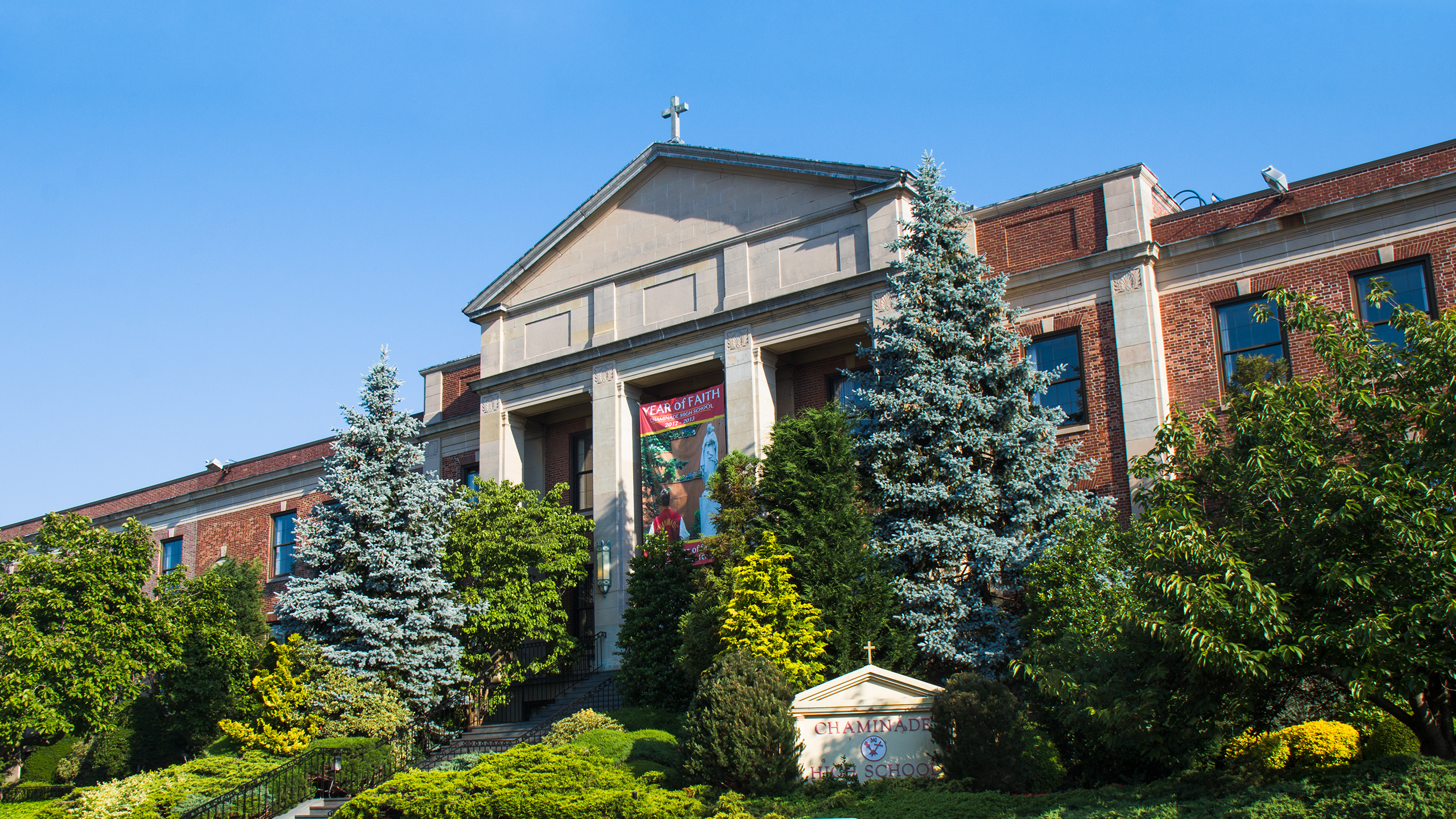
- Chaminade High School building facade

Location
- 340 Jackson Avenue; Mineola, New York 11501-2441; United States; 40°44′39″N 73°38′58″W

Information
- Type: Private
- Motto: Fortes in Unitate (Strength in Unity)
- Religious affiliation: Marianist
- Established: 1930
- Status: Open
- CEEB code: 333150
- President: Bro. Thomas Cleary S.M. ‘81
- Dean: Thomas Dillon ‘92
- Principal: Robert (Bob) Paul ‘92
- Chaplain: Rev. Peter Heiskell S.M. ‘86
- Faculty: 92 total; 58 Chaminade Alumni
- Grades: 9-12
- Gender: Boys
- Enrollment: 1,703 (2022-2023)
- Student to teacher ratio: 18:1
- Hours in school day: 8:05 - 2:47
- Colors: Crimson and Gold
- Athletics: 17 sports
- Athletics conference: CHSAA
- Team name: Flyers
- Rivals: St. Anthony's High School; Kellenberg Memorial High School
- Accreditation: MSA
- Publication: Skylight (literary magazine)
- Newspaper: Tarmac
- Yearbook: Crimson and Gold
- Endowment: $92,553,445
- Tuition: $16,340 Total Tuition Paid $2,340 Paid for by Torch Fund $18,680 Total Tuition Without Torch Fund
- Website: chaminade-hs.org

Chaminade High School is a Catholic college preparatory high school for boys. The school is located in the village of Mineola, on Long Island, New York. The Marianist Province of Meribah operates two high schools, Chaminade (all-boys) and Kellenberg Memorial High School (coeducational). The school is named for Blessed William Joseph Chaminade, SM, the founder of the Society of Mary.

The main campus of Chaminade in Mineola is comprised five buildings: the Chaminade High School building itself; the Dolan Family Science, Technology, and Research Center (STRC); the Chaminade Activity-Athletic Center (AAC); the Physical Fitness Center (PFC), and Saragossa Day Retreat Center. The STRC was built through a donation from the Dolan Family Foundation, created by Helen and Charles Dolan. The AAC hosts basketball, wrestling, religious services, and other events.

Saragossa is one of two retreat centers Chaminade students have access to, alongside Meribah Retreat House in Muttontown, New York. In addition to Saragossa and Meribah, Chaminade students also share Founders Hollow, a retreat property of over 100 acres in Accord, New York, with Kellenberg Memorial students.

== Academics ==
The academic selection at Chaminade is based entirely on honors-level courses, with Advanced Placement courses offered as well. All students, including seniors, are required to have completely filled schedules.

Chaminade's average SAT score is 1245 and the average ACT score is 27.2.

== Athletics ==
The lacrosse team has frequently been ranked within the top 10 schools in the United States, occasionally taking the top national spot, according to lists from organizations such as Inside Lacrosse and USA Lacrosse.

The school participates in 17 sports: crew, cross country, football, soccer, swimming and diving, basketball, bowling, ice hockey, riflery, track and field, wrestling, baseball, golf, lacrosse, rugby, tennis, and volleyball.

== Notable alumni ==
- Tim Berbenich '98, game management and quarterbacks coach for the Pittsburgh Steelers of the National Football League (2026–present)
- Brendan B. Brown '91, Wheatus frontman
- Christopher Cardone '76, Archbishop of Honiara (2016–present)
- Angelo Carusone '00, president of Media Matters for America (2016–present)
- Sean Coffey '74, General Counsel of the U.S. Navy (2022–2025) and U.S. Navy Captain (1978–2004)
- Luke Cummo '98, former mixed martial artist and The Ultimate Fighter 2 competitor
- Al D'Amato '55, former member of the United States Senate from New York (1981–1999)
- Brian Dennehy '56, Tony Award-winning actor
- Anthony D'Esposito '00, Inspector General of the United States Department of Labor (2026–present) and former member of the United States House of Representatives from New York's 4th congressional district (2023–2025)
- Lou Gerstner '59, former chairman and CEO of RJR Nabisco (1989–1993) and IBM (1993–2002) and chairman of The Carlyle Group (2003–2008)
- Al Groh '62, former head coach for the New York Jets of the National Football League (2000)
- Kemp Hannon '63, former member of the New York State Senate from the 6th district (1989–2018)
- Richard Henning '82, Archbishop of Boston (2024–present)
- Glenn Hughes '68, Village People singer
- Stephen Karopczyc '61, Medal of Honor recipient
- George Kennedy '43, Academy Award-winning actor
- Jim Kissane '64, former American Basketball Association player for the Minnesota Pipers
- John Lannan '02, mental performance coach for the Toronto Blue Jays of Major League Baseball (2024–present) and former player for the Washington Nationals, Philadelphia Phillies, and New York Mets
- Gene Larkin '80, former Major League Baseball player for Minnesota Twins
- Jack Martins '85, member of the New York State Senate from the 7th district (2011–2016, 2023–present)
- George P. McCabe '62, statistician and Purdue University professor
- Bob McKillop '67, former head coach for Davidson Wildcats men's basketball (1989–2022)
- Joe Mullaney '43, former National Basketball Association and collegiate player and coach
- Joseph Nocella '82, United States Attorney for the Eastern District of New York (2025–present)
- Bill O'Reilly '67, political commentator, author, and television host for Inside Edition (1989–1995), Fox News(1996–2017), and The First TV (2020–present)
- Bill Owens '67, former member of the United States House of Representatives from New York's 23rd congressional district (2009–2013) and 21st congressional district (2013–2015)
- Phil Quartararo '74, former CEO of Virgin Records (1992–1997) and president of Warner Records (1997–2002)
- Ed Ra '00, Minority Leader of the New York State Assembly (2026–present) and member from the 21st district (2010–2012) and 19th district (2013–present)
- Keith Raad '11, radio play-by-play voice for the New York Mets of Major League Baseball
- Kevin Reilly '80, former media executive at FX (2000–2003), NBC (2003–2007), Fox (2007–2014), Turner Entertainment (2014–2020), and HBO Max (2018–2020)
- Ted Robinson '74, play-by-play voice for NBC (1986–1989, 2000–present) and former voice for the North Stars (1980–1982), Twins (1981–1982), Athletics (1983–1985), Warriors (1983–1985), MLB Game of the Week (1986–1989), Hornets (1989–1990), Baseball Network (1994–1995), Mets (1996–1999), TBS (2007), and 49ers (2009–2018)
- Christopher Ruddy '83, founder and CEO of Newsmax (1998–present)
- Tom Slattery '14, distance runner specializing in marathons and Lieutenant Junior Grade in the U.S. Coast Guard
- Thomas Spota '59, former Suffolk County District Attorney (2002–2017)
- Richard J. Sullivan '82, circuit judge of the U.S. Court of Appeals for the Second Circuit (2018–present) and former district judge of the U.S. District Court for the Southern District of New York (2007–2018)
- Tom Suozzi '80, member of the United States House of Representatives from New York's 3rd congressional district (2017–2023, 2024–present) and former Nassau County Executive (2002–2009) and mayor of Glen Cove (1994–2001)
- Mike Vaccaro '85, lead sports columnist for The New York Post (2002–present)
- Greg Van Roten '08, National Football League player for the Green Bay Packers, Carolina Panthers, New York Jets, Buffalo Bills, Las Vegas Raiders, and New York Giants and All-Ivy player for the Penn Quakers
- Vinoo Varghese '90, criminal defense attorney and television legal analyst
- Bill White '85, U.S. Ambassador to Belgium (2025–present) and former president of the Intrepid Museum and Intrepid Fallen Heroes Fund
- Bob Wright '61, former president of Cox Communications (1979–1983), president at General Electric (1983–1984), president and CEO of GE Capital (1984–1986), chairman and CEO of NBC (1986–2004), vice chairman of General Electric (2000–2008), chairman and CEO of NBCUniversal (2004–2007), and co-founder and chairman of Autism Speaks (2005–2015)

== Other ==
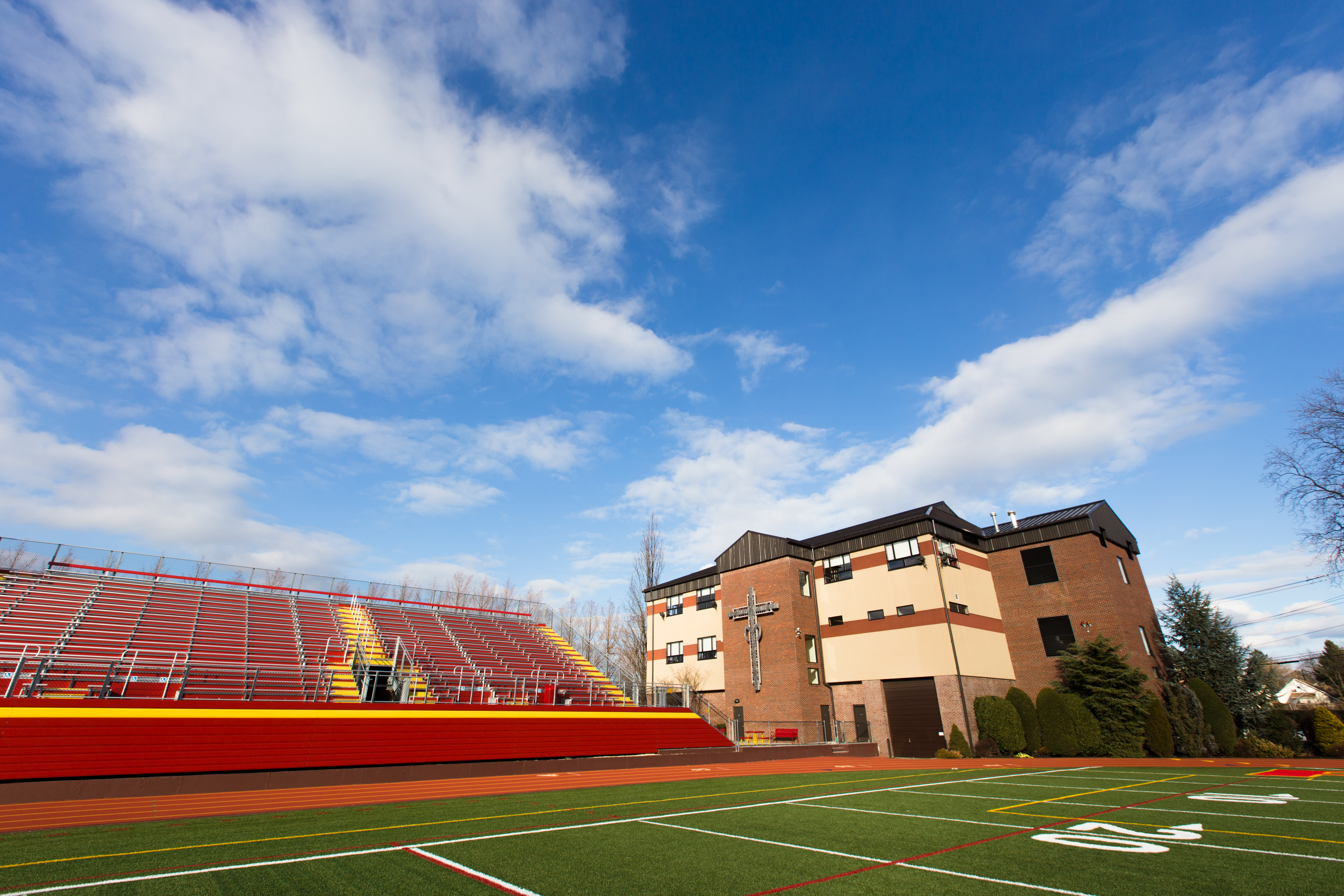
Chaminade's Marianist Cross, Physical Fitness Center (PFC), and Gold Star Stadium from Ott Field

- Chaminade houses a theater organ that has 3 manuals and 15 ranks. It is housed in the school's 1,200-seat Darby Auditorium. The organ consists of a Robert Morton console with ranks by Wurlitzer, Robert Morton, Austin, and Barton.
- A renovation of Chaminade's athletic facilities was completed in 2014. This included the replacement of artificial turf on Ott Field and the construction of a new stadium adjacent to Ott Field. Gold Star Stadium was dedicated on September 6, 2014, in honor of the Gold Star Alumni.
- The Dolan Family Science, Technology and Research Center (STRC) opened in 2018, including state-of-the-art science labs and the only Foucault pendulum in a high school in New York.
- The Bloomberg Financial Lab in the main school building contains the most Bloomberg Terminals of any high school in the nation.
- In partnership with Shared Studios, Chaminade operates a "Noro portal" that aims to connect students with other students and educators around the world to discuss various topics.
