= Meile Rockefeller =

American lawyer

- Born: Meile Louise Rockefeller; December 5, 1955 (age 70); Brooklyn, New York, U.S.
- Education: Williams College (BA); New York University (JD)
- Occupations: lawyer, philanthropist, real-estate developer, heiress
- Years active: 1977–present
- Parent(s): Rodman Rockefeller; Barbara Olsen

Meile Louise Rockefeller (born December 5, 1955) is an American lawyer, philanthropist, heiress, and real-estate developer. She is the daughter of Rodman Clark Rockefeller and his first wife, Barbara Ann Olsen. Her paternal grandfather was New York Governor and U.S. Vice President Nelson Aldrich Rockefeller. She is a member of the Rockefeller family.

== Education ==
Rockefeller earned a bachelor's degree in political economics from Williams College in 1979 and a Juris Doctor (J.D.) degree from New York University.

== Career ==
Rockefeller is a lawyer, real-estate developer, drug law reformer, and serves on the board of the Counseling Service of the Eastern District of New York.

== Political protest ==
In 2002, at age 46, Rockefeller was arrested for protesting the "Rockefeller drug laws" which bear the name of her grandfather, who secured their passage as governor of the state of New York in 1973. She was accompanied by her brother, Stuart Rockefeller, and was supported by other members of the family on the issue, including her granduncle Laurance Rockefeller.

== See also ==
- Rockefeller family
- Nelson Rockefeller
