= Abacus: Small Enough to Jail =

2016 American film by Steve James

- Theatrical release poster
- Directed by: Steve James
- Produced by: Mark Mitten; Julie Goldman
- Cinematography: Tom Bergmann
- Edited by: John Farbrother; David E. Simpson
- Music by: Joshua Abrams
- Production companies: Mitten Media; Motto Pictures; Kartemquin Films Production
- Distributed by: PBS Distribution; Frontline; ITVS
- Release dates: September 11, 2016 (TIFF); May 19, 2017 (United States)
- Running time: 88 minutes
- Country: United States
- Language: English
- Box office: $80,527

Abacus: Small Enough to Jail is a 2016 American documentary film directed by Steve James. The film centers on the Abacus Federal Savings Bank, a family-owned community bank situated in Manhattan's Chinatown in New York City. Because it was deemed "small enough to jail" rather than "too big to fail", it became the only financial institution to actually face criminal charges following the subprime mortgage crisis.

The film premiered at the 2016 Toronto International Film Festival, where it was first runner-up for the People's Choice Award in the documentary category. It aired on the PBS documentary series Frontline in 2017 and is available for online streaming at no charge. The film was nominated for Best Documentary Feature at the 90th Academy Awards.

== Synopsis ==
The documentary features interviews with the Sung family and other past and present Abacus employees, New York County District Attorney Cyrus Vance Jr. and his staff, and defense lawyers Kevin Puvalowski and Rusty Wing. The documentary also features some history on Abacus, inter-cut with scenes from It's a Wonderful Life—a source of founder/chairman Thomas Sung's inspiration as he founded the institution and steered it through a bank run in 2003. The documentary also sheds light upon many Chinese American business dealings, such as cash-only shops and restaurants that do not report full income to the IRS, parents giving "gifts" to their children in lieu of loans, and the distinction between a person or entity's legal name versus the colloquial or personal name. Neil Barofsky, former Special United States Treasury Department Inspector General overseeing the Troubled Assets Relief Program (TARP), notes that many Abacus borrowers and loan officers may have misrepresented loan applications, which technically constitutes a crime, but nonetheless the loans had a very low rate of default, unlike typical mortgage fraudsters that have no intent of repaying a loan. Barofsky also points out that there was never any general prosecution of widespread subprime mortgages and collateralized debt obligations, done to maximize profit without regard to risk, despite their much bigger impact on society and economy compared to Abacus Bank's lending practices.

== Critical response ==
Abacus received generally positive reviews from critics. On Rotten Tomatoes the film has a rating of 93%, based on 72 reviews, with an average rating of 7.51/10.The website's critical consensus states, "Abacus: Small Enough to Jail transcends its less-than-dramatic trappings to present a gripping real-life legal thriller with far-reaching implications". On Metacritic, the film has a score of 73 out of 100, based on 16 critics, indicating "generally favorable" reviews.

Matt Zoller Seitz of RogerEbert.com declared Abacus to be "another classic" from Steve James, giving the film four out of four stars. He praised James' "knack for finding the universal within the specific, and often a much larger and more complex story nestled within a specific account of one event." Seitz also pointed out that even though the film is engrossing as a legal thriller, "it's even more notable as a portrait of a community. James... has constructed a rich and revealing context for this tale, and it's one that is rarely showcased in American cinema.... a thriving community [Chinatown] that defines itself in relation the mainstream of American culture and that is aspirational but never entirely comfortable or accepted."

Ignatiy Vishnevetsky of The A.V. Club, however, gave the film a C+, considering it to be "pleasant" yet "inessential", with its "unusually literal" documentary style applied to a narrative that could have been efficiently told in a magazine article. Vishnevetsky stated that "[p]erhaps the problem is that he isn’t one to extrapolate, interrogate, or pry subjects open; his best films are chronicles of hopes, dreams, and hardships made possible by the trust James works to elicit from his subjects."

The Guardian critic wrote that "engrossing tale of the bank that was bullied" and gave four stars out of five.

== See also ==
- List of American films of 2016
