= Elaine Bartlett =

African American activist from Harlem

Elaine Bartlett is an African American activist from Harlem who was charged with a first offense felony for selling cocaine in 1983. Bartlett, a mother of four children, spent sixteen years in the Bedford Hills prison in New York.

During the time of Bartlett's arrest, New York had just undergone major changes with their drug laws. The controversial Rockefeller drug laws caused an upset and caused many to second-guess the motives of the criminal justice system.

While Bartlett was in prison, she became involved with multiple activities to keep busy. In 1999, while still in prison, Bartlett obtained her associate degree from Mercy College.

After her release in 2000, Bartlett found that her family did not have the resources necessary to be successful, but states that she was determined to be successful. She became an activist to repeal the Rockefeller drug laws. Bartlett helped found the Mothers of the Disappeared which is an advocacy group aiming for repeal of the drug laws. She has advocated to New York state legislators, delivered speeches at rallies, and attended anti-drug law events in Washington D.C., Philadelphia, and Texas.

== Life on the Outside (2004) ==
A 2004 book by Jennifer Gonnerman, Life on the Outside (ISBN 9780312424572), tells the story of Bartlett's crime, her time in prison, the effect of incarceration on family members, and her re-entry into society.
