= Allison Whipple Rockefeller =

American conservationist

- Born: Allison Hall Whipple; November 20, 1958 (age 67); Manhattan, New York, U.S.
- Education: B.A. Hamilton College 1980
- Alma mater: Trinity-Pawling School
- Occupations: Philanthropist, conservationist
- Spouse: Peter C. Rockefeller
- Relatives: Rodman Rockefeller (father-in-law); George Whipple III (brother)
- Family: Rockefeller family

Allison Hall Whipple Rockefeller (November 20, 1958) is an American conservationist.

== Early life and education ==
She is the daughter of advertising executive George Carroll Whipple Jr. and JoeAnn Whipple. She graduated from Trinity-Pawling School and received a B.A. from Hamilton College in 1980. In 1987, She married Peter Clark Rockefeller, a son of Rodman C. and Barbara Olsen Rockefeller of New York; and grandson of Nelson A. Rockefeller, a New York Governor and U.S. vice president. She is the sister of lawyer and NY1 society reporter George Whipple III.

The Whipple family is descended from John Whipple, an early settler in the Massachusetts Bay Colony, and became established in the Colony of Rhode Island and Providence Plantations. Through her father, she is a descendant of Senator Daniel Webster, founding father William Whipple, and signers of the United States Declaration of Independence Charles Carroll of Carrollton and Stephen Hopkins.

== Career ==
Much of Rockefeller's work has focused on parks and open space on the national, regional and community level; community and main street revitalization; supporting girls and women working in the environment, and by recognizing excellence in women's environmental leadership.

Rockefeller has served as the first alumna board chair of the Student Conservation Association; she has served as a Commission Member for the New York State Department of Parks, Recreation, and Historic Preservation under four governors; and she is a longtime board member of the Central Park Conservancy's Women Committee. She is Founder of the National Audubon Society's Women In Conservation program, Founder of the program's Rachel Carson Awards Council, and Founding Chair of the Rachel Carson Award.

Rockefeller also is the Founder of Cornerstone Parks, the Pumps-to-Parks Initiative designed to create a network of small parks and community centers from the more than 150,000 abandoned gas stations in towns across the United States.

Rockefeller's most recent work includes an effort to add information about citizen ownership of our national parks and public lands to the U.S. citizenship exam, introducing new immigrants to American environmental stewardship; and co-authoring Ten Principles on Conservation, a campaign aimed at reducing severe public partisanship over the environment by emphasizing common values. She is also working on the Human Rights Symbols Campaign, an awareness campaign aimed at educating mainstream American citizens about the top ten global human rights issues. The Human Rights Handbook and its ten Human Rights Symbols are intended to engage and mobilize young people to express global citizenship with human rights activism.

Rockefeller is a contributing blogger for The Huffington Post.

== Awards and honors ==
In March 2013, Rockefeller was a speaker at the Environmental Protection Agency's Women In The Environment Summit hosted by the White House.

She was a 2013 recipient of the National Audubon Society's The Thomas Keesee, Jr. Conservation Award.

Rockefeller was honored at the Museum of the City of New York's Director's Council Fall Reception in 2012.

Allison Whipple Rockefeller was a 2009 Honoree of the Horticultural Society of New York's Award of Excellence at their annual Fall Luncheon.

== Personal life ==
On December 20, 1987, Whipple married Peter Clark Rockefeller at the All Saints Chapel of the Trinity-Pawling School in Pawling, New York. They have three children:

- William Rockefeller (b. 1984), a self-employed audio engineer
- Hall Rockefeller (b. 1987), an art historian
- Lily Rockefeller (b. 1990), an author/writer based in New York
