= Mike Vaccaro =

American sportswriter

- Born: Michael Vaccaro Jr. January 2, 1967 (age 59); West Hempstead, New York, U.S.
- Education: Chaminade High School
- Alma mater: St. Bonaventure University
- Spouse: Leigh Hursey
- Writing career
- Subject: Sports

Michael Vaccaro Jr. (January 2, 1967) has been the lead sports columnist for the New York Post since November 2002. Previously, he has worked as a columnist at The Star-Ledger, The Kansas City Star, and the Times Herald-Record of Middletown, New York. He was also a sports editor of the Northwest Arkansas Times, and was appointed to that position in 1991.

Vaccaro has won over 50 writing awards since beginning his career in 1989 as a reporter for the Olean Times Herald, where his primary beat was St. Bonaventure University basketball.

== Early life and career ==
Born in West Hempstead, New York, on January 2, 1967, Vaccaro is the son of Michael and Ann McMahon Vaccaro. His first published work appeared in 1979, a sports cartoon submitted at age 12 to New York Newsday's "Kidsday" page, which led, that summer, to employment that summer, credited as "Kidsday Staff Artist". Vaccaro later attended Chaminade High School and St. Bonaventure University, graduating in 1989.

Between 2005 and 2009, Vaccaro authored three books, including Emperors and Idiots: The Hundred Year Rivalry Between the Yankees and Red Sox, From the Very Beginning to the End of the Curse, followed, two years later, by 1941: The Greatest Year in Sports, and, in 2009, by his in-depth recreation of the 1912 World Series, The First Fall Classic : The Red Sox, the Giants, and the Cast of Players, Pugs, and Politicos who Reinvented the World Series in 1912. 2026 saw the publication of Vaccaro's next book, Bosses of the Bronx : The Endless Drama of the Yankees Under the House of Steinbrenner.

== Personal life ==
In the opening "Acknowledgments" section of his first published book (Emperors and Idiots in 2005), Vaccaro concludes with one directed towards his wife, the former Leigh Hursey, whose smile on the day that work was published is characterized as "matched in my memory only by the one I wore the day I met her". As of 2007, the couple resided in Hillsdale, New Jersey.
