= Tim Berbenich =

American football coach (born 1979)

Pittsburgh Steelers
- Title: Game management & quarterbacks

Personal information
- Born: December 19, 1979 (age 46); Huntington, New York, U.S.

Career information
- Position: Wide receiver
- High school: Chaminade (NY)
- College: Hamilton

Career history

Coaching
- New York Jets (2003–2005); Offensive assistant (2003–2004); Offensive quality control coach (2005); Tampa Bay Buccaneers (2006–2011); Offensive quality control coach (2006–2007); Assistant running backs coach (2008); Assistant wide receivers coach (2009–2011); Indianapolis Colts (2013–2017); Offensive assistant (2013–2014); Defensive assistant (2015); Offensive assistant & assistant quarterbacks coach (2016–2017); Oakland / Las Vegas Raiders (2018–2021); Offensive quality control coach (2018–2020); Running backs coach (2021); Houston Texans (2022) Tight ends coach; Los Angeles Rams (2023) Coaching analyst; Atlanta Falcons (2024–2025) Pass game specialist & game management; Pittsburgh Steelers (2026–present) Game management & quarterbacks

Operations
- New York Jets (2000–2002); Operations intern (2000–2001); Operations assistant (2002)

Tim Berbenich (born December 19, 1979) is an American football coach who is currently the game management and quarterbacks coach for the Pittsburgh Steelers of the National Football League (NFL).

== Coaching career ==
=== New York Jets ===
Berbenich began his career with the New York Jets in their operations office before transitioning to an offensive assistant position.

=== Tampa Bay Buccaneers ===
Berbenich moved on as an offensive quality control coach for the Tampa Bay Buccaneers, working under former Jets offensive coordinator Paul Hackett, who was the Buccaneers quarterbacks coach at the time.

=== Indianapolis Colts ===
Berbenich was hired as an offensive assistant for the Indianapolis Colts in 2013 working under offensive coordinator Pep Hamilton, who he shared an office with when they were with the Jets. He was promoted to assistant quarterbacks coach in 2016.

=== Oakland / Las Vegas Raiders ===
Berbenich was hired as an offensive quality control coach for the Oakland Raiders in 2018, reuniting with Gruden. He was promoted to running backs coach in 2021 after Kirby Wilson announced his retirement.

=== Houston Texans ===
Berbenich was hired as an tight ends coach for the Houston Texans on February 21, 2022.

=== Los Angeles Rams ===
After leaving Houston, Berbenich joined the Los Angeles Rams as a coaching analyst.

=== Atlanta Falcons ===
On February 3, 2024, Berbenich joined the Falcons' staff under new head coach Raheem Morris as assistant for pass game specialist and game management.

=== Pittsburgh Steelers ===
On February 13, 2026, the Pittsburgh Steelers hired Berbenich to serve as the team's game management/quarterbacks coach under new head coach Mike McCarthy.
