= Oday Aboushi =

American football player (born 1991)

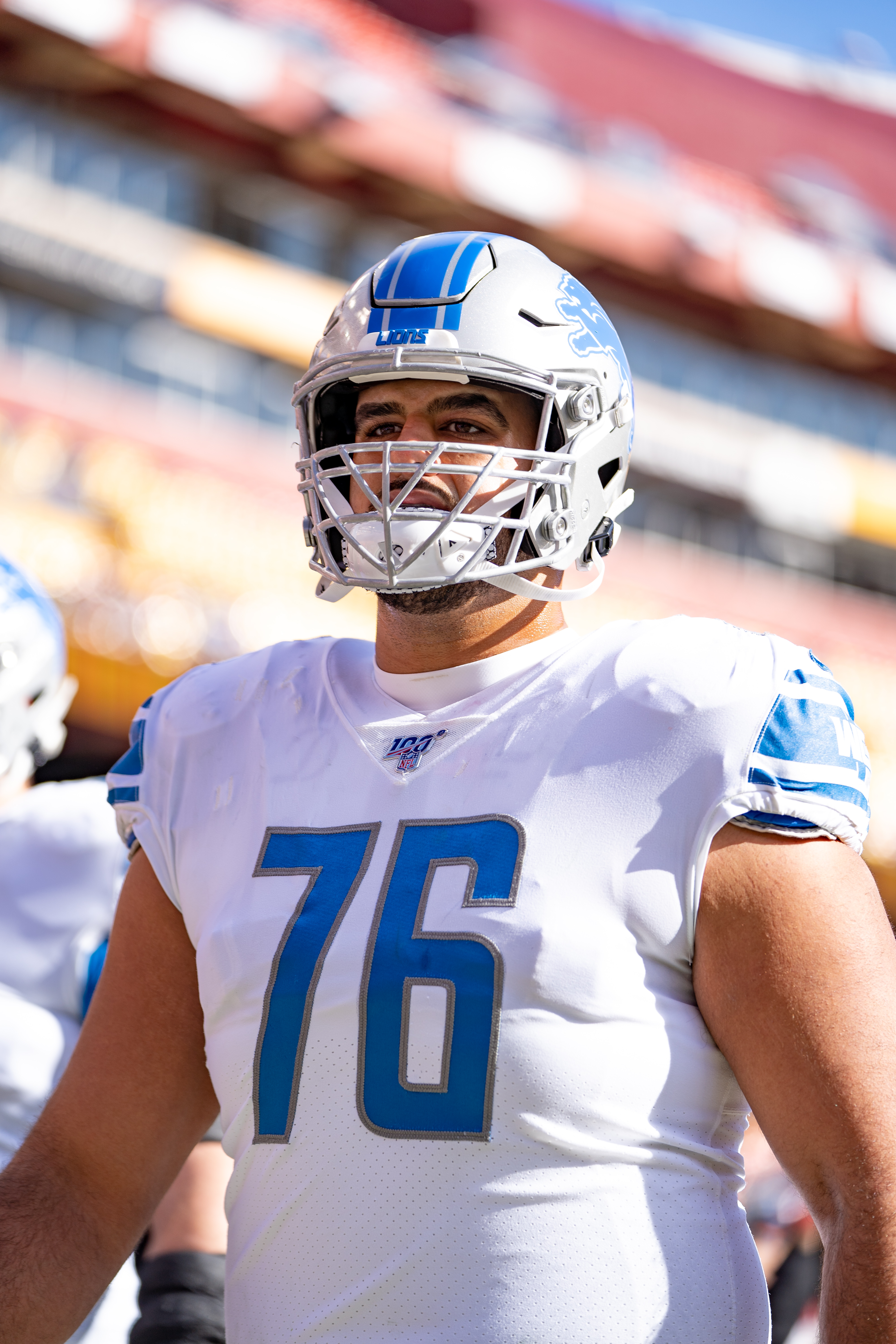
- Aboushi with the Detroit Lions in 2019

No. 75, 78, 70, 76, 63
- Position: Offensive guard

Personal information
- Born: June 5, 1991 (age 35); Brooklyn, New York, U.S.
- Listed height: 6 ft 5 in (1.96 m)
- Listed weight: 308 lb (140 kg)

Career information
- High school: Xaverian (Brooklyn)
- College: Virginia
- NFL draft: 2013: 5th round, 141st overall pick

Career history
- New York Jets (2013–2015); Houston Texans (2015–2016); Seattle Seahawks (2017); Oakland Raiders (2018)*; Arizona Cardinals (2018); Detroit Lions (2019–2020); Los Angeles Chargers (2021); Los Angeles Rams (2022)
- * Offseason or practice squad member only

Awards and highlights
- First-team All-ACC (2012); Second-team All-ACC (2011)

Career NFL statistics
- Games played: 85
- Games started: 51
- Stats at Pro Football Reference

Oday Aboushi (born June 5, 1991) is a Palestinian-American former American football offensive guard. He played college football at Virginia and was selected by the New York Jets in the fifth round of the 2013 NFL draft. He was also a member of the Houston Texans, Seattle Seahawks, Oakland Raiders, Arizona Cardinals, Detroit Lions, Los Angeles Chargers, and Los Angeles Rams.

== Early life ==
Aboushi was born in Sunset Park, New York in Brooklyn. He attended Xaverian High School in Brooklyn, where he was a member of the Xaverian high school football team.

College recruiting
Name	Hometown	School	Height	Weight	40^{‡}	Commit date
Oday Aboushi; Offensive tackle	Brooklyn, New York	Xaverian High School	6 ft 6 in (1.98 m)	300 lb (140 kg)	5.2	Jan 8, 2009
Oday Aboushi; Offensive tackle	Recruit ratings: Scout: Rivals:					
Overall recruit ranking: Scout: 15 (OT) Rivals: – (National), 23 (OT), 1 (NY)
‡ Refers to 40-yard dash; Note: In many cases, Scout, Rivals, 247Sports, On3, and ESPN may conflict in their listings of height, weight and 40 time.; In these cases, the average was taken. ESPN grades are on a 100-point scale.; Sources: "Virginia Football Commitments". Rivals.; "2009 Virginia Football Recruiting Commits". Scout.; "Scout.com Team Recruiting Rankings". Scout.; "2009 Team Ranking". Rivals.com.

== College career ==
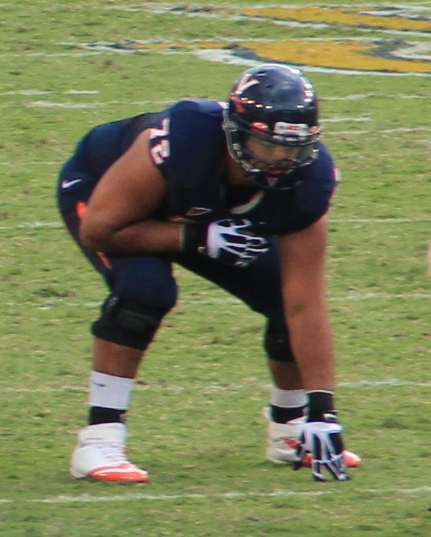
Aboushi with Virginia in 2012

Aboushi attended the University of Virginia, where he played for the Virginia Cavaliers football team from 2009 to 2012. During his college career, he started 37 of 43 games in which he appeared. As a senior in 2012, he was a first-team All-Atlantic Coast Conference (ACC) selection.

== Professional career ==
Pre-draft measurables
Height	Weight	Arm length	Hand span	40-yard dash	10-yard split	20-yard split	20-yard shuttle	Three-cone drill	Vertical jump	Broad jump	Bench press
6 ft 5 3/8 in (1.97 m)	308 lb (140 kg)	33 7/8 in (0.86 m)	10 5/8 in (0.27 m)	5.41 s	1.89 s	3.16 s	4.77 s	7.92 s	23.5 in (0.60 m)	8 ft 4 in (2.54 m)	21 reps
All values from NFL Combine/Pro Day

=== New York Jets ===
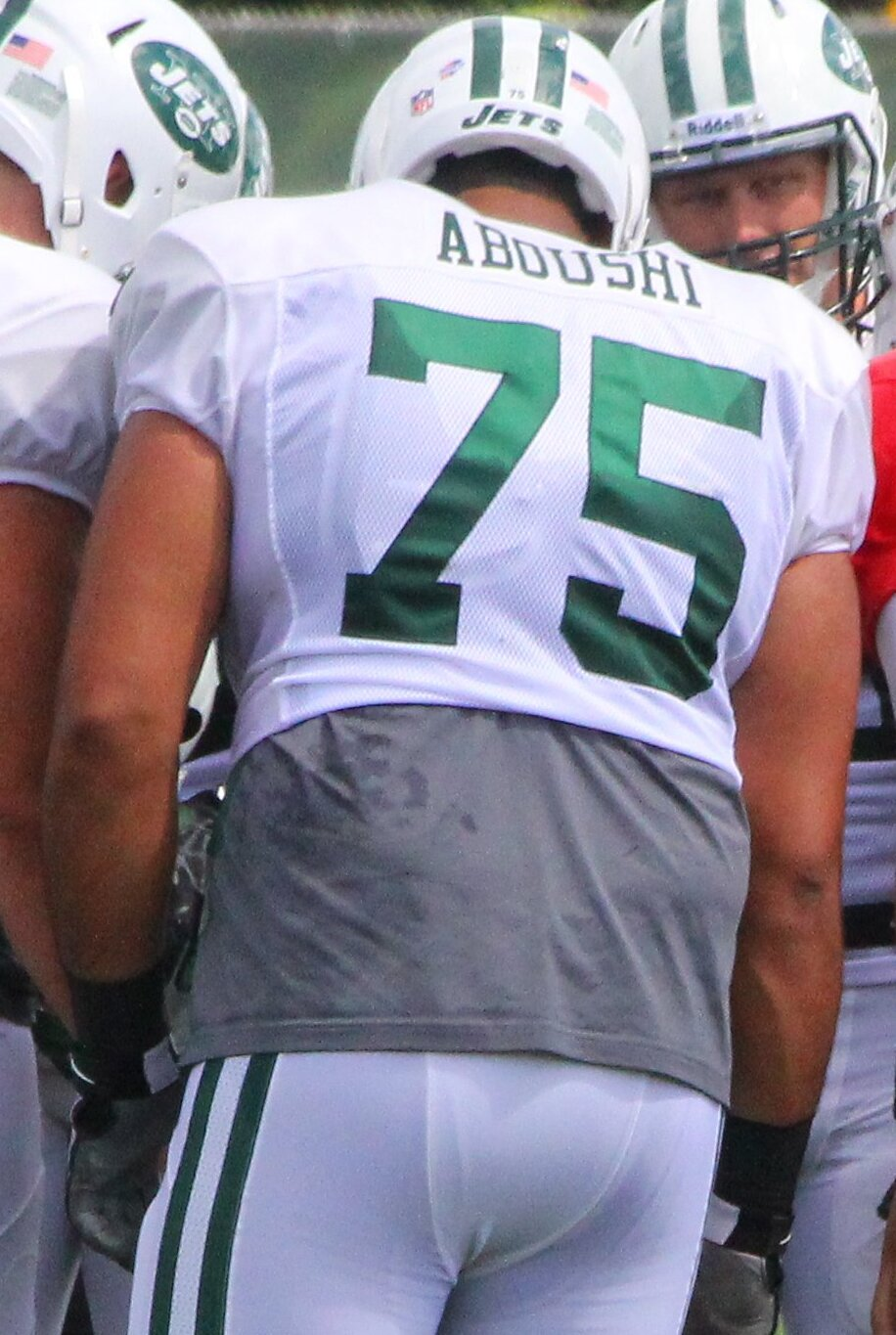
Aboushi with the Jets in 2013

The New York Jets selected Aboushi in the fifth round, with the 141st overall pick, of the 2013 NFL draft. The Jets signed him to a four-year rookie contract on May 10, 2013; financial terms were not disclosed.

Aboushi was inactive in 2013 for all 16 regular season games with the Jets. In 2014, he started 10 games after the starter was injured.

Aboushi was suspended without pay (about $34,400) for the first game of the 2015 season for violating the NFL Policy and Program for Substances of Abuse, in August 2015. Aboushi was released by the Jets on September 15, 2015, one day after his suspension for violating the NFL's substance abuse policy ended.

=== Houston Texans ===
The Houston Texans claimed Aboushi off of waivers on September 16, 2015.

=== Seattle Seahawks ===
On March 17, 2017, Aboushi signed with the Seattle Seahawks. He started eight games at right guard before suffering a dislocated shoulder injury in Week 15. He was placed on injured reserve on December 13, 2017.

=== Oakland Raiders ===
On July 28, 2018, Aboushi signed with the Oakland Raiders reuniting him with his previous year offensive line coach Tom Cable. He was released on September 1, 2018.

=== Arizona Cardinals ===
On October 23, 2018, Aboushi signed with the Arizona Cardinals.

=== Detroit Lions ===
On March 14, 2019, Aboushi signed a one-year, $2 million contract with the Detroit Lions. On March 27, 2020, he re-signed with the Lions. He was released during final roster cuts on September 5, 2020, but re-signed with the team the next day. He was fined $5,221 by the NFL for unnecessary roughness in Week 2.

=== Los Angeles Chargers ===
On March 20, 2021, Aboushi signed with the Los Angeles Chargers. He was named the Chargers starting right guard for the 2021 season. However, he suffered a torn ACL in Week 5 and was placed on season-ending injured reserve on October 12, 2021.

=== Los Angeles Rams ===
On September 14, 2022, Aboushi signed with the practice squad of the Los Angeles Rams. He was promoted to the active roster six days later. He was suspended for one game on December 26, following a post–game fight with Randy Gregory. His suspension was overturned a day later.

== Personal life ==
Aboushi is the ninth of ten children born to Palestinian parents who immigrated to New York from Beit Hanina, a Palestinian neighborhood in East Jerusalem. He is the brother of civil rights lawyer and Democratic candidate for Manhattan District Attorney Tahanie Aboushi. He speaks English and Arabic.

He is a practicing Muslim, one of few in the NFL. During Ramadan, which fell during training camp season at Virginia, he fasted from dawn to sunset most days. He was one of about a dozen Muslim athletes honored by the U.S. Department of State for contributions in 2011. He is one of the first Palestinian players in the NFL.

On July 12, 2013, the Jewish NGO the Anti-Defamation League issued a press release defending Aboushi after an article circulating online claimed he was a 'Muslim extremist'. The ADL defended Aboushi's right to take 'pride in his Palestinian heritage' and emphatically stated that being pro-Palestinian is in no way equivalent to being anti-Semitic or a Muslim extremist.

== See also ==
- List of suspensions in the National Football League
