= Alvin Bragg =

American lawyer and politician (born 1973)

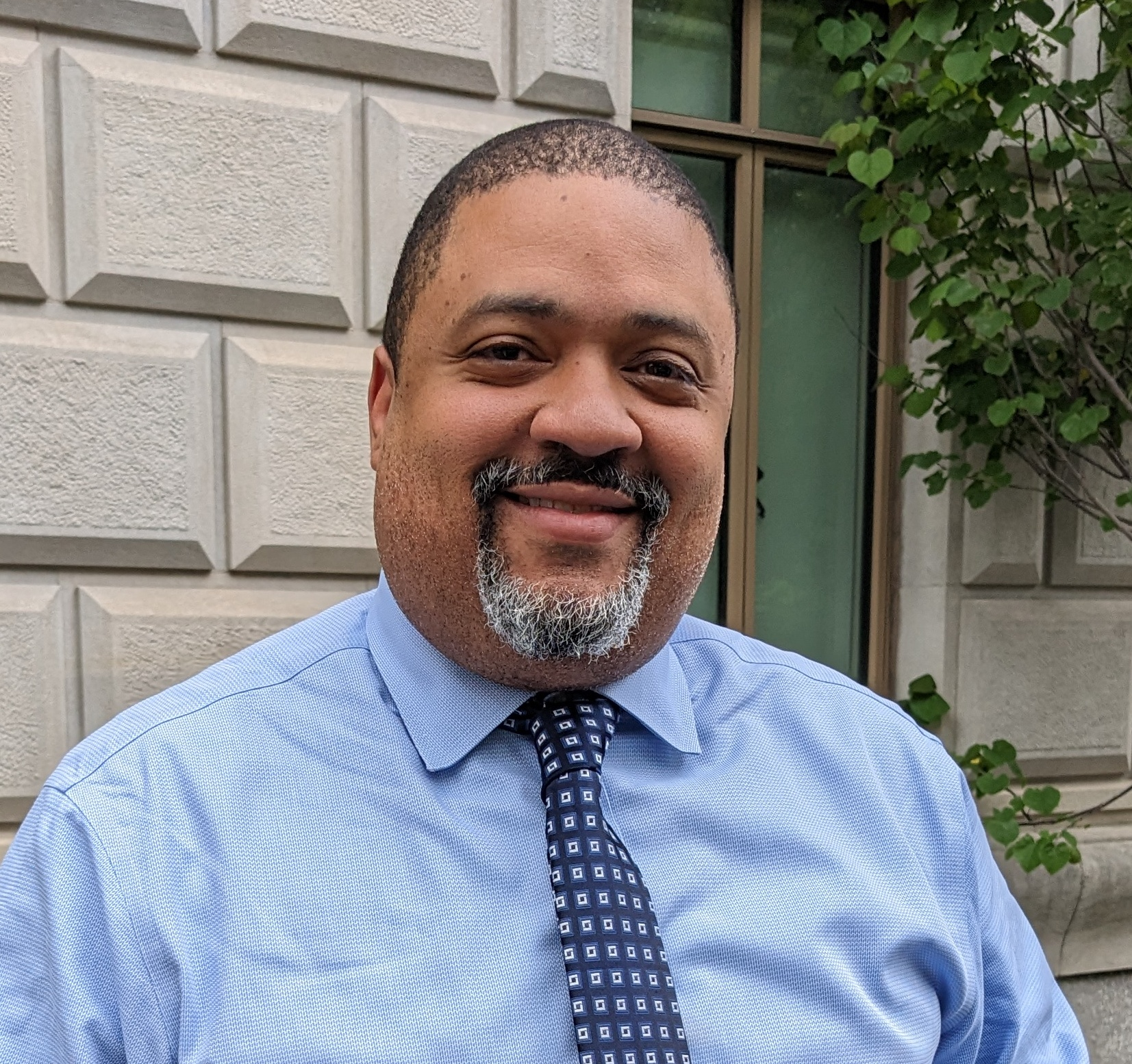
- Bragg in 2023

37th District Attorney of New York County
- Incumbent
- Assumed office January 1, 2022
- Preceded by: Cyrus Vance Jr.

Personal details
- Born: Alvin Leonard Bragg Jr. October 21, 1973 (age 53) New York City, U.S.
- Party: Democratic
- Spouse: Jamila Ponton (m. 2003)
- Children: 2
- Education: Harvard University (BA, JD)

Alvin Leonard Bragg Jr. (born October 21, 1973) is an American politician and lawyer who serves as the New York County District Attorney, covering Manhattan. In 2021, he became the first African American elected to that office. Bragg had previously served as Chief Deputy Attorney General of New York and as an Assistant United States Attorney in the Southern District of New York. In 2024, he became the first and only district attorney to secure a conviction of a former United States president.

== Early life and education ==
Bragg was born in New York City on October 21, 1973. He hails from Harlem and grew up on Striver's Row. In an interview with The American Prospect, Bragg said that he had been "deeply affected by the criminal justice system – most directly through three gunpoint stops by the NYPD". He graduated from the Trinity School before attending Harvard College.

He graduated with a Bachelor of Arts, cum laude, in 1995 with a major in government. In 1999, he earned a Juris Doctor from Harvard Law School, where he was an editor of the Harvard Civil Rights–Civil Liberties Law Review.

== Legal career ==
After graduating from law school, Bragg spent a year as a law clerk for judge Robert P. Patterson Jr. of the U.S. District Court for the Southern District of New York. He then joined the law firm Morvillo Abramowitz Grand Iason & Anello as an associate, where his work focused on white collar fraud and civil rights issues. In 2003, he joined the office of the Attorney General of New York under Eliot Spitzer before becoming the chief of litigation and investigations for the New York City Council. In 2009, Bragg left the city council to serve as assistant United States Attorney in the Southern District of New York.

In 2017, Eric Schneiderman, then serving as attorney general, appointed Bragg Chief Deputy Attorney General of New York. Bragg ran the criminal justice and social justice divisions, overseeing lawsuits brought by the state against the Donald J. Trump Foundation, Harvey Weinstein and The Weinstein Company, and the addition of a citizenship question on the 2020 United States census.

He left the position in December 2018 and became a professor at the New York Law School, where he was co-director of the Racial Justice Project. Bragg is a member of the board of directors for The Legal Aid Society. He has represented the families of Ramarley Graham and Eric Garner in civil litigation against New York City.

== New York County District Attorney ==
=== 2021 election ===
In June 2019, Bragg started his candidacy for the 2021 Democratic Party nomination for New York County District Attorney, then held by Cyrus Vance Jr., who did not run for reelection. Bragg ran as a supporter of criminal justice reform measures, and his campaign was characterized as one of the "campaigns of progressive prosecutors across the country".

His candidacy received the endorsement of The New York Times. Following the June 22, 2021 Democratic primary, Bragg led in the reported vote count and Tali Farhadian Weinstein conceded the primary to Bragg on July 2. On November 2, 2021, Bragg defeated Republican Thomas Kenniff in the general election, becoming the first African-American to be elected New York County District Attorney.

=== Tenure ===
Bragg was sworn into office on January 1, 2022.

==== Policies on low-level offenses ====
On January 4, 2022, after three days in office, he announced that his office would no longer prosecute low-level offenses such as fare evasion, resisting arrest, prostitution, and cannabis-related misdemeanors unless accompanied by a felony charge. He also decided to seek lesser charges for burglaries and store robberies where the offender "displays a dangerous instrument but does not create a genuine risk of physical harm". On January 20, Bragg disputed what he described was a "legalistic" interpretation of his prosecution policy memo and indicated that he supported a zero tolerance policy for violent crimes.

==== Donald Trump prosecution ====
On February 23, 2022, Carey R. Dunne and Mark F. Pomerantz, the lead prosecutors in the New York County District Attorney's investigation into Donald Trump and his businesses, resigned abruptly after Bragg "indicated to them that he had doubts about moving forward with a case against Mr. Trump". In his letter of resignation, Pomerantz wrote that the "team that has been investigating Mr. Trump harbors no doubt about whether he committed crimes, including falsifying business records, and that it was "a grave failure of justice" not to pursue criminal charges.

The New York Times reported that Bragg "balked at pursuing an indictment against Mr. Trump" and lacked confidence proving in court that Trump "knowingly falsified the value of his assets on annual financial statements". The Washington Post noted that Bragg was slow to meet with Dunne and Pomerantz after taking office and when they finally met to discuss the case, a source in the D.A.'s Office commented that Bragg seemed distracted and disengaged, continually checking his cell phone (allegations Bragg's spokesperson denied).

On November 21, 2022, The New York Times reported that the district attorney's office "has moved to jump-start its criminal investigation" into Trump's reported "hush-money payment to a porn star who said she had an affair with Mr. Trump". Bragg confirmed to CNN in January 2023 that the probe was ongoing. On January 30, the office presented evidence to a grand jury regarding Trump's role in the payment. Trump was indicted on March 30 and arraigned on April 4; it was the first indictment of a former president in United States history. Trump pleaded not guilty. Trump was found guilty of all counts on May 30, 2024, making Bragg the first prosecutor in U.S. history to secure a conviction against a former president.

==== Jose Alba prosecution ====
On July 7, 2022, Jose Alba, a 61-year-old bodega clerk, was attacked by customer Austin Simon in a dispute over a bag of potato chips. Alba attempted to de-escalate, but after being cornered behind the counter and being shoved into a wall, defended himself with a knife, killing the assailant. Police who investigated the incident described Alba's actions as self defense.

Bragg, in his prosecutorial discretion, charged Alba with murder and requested bail at $500,000. The judge initially set bail at $250,000, before lowering it to $50,000. The dead attacker's girlfriend also stabbed Alba with her own knife, after attempting to turn Alba's knife back on him. Bragg declined to charge her. After backlash, including from Mayor Eric Adams who said Alba was acting in self defense, Bragg ultimately dropped the charges against Alba, noting that "a homicide case against Alba could not be proven at trial beyond a reasonable doubt".

==== Steve Bannon prosecution ====
On September 6, 2022, The Washington Post reported that Steve Bannon would be indicted on September 8 by Bragg's prosecutors on the same charges of fraud that he was federally pardoned for by then-President Trump in 2020. On September 8, Bannon was charged with "defrauding Americans who wanted to contribute to construction of a southern border wall, resurrecting a threat that Mr. Bannon seemed to have escaped with a 2021 presidential pardon"; Bannon pleaded not guilty.

==== Daniel Penny prosecution ====
On May 3, 2024, Daniel Penny was charged with criminally negligent homicide and second degree manslaughter over the death of Jordan Neely. Penny was acquitted of negligent homicide in early December 2024, and his charge of second-degree manslaughter was dismissed by the presiding judge.

==== Security clearance revocation ====
On February 8, 2025, U.S. President Donald Trump announced that he would be revoking Bragg's security clearance, along with several other officials and attorneys, including Antony Blinken, Letitia James, Mark Zaid, Hillary Clinton, and former President Joe Biden. The decision followed Bragg's role in prosecuting Trump in a criminal case. In response, Bragg did not issue a public statement, but other officials affected by the decision considered the move to be politically motivated.

== Personal life ==
Bragg married Jamila Marie Ponton in 2003. They have two children. Bragg at one time taught Sunday School at the Abyssinian Baptist Church.

Legal offices
Preceded by Cyrus Vance Jr.	District Attorney of New York County; 2022–present	Incumbent
