= Rodman Rockefeller =

American businessman (1932–2000)

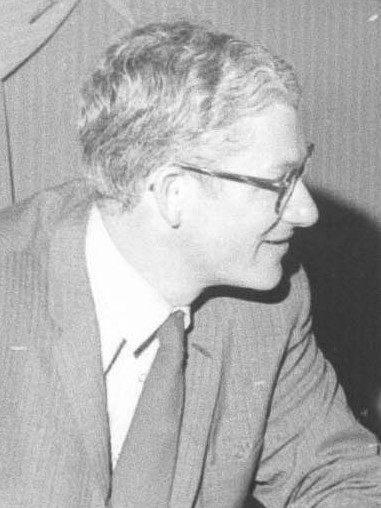
- Rodman Rockefeller in 1970.
- Born: Rodman Clark Rockefeller; May 2, 1932; Manhattan, New York, U.S.
- Died: May 14, 2000 (aged 68); Manhattan, New York, U.S.
- Education: Dartmouth College; Columbia University
- Spouses: Barbara Ann Olson (m. 1953; div. 1979) Sascha von Metzler (m. 1980)
- Children: 4, including Meile Rockefeller
- Parent(s): Nelson Rockefeller; Mary Clark
- Family: Rockefeller family

Rodman Clark Rockefeller (May 2, 1932 – May 14, 2000) was an American businessman and philanthropist. A fourth-generation member of the Rockefeller family, he was a son of former U.S. Vice President Nelson A. Rockefeller, a grandson of American financer John D. Rockefeller Jr., and a great-grandson of Standard Oil co-founder John D. Rockefeller.

== Early life and education ==
Rockefeller was born on May 2, 1932, in Manhattan, New York. He was the eldest son of former U.S. Vice President Nelson Aldrich Rockefeller (1908–1979) and his wife Mary Todhunter "Tod" Clark (1908–1999).

He was educated at Deerfield Academy, at Dartmouth College, and later earned a master's degree from Columbia University's Graduate School of Business Administration. At Dartmouth, his father's alma mater, he was a member of Green Key, co-edited Dartmouth's freshman handbook, and was elected to Phi Beta Kappa (as had been his grandfather, John D. Rockefeller Jr.)

== Career ==
Rockefeller was vice president (1968–1972) and chief executive (1972–1980) of the International Basic Economy Corporation, a New York based commercial genetics and agribusiness concern, founded by his father in 1946. Its activities included the development of corn production in Latin America, and the construction of thousands of low-cost homes in Mexico. He was chairman of IBEC Inc., a successor concern, from 1980 to 1985, and for a number of years was chairman of Arbor Acres Farm, based in Glastonbury, Connecticut, a seller of genetic material for poultry broiler stock.

Rockefeller was co-chairman of the Mexico-United States Business Committee, an organization focusing on economic and political issues of interest to both nations' business communities. Some consider the passage of the North American Free Trade Agreement in the mid-1990s to have been the culmination of his and the committee's efforts. The honors he received included a prestigious Mexican decoration, the Order of the Aztec Eagle.

He was on the board of the Rockefeller Brothers Fund for nine years, and for many years was a trustee of Rockefeller Financial Services, the entity which manages the family's office (known as "Room 5600"), its investment companies, and its many foundations. He was the head of the finance committee of Rockefeller Financial Services for many years and was a longtime trustee of Rockefeller Financial's holding company, Rockefeller & Company.

Rockefeller served as chairman of Pocantico Associates, a private capital and real estate investment company, and was a trustee of the Institute of International Education, the Thomas Jefferson Memorial Foundation, the Museum of Modern Art, the Americas Society, and the New York Blood Center.

== Personal life ==
In 1953, Rockefeller married Barbara Ann Olsen, with whom he had four children:

- Meile Rockefeller
- Peter C. Rockefeller
- Stuart Rockefeller
- Michael Rockefeller

The marriage ended in divorce in 1979, and the following year he married Alexandra (Sascha) von Metzler. In 1987, Rockefeller's son Peter married Allison Whipple.

Rockefeller died of cancer at his home on New York's Upper East Side on May 14, 2000.
