= Rockefeller Drug Laws =

New York state laws regarding drug crime

New York State Legislature
- Territorial extent: New York (state)
- Enacted by: New York State Legislature
- Enacted: May 8, 1973

Amended by
- 2004 Drug Law Reform Act
- Status: In force

The Rockefeller Drug Laws are the statutes dealing with the sale and possession of "narcotic" drugs in the New York State Penal Law. The laws are named after Nelson Rockefeller, who was the state's governor at the time the laws were adopted. Rockefeller had previously backed drug rehabilitation, job training and housing as strategies, having seen drugs as a social problem rather than a criminal one, but did an about-face during a period of mounting national anxiety about drug use and crime. Rockefeller, who pushed hard for the laws, was seen by some contemporary commentators as trying to build a "tough on crime" image in anticipation of a bid for the Republican presidential nomination in 1976. The bill was signed into law by Governor Rockefeller on May 8, 1973.

Under the Rockefeller drug laws, the penalty for selling two ounces (57 g) or more of heroin, morphine, "raw or prepared opium", cocaine, or cannabis or possessing four ounces (113 g) or more of the same substances, was a minimum of 15 years to life in prison, and a maximum of 25 years to life in prison. The original legislation also mandated the same penalty for committing a violent crime while under the influence of the same drugs, but this provision was subsequently omitted from the bill and was not part of the legislation Rockefeller ultimately signed. The section of the laws applying to marijuana was repealed in 1977, under the Democratic governor Hugh Carey.

The adoption of the Rockefeller drug laws gave New York State the distinction of having the most severe laws of this kind in the entire United States—an approach soon imitated by the state of Michigan, which, in 1978, enacted a "650-Lifer Law", which called for life imprisonment, without the possibility of parole for the sale, manufacture, or possession of at least 650 grams (1.43 lb) of cocaine or any Schedule I or Schedule II opiate.

By the 1980s, the drug laws were a major reason for increased incarceration in New York City, as the NYPD started policing street-level drug markets much more intensively.

== Background ==
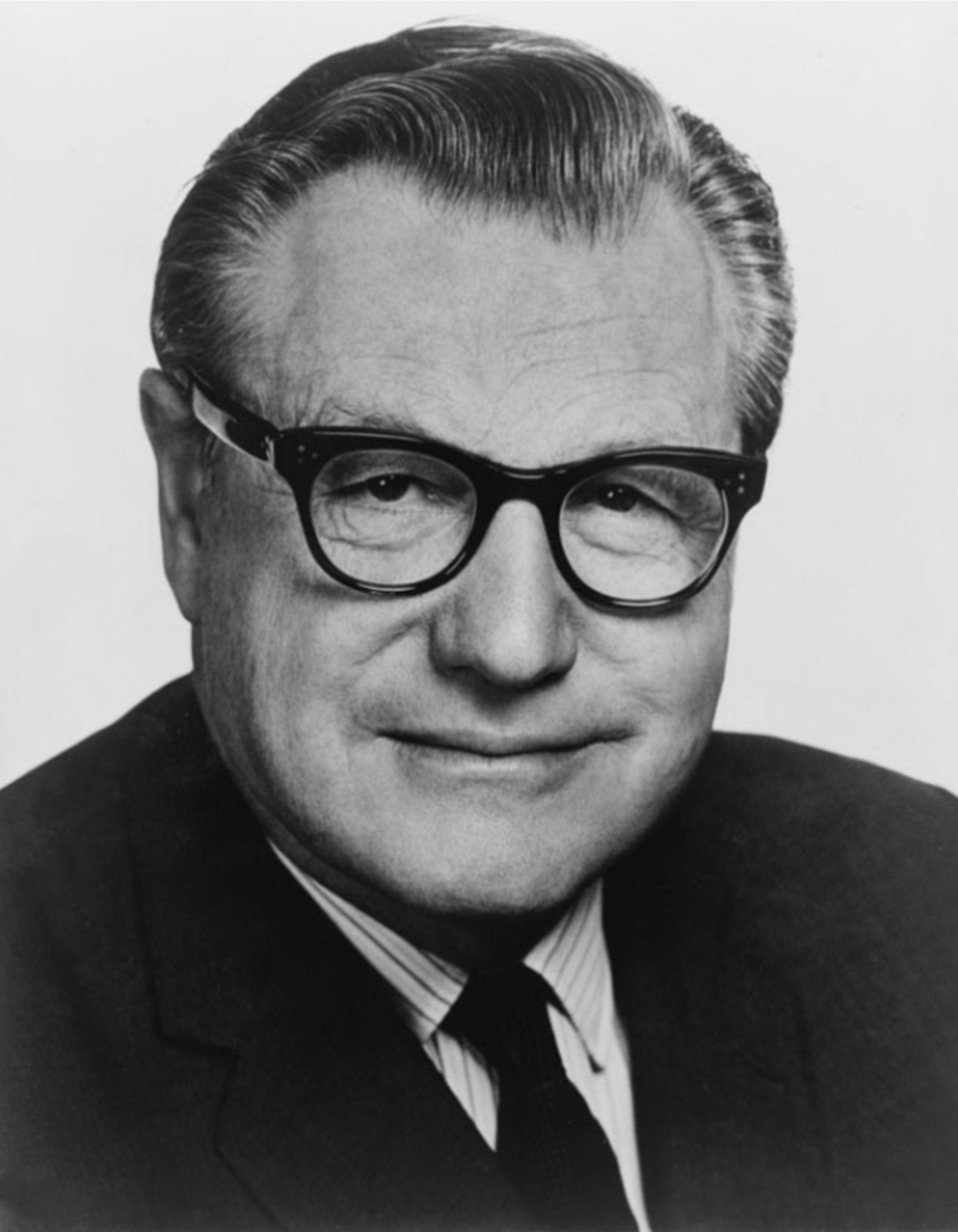
Nelson Rockefeller in 1974

While the Rockefeller Drug Laws went into effect in 1973, it had its roots in 1957. In that year, the Joint Legislative Committee on Narcotic Study commenced and would remain intact through the passage of the famous (or infamous, depending on one's point of view) Rockefeller Drug Laws in 1973. Testimony from minutes from a meeting in 1957 prove illustrative of findings of the committee. Arch Sayler, a probation officer in New York City, pointed to an overwhelming connection between drug users and the breaking of violations by those on parole or probation:

On November 27 (1957), we had 921 persons under supervision for civilian offenses of all kinds. Of these, 107 of 11.6 percent had a history of drug use. . .We found that this small group of drug users accounts for approximately 60 percent of our probation and parole violations. In other words, 11.5 percent of the people under supervision create 60 percent of the violations, and 85.5 percent, or the balance, make only 40 percent of the violations.

Furthermore, another, state-level committee was formed in 1967 with the intent on studying crime and corruption in general, with a particular nod to study "all phases of narcotics within the State, with the object in view of formulating and recommending remedial legislation as it may deem necessary to control the illegal use of narcotics and to provide for the care and treatment of addicts."

The committees annual reports increasingly focused on problems associated with narcotics. Particularly, the committee showed inextricable connections between narcotics and organized crime and presented it as a problem devastating New York City. A report in 1968 noted that "the most vicious activity of organized crime in the ghetto is traffic in narcotics, specifically heroin" and that "New York City has an estimated 65,000 to 75,000 heroin addicts." Most significant in connections to the punitiveness of the future Rockefeller Drug Laws, the committee expressed acute concern with the uptick in teenagers becoming addicted to heroin, and staggering death rates resulting from its use.

The laws were enacted at a time of mounting anxiety regarding drug addiction and crime, and arguments from some politicians that a draconian approach was needed. In 1971, President Richard Nixon declared in a White House briefing speech:

America's public enemy No. 1 in the United States is drug abuse. In order to fight and defeat this enemy, it is necessary to wage a new, all-out offensive.

However, reporter Dan Baum claimed, in 2016, that Nixon's former domestic-policy adviser, the long deceased John Ehrlichman, had told Baum during a 1994 interview:

The Nixon campaign in 1968, and the Nixon White House after that, had two enemies: the antiwar left and black people. You understand what I'm saying? We knew we couldn't make it illegal to be either against the war or black, but by getting the public to associate the hippies with marijuana and blacks with heroin, and then criminalizing both heavily, we could disrupt those communities. We could arrest their leaders, raid their homes, break up their meetings, and vilify them night after night on the evening news. Did we know we were lying about the drugs? Of course we did.

(Ehrlichman's children have disputed the account.)

== Criticism ==
Both the New York and Michigan statutes came under harsh criticism from both the political left and the political right. William F. Buckley, one of the most conservative public figures in America, was staunchly against it, as well as many in law enforcement, who saw inherent unfairness in placing the non-violent crime of drug trafficking on a par with murder. Economist Murray Rothbard called the laws "draconian: long jail sentences for heroin pushers and addicts. The Rockefeller program, which proved finally to be a fiasco, was the epitome of the belief in treating a social or medical problem with jail and the billy club." The laws also drew intense opposition from civil rights advocates, who claimed that they were racist, as they were applied inordinately to African-Americans and, to a lesser extent, Latinos.

In 2002, at age 46, Meile Rockefeller was arrested for protesting the Rockefeller drug laws. She was accompanied by her brother, Stuart Rockefeller, and was supported by other members of the family on the issue, including her grandfather's brother, Laurance Rockefeller.

== Incarceration rates ==
Due to the implementation of the Rockefeller drug laws, incarceration rates were said to have risen since their inception in 1973, 150,000 New Yorkers being imprisoned for non-violent drug offenses. Part of the reason for the rising incarceration rates was due to how the Rockefeller drug laws may have imposed harsher penalties for non-violent drug offenses, but crimes related to drug use did not decrease. Throughout the 1980s this was only made worse with the imposing drug laws on dawning the newly highly popularized drug of crack-cocaine, which is said to have "caused the New York State prison population to triple." As of 1973, the state's prison population was approximately at ten thousand, but with the help of the Rockefeller drug laws, by the year 2002 out of the approximately seventy thousand state inmates, "19,164 were incarcerated for drug offenses" which upon drug offenses alone had nearly doubled the state population of 1973.

Even despite the steady drop in crime rates that took place in the 1990s, the effects of the Rockefeller Drug Laws were the most transparent where "high arrest rates and prison commitments for drug offenses continued to fill prison cells." Another criticism of the Rockefeller drug laws has also been its distinct targeting of young minority males for as of the year 2000, black and Hispanic males made up over 90% of the population incarcerated by the Rockefeller Drug Laws.

== Michigan moderation ==
Michigan's statute was reformed somewhat in 1998, with the mandatory life sentence being reduced to a 20-year minimum.

== New York moderation ==
On December 14, 2004, New York governor George Pataki signed into law the Drug Law Reform Act (DLRA) (2004 N.Y. Laws Ch. 738 (effective January 13, 2005)), which replaced the indeterminate sentencing scheme of the Rockefeller Drug Laws with a determinate system. The DLRA also reduced the minimum penalty for conviction on the most serious (A-I felony) drug charge in New York from 15 years to life, to 8 to 20 years in prison. In addition, the weight thresholds for the two most serious possession offenses (A-I and A-II) were doubled (thus making them apply to fewer defendants), and those serving life sentences were permitted to apply for re-sentencing.

In his first State of the State address in January 2009, New York governor David Paterson was critical of the Rockefeller drug laws, stating, "I can't think of a criminal justice strategy that has been more unsuccessful than the Rockefeller drug laws."

In April 2009, the New York Penal Law and the New York Criminal Procedure Law were revised to remove the mandatory minimum sentences. Under the new law, judges now had the authority to sentence defendants convicted of drug offences on guilty plea to shorter sentences, probation or drug treatment - the last known as "Judicial Diversion". Prior to 2009, drug treatment was available at the discretion of prosecutors. The sentencing was made retroactive, which allowed over 1000 incarcerated defendants to apply for resentencing and possible release.

New York City has been called the cannabis-arrest capital of the world, with over 40,000 arrests in 2008. Despite New York's decriminalization of simple possession, New York City police arrest suspects for possession in public view, which remains a misdemeanor. During a Terry stop, officers may falsely suggest that a suspect should voluntarily reveal contraband to avoid arrest, then arrest the suspect if he reveals cannabis to public view. In 2008, the New York Civil Liberties Union criticized the crackdown for its cost and scope, its reliance on stop-and-frisks and police coercion to escalate simple possession into an arrestable offense, and the disproportionate number of young, black and Latino males arrested.

== Impoverished neighborhoods ==
One main criticism of these drug laws were that they put young minority males and females behind bars for carrying small amounts of drugs on them. These laws were a part of the "war on drugs" era and were meant to go after drug king pins, however it started to target lower level people as a means of keeping the streets clean. Elaine Bartlett and her story told in the book Life on the Outside critically depicts the effects of the Rockefeller Drug Laws and its policy on drug dealers.

== See also ==
- Law of New York
