= Tahanie Aboushi =

Palestinian-American civil rights attorney

- Born: October 6, 1985 (age 40); Brooklyn, New York, U.S.
- Education: St. John’s University (BS); Syracuse University (JD)
- Political party: Democratic
- Website: Campaign

Tahanie Aboushi is a Palestinian-American civil rights lawyer and partner at The Aboushi Law Firm in New York City with two of her siblings. She was a Democratic candidate for Manhattan District Attorney in the June 2021 Democratic primary election, finishing third in the primary. Aboushi's platform included plans to decline to prosecute charges stemming from poverty, mental illness, substance use, or sex work.

== Early life ==
Aboushi was born and raised in Brooklyn, New York after her parents immigrated from Palestine to the United States.

When Aboushi was 14 years old, her parents were arrested for conspiracy charges related to untaxed cigarettes. Her mother was acquitted, but her father was convicted in 1999 of charges related to the theft of trucks transporting cigarettes, including conspiracy to commit robbery, conspiracy to possess stolen property, theft from interstate shipment, and transportation of a stolen vehicle. He was subsequently sentenced to 22 years in federal prison. He was released in 2018.

She is the sister of former Los Angeles Chargers offensive guard Oday Aboushi.

== Education ==
Aboushi received her Bachelor in Science degree in Legal Studies from St. Johns University and received her Juris Doctor degree in 2009 from Syracuse University College of Law.

== Career ==
In 2010 Aboushi founded The Aboushi Law Firm where she handled notable civil rights cases.

Aboushi's experience as an attorney, a child of immigrants, and being Muslim led her to JFK Airport in Queens immediately following the announcement of President Donald Trump’s 2017 Executive Order 13769, one of the Trump travel bans, where she offered legal help to people who were affected by the order. New York State Senator Jesse Hamilton awarded Aboushi the Shirley Chisholm Women of Excellence Award for her extraordinary contributions to the community in this work.

Aboushi sued the New York City Police Department for violations of religious rights after police officers had forced women who were being criminally arraigned to remove their hijabs for mugshots while in police custody, in one case in the presence of inmates and other officers. Aboushi represented three women involved in separate cases claiming their religious rights were violated, and in 2018 the women received $60,000 each in the settlement with New York City.

Aboushi represented a 21-year-old woman who was hospitalized after being shoved to the ground by a New York City police officer during a May 2020 Black Lives Matter protest in Brooklyn. Video of the incident was captured by a Newsweek reporter and quickly became viral. After he shoved the woman, the officer was suspended without pay and charged by the Brooklyn DA with misdemeanor assault and other offenses. If convicted, he faces up to one year in jail. Six months later, Aboushi filed a federal civil rights lawsuit against the city, the officer, the officer's supervisor who witnessed the incident, and the New York City Police Department.

=== Manhattan District Attorney race ===
While Aboushi had significant victories throughout her career as a civil rights attorney, she wanted the opportunity to effect system-wide change through public office. Aboushi announced her campaign for New York County District Attorney in January 2020.

Had she been elected, Aboushi would have been the first woman, Muslim, and Palestinian American candidate to hold the office.
