= Abacus Federal Savings Bank =

American private bank

- Native name: 國寶銀行
- Type: Private
- Founded: December 1984; 41 years ago in New York City
- Founder: Thomas Sung
- Headquarters: 6 Bowery, New York, NY 10013, United States
- Number of locations: 5 (2026)
- Area served: New York State, New Jersey, Pennsylvania
- Key people: Thomas Sung (Chairman); Jill Sung (President and CEO)
- Products: Financial services
- Total assets: US$319,256,000 (Q1 2026)
- Website: www.abacusbank.com

Abacus Federal Savings Bank (Chinese: 國寶銀行) is an American bank founded in December 1984 by a group of business leaders from the Chinese American community in New York City.

Abacus was the only U.S. bank prosecuted in relation to the 2008 financial crisis; it was exonerated of all charges following a jury trial in 2015. The aggressive prosecution of Abacus, in contrast to the relatively lenient treatment received by "too big to fail" banks, was questioned and criticized by various media outlets.

A documentary about the prosecution and exoneration of Abacus, Abacus: Small Enough to Jail, was nominated for the 2018 Academy Award for Best Documentary Feature.

== Locations ==
The bank has locations in New York, New Jersey, and Pennsylvania.

== Other services ==
Abacus has a wholly owned insurance subsidiary, the Abacus Insurance Agency Corp. (AIAC), which provides life, health, accident, and annuity insurance. Abacus is federally chartered. Its mortgage and other services extend to all states in the United States.

== Prosecution and acquittal ==
=== Indictment ===
In May 2012, New York prosecutors from the Manhattan District Attorney's office indicted the bank and 19 of its employees on charges of fraud in relation to hundreds of millions of dollars' worth of mortgages that had been sold to Fannie Mae between 2005 and 2010. The bank was accused of falsifying loan applications so that borrowers would qualify for mortgages. Abacus argued that it uncovered the improper behavior itself, reported it to the regulator, and fired the employee in question. It also said it was not involved with the fraudulent packaging of subprime mortgage securities and had a mortgage default rate of 0.5%, a tenth of the national average.

=== Verdict ===
The bank, along with its former Chief Credit Officer and its former loan supervisor, were acquitted of all charges brought by the New York prosecutors in a jury trial in New York Supreme Court on June 3 and 4, 2015.

=== In media ===
The aggressive prosecution of Abacus, in contrast to the relatively lenient treatment received by large banks, was questioned and criticized by various media outlets. It was criticized by journalist Matt Taibbi in his 2014 book The Divide: American Injustice in the Age of the Wealth Gap. Jill Sung criticized the disparate treatment, including a perp walk, as blatant racism against Asian Americans.

The story is told in Steve James's feature-length documentary Abacus: Small Enough to Jail, which had its premiere at the Toronto International Film Festival, September 11, 2016. It was broadcast nationally on PBS Frontline on September 12, 2017. Abacus: Small Enough to Jail was nominated for the 2018 Academy Award for Best Documentary Feature.
