= Don Wilhelms =

American geologist (1930–2026)

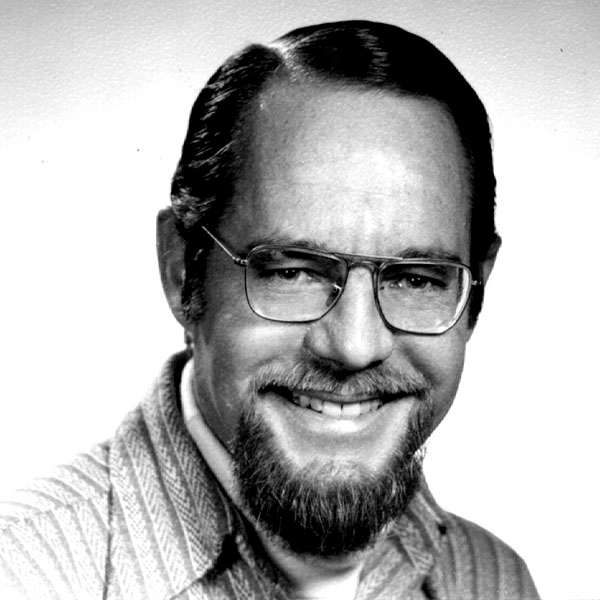
- Born: Don Edward Wilhelms; July 5, 1930; Los Angeles, California, U.S.
- Died: September 4, 2026 (aged 96); Palo Alto, California, U.S.
- Education: Pomona College
- Awards: G.K. Gilbert Award (1988); Shoemaker Distinguished Lunar Scientist Award
- Scientific career
- Fields: geology
- Workplaces: United States Geological Survey

Don Edward Wilhelms (July 5, 1930 – September 4, 2026) was an American United States Geological Survey geologist who contributed to geologic mapping of the Earth's Moon and to the geologic training of the Apollo astronauts.

== Life and career ==
Wilhelms was born July 5, 1930. He was a United States Geological Survey geologist who contributed to geologic mapping of the Earth's Moon and to the geologic training of the Apollo astronauts. He has also contributed to the study of Mars (including Mariner 9), Mercury, and Ganymede.

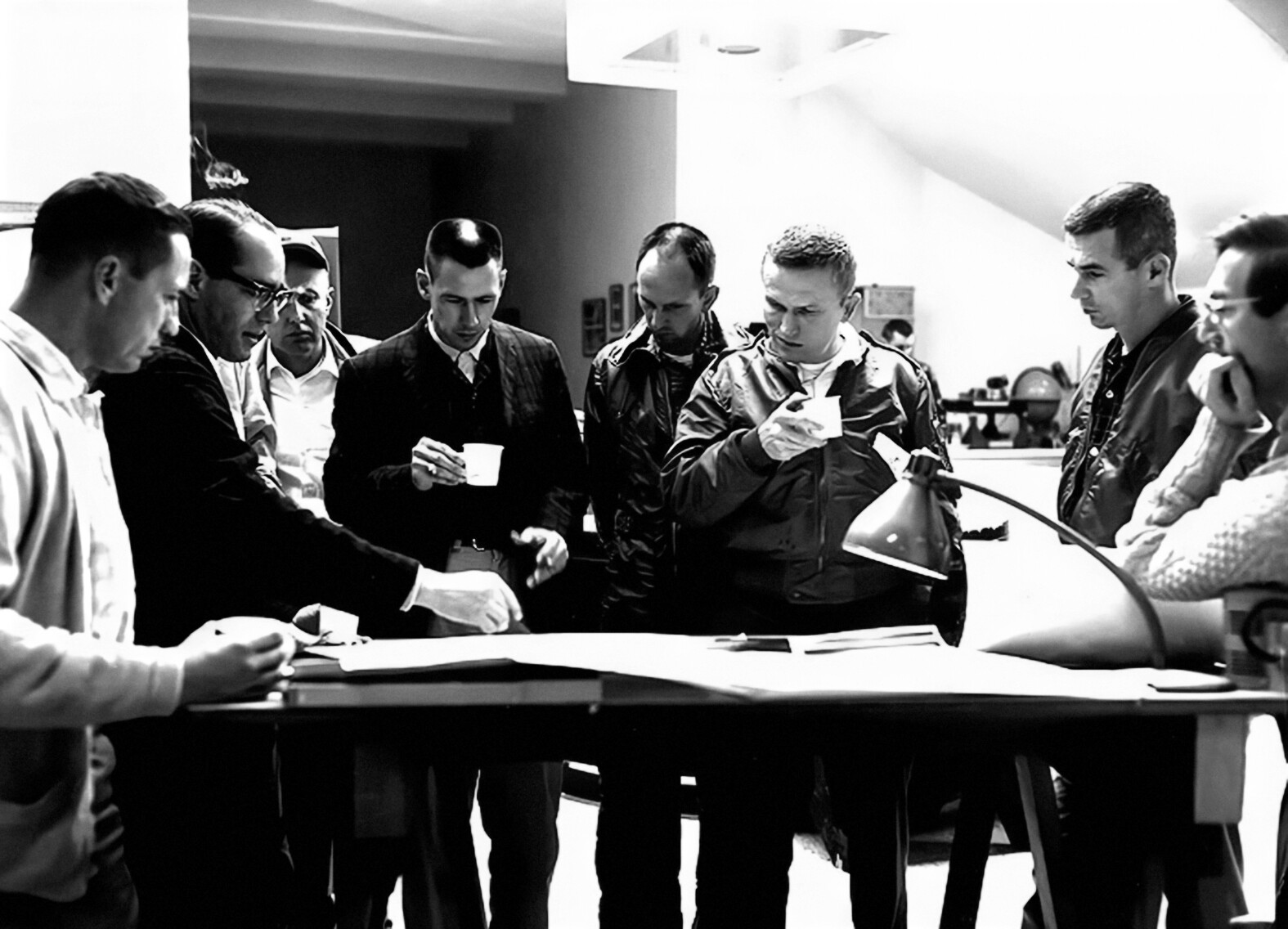
Wilhelms (second from left) briefing astronauts in 1964.

He was the author of To a Rocky Moon: A Geologist's History of Lunar Exploration (1993), The geologic history of the Moon (1987), and he co-authored the Geologic Map of the Near Side of the Moon (1971) with John F. McCauley. Wilhelms also contributed to Apollo Over the Moon: A View from Orbit (NASA SP-362).

Wilhelms was the recipient of the G. K. Gilbert Award in 1988. He received the Shoemaker Distinguished Lunar Scientist Award in 2010 at the Ames Research Center.

The mineral Donwilhelmsite (CaAl_{4}Si_{2}O_{11}) is named after Wilhelms. The fact that this mineral is formed only at high shock pressure such as that created by impacts is appropriate given the focus of Wilhelms' studies.

Minor planet 4826 Wilhelms is named in his honor.

Wilhelms died at the Stanford Hospital in Palo Alto, California, on September 4, 2026, at the age of 96.
