= Ames Stereo Pipeline =

Open-source photogrammetry software

The NASA Ames Stereo Pipeline (ASP) is an open-source software package for photogrammetry. It can create digital elevation models and ortho images from stereo planetary data acquired with NASA spacecraft, including for the Moon, Mars, and all other bodies with a solid surface, and also from commercial Earth-orbiting satellites, such as Digital Globe and any vendors who support the RPC camera model, e.g., Pléiades and Cartosat. For stereo correlation ASP uses block-matching and semi-global matching. ASP also provides tools for correcting the input camera poses using bundle adjustment, registration of obtained terrain models using iterative closest point, and a tool for refining a 3D terrain model with shape from shading. ASP integrates the ISIS software for processing planetary data. Binary releases are available for Linux and OSX.

== History ==
The origins of ASP trace back to stereo surface-reconstruction software developed at NASA Ames for the Mars Pathfinder mission in 1997. A version adapted for satellite imagery, ASP v1, was released as open-source software in October 2009 under a NASA open source license. ASP v2, released in June 2012, added support for commercial satellites such as DigitalGlobe and switched to the Apache 2.0 license.

ASP was originally developed by the NASA Ames Intelligent Robotics Group (IRG), building on more than a decade of the group's experience with surface-reconstruction tools for terrestrial robotic field tests and planetary exploration. The source code is maintained in a public repository on GitHub.

== Applications ==
ASP has been used to generate digital elevation models for a range of Earth and planetary science applications. Researchers at the University of Washington have used ASP to produce time series of DEMs tracking ice-sheet dynamics and outlet-glacier thinning in Greenland and Antarctica from commercial WorldView satellite stereo imagery.

Researchers have also used ASP to generate digital elevation models of Mars from HiRISE stereo image pairs, addressing the limited availability of high-resolution topographic data for the study of Martian surface landforms.

Beyond NASA-affiliated research, ASP has also been used by third-party open-source tools, such as Planet4Stereo, which applies ASP to low-cost PlanetScope satellite imagery for monitoring glacier volume change.

== See also ==
- Comparison of photogrammetry software
- Integrated Software for Imagers and Spectrometers
