= Apollo program training =

Training astronauts for lunar missions

Apollo program training prepared NASA astronauts for crewed spaceflight and lunar surface operations during the Apollo program (1961–1972). The program encompassed geology fieldwork, spacecraft and landing simulation, survival training for contingency landings, water egress drills, and rehearsal of extravehicular activity (EVA) procedures. As Apollo missions grew in scope—from the brief surface stay of Apollo 11 to the extended traverses of Apollo 17—training methods evolved to match increasingly ambitious scientific objectives.

== Geology ==
Because the primary scientific activity on the lunar surface was geological—collecting samples, describing terrain, and photographing formations—astronauts with test-pilot backgrounds required extensive instruction in a discipline most had never studied. Geology training was the largest and longest-running component of the Apollo training program.

=== Early classroom and field instruction ===
Geological instruction began in January 1963, when Eugene Shoemaker of the United States Geological Survey (USGS) led the first two astronaut groups on a two-day trip to Meteor Crater and volcanic features near Flagstaff, Arizona. A formal curriculum followed in 1964, designed jointly by the USGS and NASA's Manned Spacecraft Center (MSC) in Houston. It combined classroom lectures on geological principles, mineralogy, and petrology with field exercises. A total of 29 astronauts participated in the first series, which ran from February through June 1964. Subsequent groups continued through 1967, with later cohorts receiving a condensed version of the syllabus.

Organizational friction between USGS personnel and MSC scientists complicated the program's early years. Both groups had independently begun planning astronaut geology courses before learning of each other's efforts. After the USGS contingent withdrew from Houston to Flagstaff in mid-1964, the two organizations divided responsibilities: USGS handled general geology lectures, MSC covered mineralogy and petrology, and both cooperated on field trips.

=== Field training sites ===
Astronauts trained at geologically diverse locations chosen as lunar analogs. Sites included the Grand Canyon, Meteor Crater, volcanic fields in Hawaii, the Nevada National Security Site (where nuclear-blast craters resembled impact features), the Orocopia and Chocolate Mountains of the Sonoran Desert, and formations in New Mexico, Oregon, Alaska, west Texas, and Sudbury, Ontario.

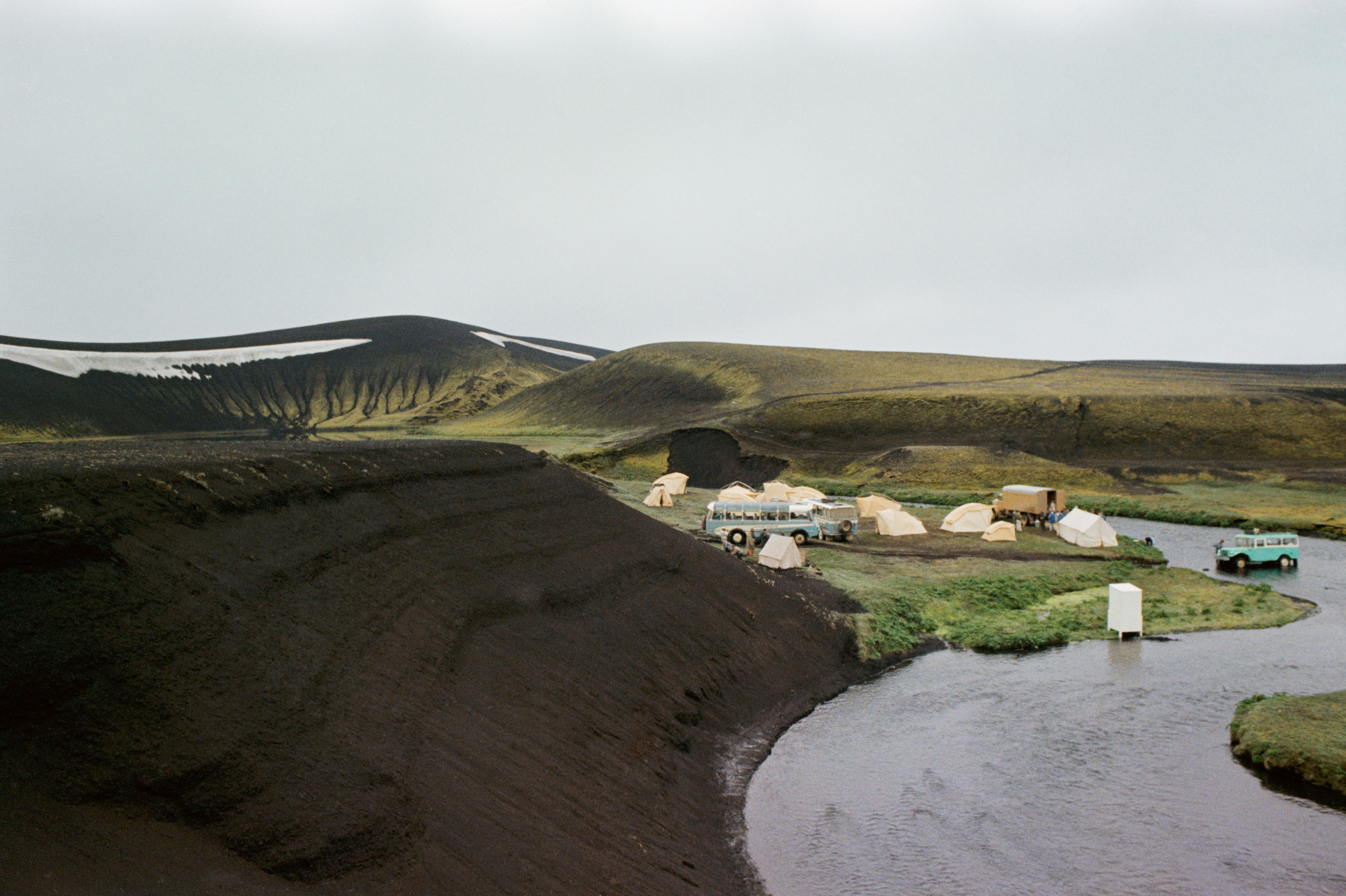
Training camp in Iceland

Iceland served as one of the most valued analog sites. Two field expeditions—in July 1965 and July 1967—brought groups of astronauts to the volcanic highlands around Lake Mývatn and the Askja caldera. The barren basaltic terrain, with minimal vegetation cover, closely approximated conditions expected on the Moon. Nine of the twelve astronauts who walked on the Moon participated in one of the two Iceland trips. Harrison Schmitt, the only geologist to reach the lunar surface, later credited the Iceland exercises with improving crews' ability to interpret the complex rock assemblages of the regolith.

=== Simulated lunar surfaces ===
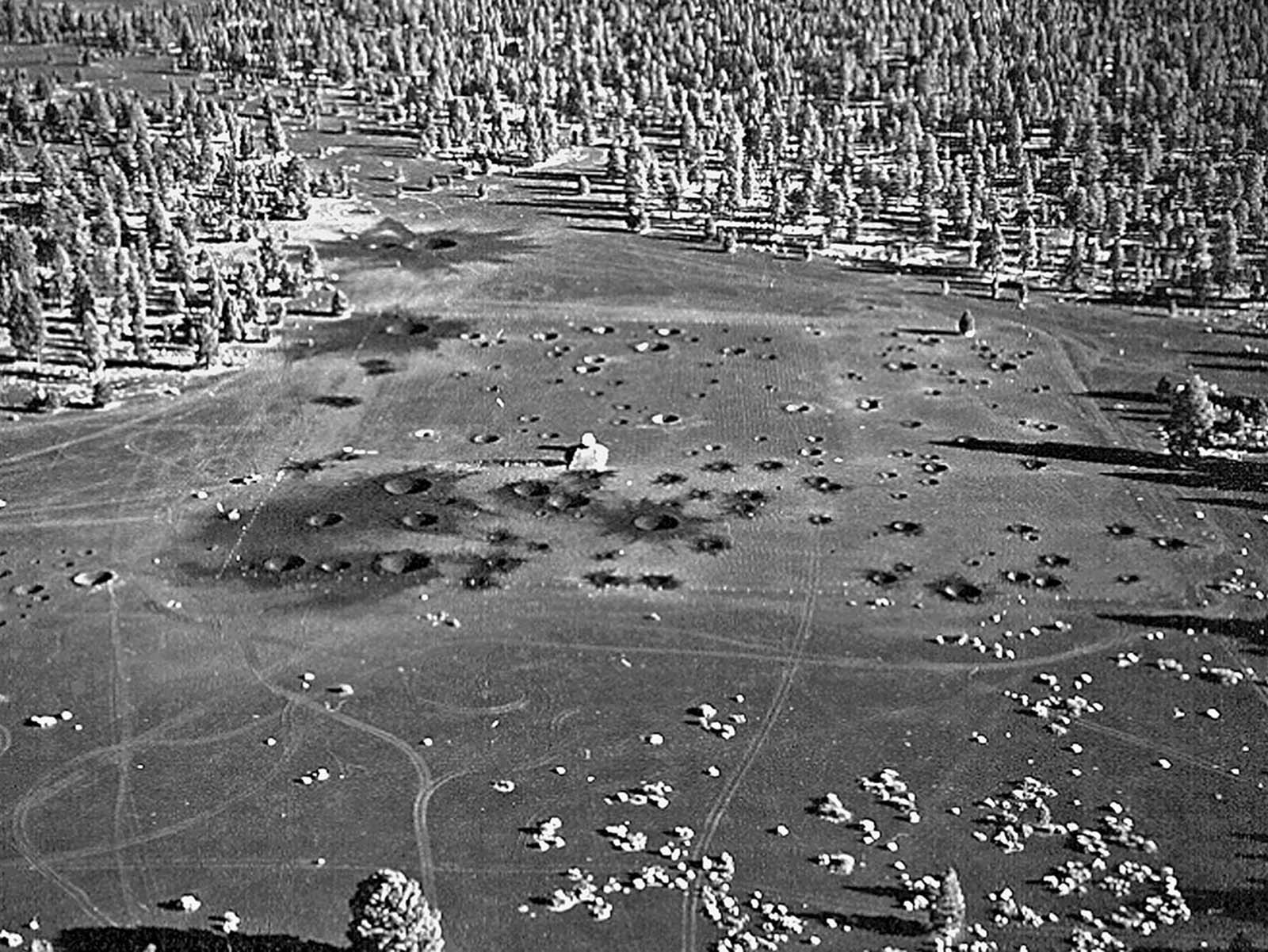
Cinder Lake Crater Field #1, photographed after an additional 96 craters were added in October 1967

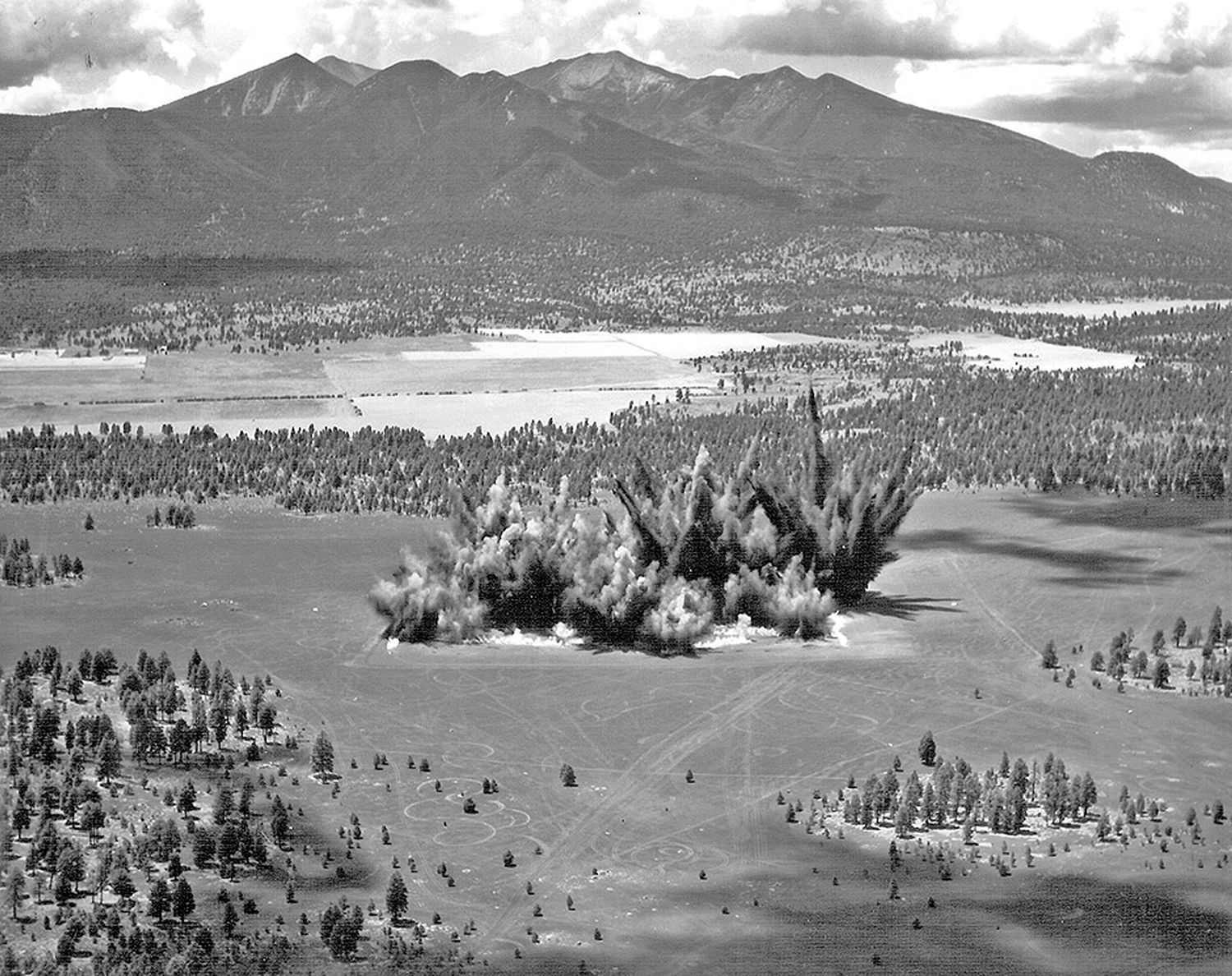
Creation of Cinder Lake Crater Field #2

To replicate the topography of planned landing sites, the USGS and NASA constructed artificial crater fields, named the Cinder Lake Crater Fields, in a joint Astrogeology Research Program. Between July and October 1967, explosives were used to blast 47 craters into the basaltic cinders of the Cinder Lake area northeast of Flagstaff, reproducing a portion of Mare Tranquillitatis at 1:1 scale. A second, larger field followed in 1968:

To begin recreating the lunar craters, engineers dug into the basaltic sediment, revealing distinct layers of cinder and clay indicative of various volcanic episodes. Then, using 1,153 pounds of dynamite and 28,650 pounds of nitro-carbo-nitrate (a blend of agricultural fertilizer and fuel oil), the engineers began laying charges in each of the holes. A total of 354 charges were detonated to create the "oldest" craters, and 61 charges were then detonated to create craters of "intermediate" age. After the intermediate craters were created, scattering their debris over the projectile from the first set of explosions, the 11 remaining charges were detonated to make the "youngest" craters and disperse the final layer of debris.

Sequential detonations simulated overlapping ejecta blankets of different ages, allowing astronauts to practice describing crater morphology and relative age. A third field was produced in February 1970 at Black Mesa in the Verde Valley, using 850 tons of TNT and 43 tons of ammonium nitrate to create 380 craters. The Cinder Lake crater fields were created before Apollo 11, but the astronauts of Apollo 15 were first who trained on them; the Apollo 17 crew were the last to train there in 1972.

At MSC, an outdoor "rock pile" provided a smaller simulated surface. The original 63-foot-diameter facility, installed in 1964–1965, was replaced by 1968 with a two-acre field containing 188 craters. Kennedy Space Center maintained a comparable "sand pile" for tool and instrument practice, though its near-sea-level elevation sometimes caused craters to flood.

=== Mission-specific training ===
As landing-site selection matured after Apollo 12 demonstrated precision landing capability, field exercises became tailored to specific missions. Traverse planning for the later missions (Apollo 15, 16, and 17) was an iterative process involving geology teams, flight controllers, principal investigators, and crew members. Planned traverses were refined repeatedly and entered onto wrist-mounted cuff checklists for use on the surface. Crews practiced with the Lunar Roving Vehicle (LRV) using a terrestrial test model nicknamed "Grover" (Geologic Rover) at the Cinder Lake fields and other Arizona sites.

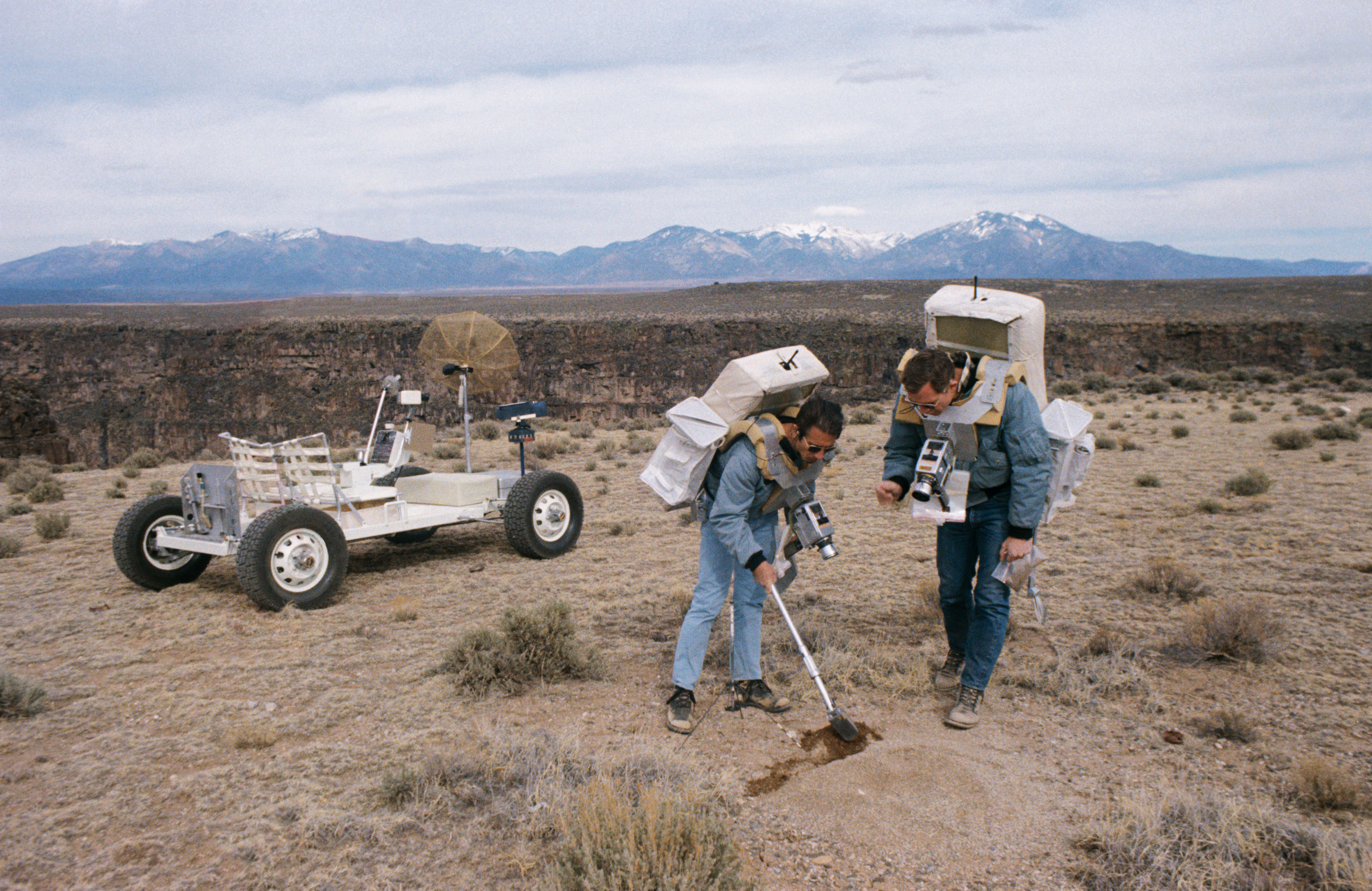
Apollo 15 LRV Irwin Scott geology training in New Mexico

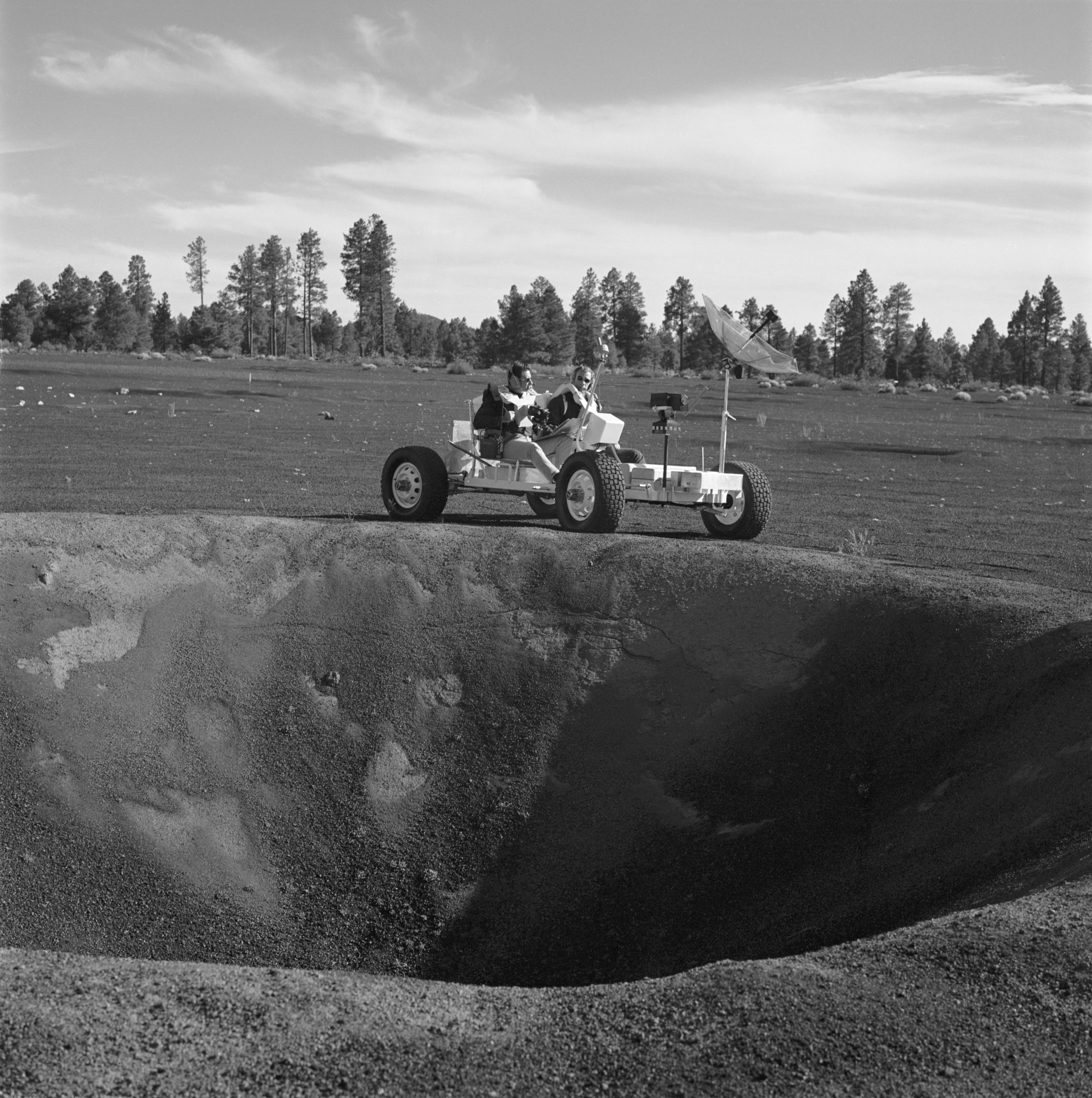
Apollo 15 crewmen riding lunar roving vehicle simulator at Cinder Lake crater field

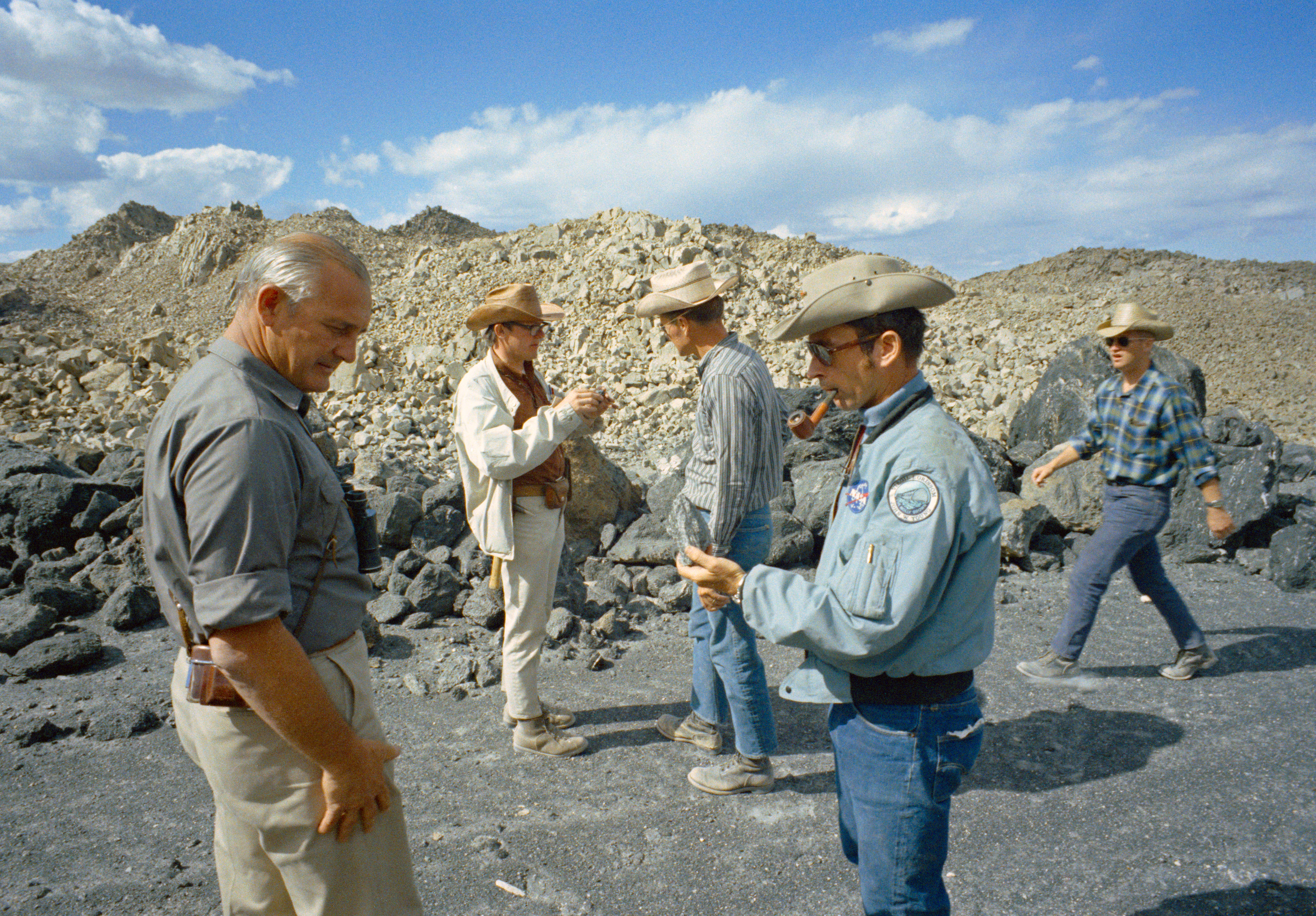
Apollo 16 astronauts geology training

== Simulators and flight training ==
=== Lunar landing ===
The Lunar Landing Research Vehicle (LLRV), built by Bell Aerosystems, was a free-flying vehicle that used a gimbaled turbofan engine to cancel five-sixths of its weight, simulating one-sixth-g conditions. Hydrogen peroxide thrusters provided attitude control and supplemental lift, giving the pilot six degrees of freedom comparable to those of the Lunar Module (LM). Two LLRVs were built and tested at what is now NASA's Flight Research Center at Edwards Air Force Base. On 6 May 1968, Neil Armstrong ejected from LLRV-1 seconds before it crashed after its attitude-control fuel was depleted; he was uninjured.

Three improved Lunar Landing Training Vehicles (LLTVs) were delivered to Ellington Field near Houston beginning in late 1967. Only mission commanders and their backups flew the LLTV, owing to limited vehicle availability, cost, and safety concerns. Two of the three LLTVs were destroyed in crashes (December 1968 and January 1971); both pilots ejected safely. Gene Cernan's flight on 13 November 1972—three weeks before Apollo 17's launch—was the LLTV's final mission. Armstrong later stated that the LM "flew very much like the Lunar Landing Training Vehicle" and credited the LLTV with the confidence he needed for the Apollo 11 landing.

=== Other simulators ===
NASA employed several additional simulation facilities:

- The Lunar Landing Research Facility at Langley Research Center used a gantry-mounted partial-gravity rig to allow full-scale LM descent and touchdown practice.
- The Reduced Gravity Walking Simulator, also at Langley, suspended test subjects sideways against a tilted wall so that their legs bore only one-sixth of their body weight. Twenty-four astronauts used the device; it was also demonstrated on television by Walter Cronkite in 1968.
- The Lunar Orbit and Landing Approach (LOLA) simulator at Langley projected a high-resolution model of the lunar surface beneath a moving camera to train crews in visual landmark recognition during the final descent phase.
- The Lunar Module Mission Simulator (LMMS) at MSC was a high-fidelity interior mockup replicating LM controls and displays, used extensively for powered-descent and ascent procedures.
- The Rendezvous Docking Simulator at Langley trained crews in the orbital mechanics of rendezvous and docking between the Command Module and the LM.
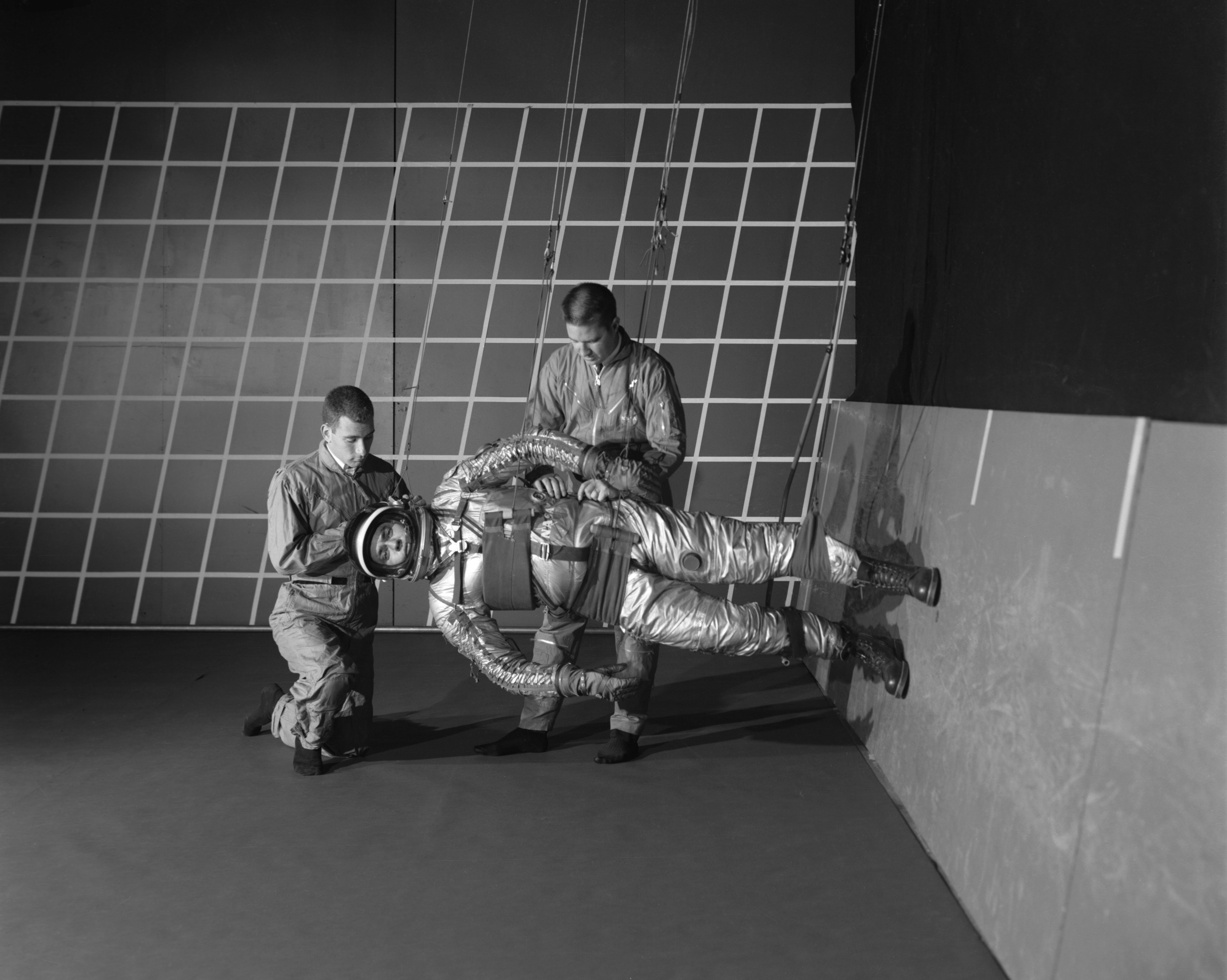
Reduced Gravity Walking Simulator

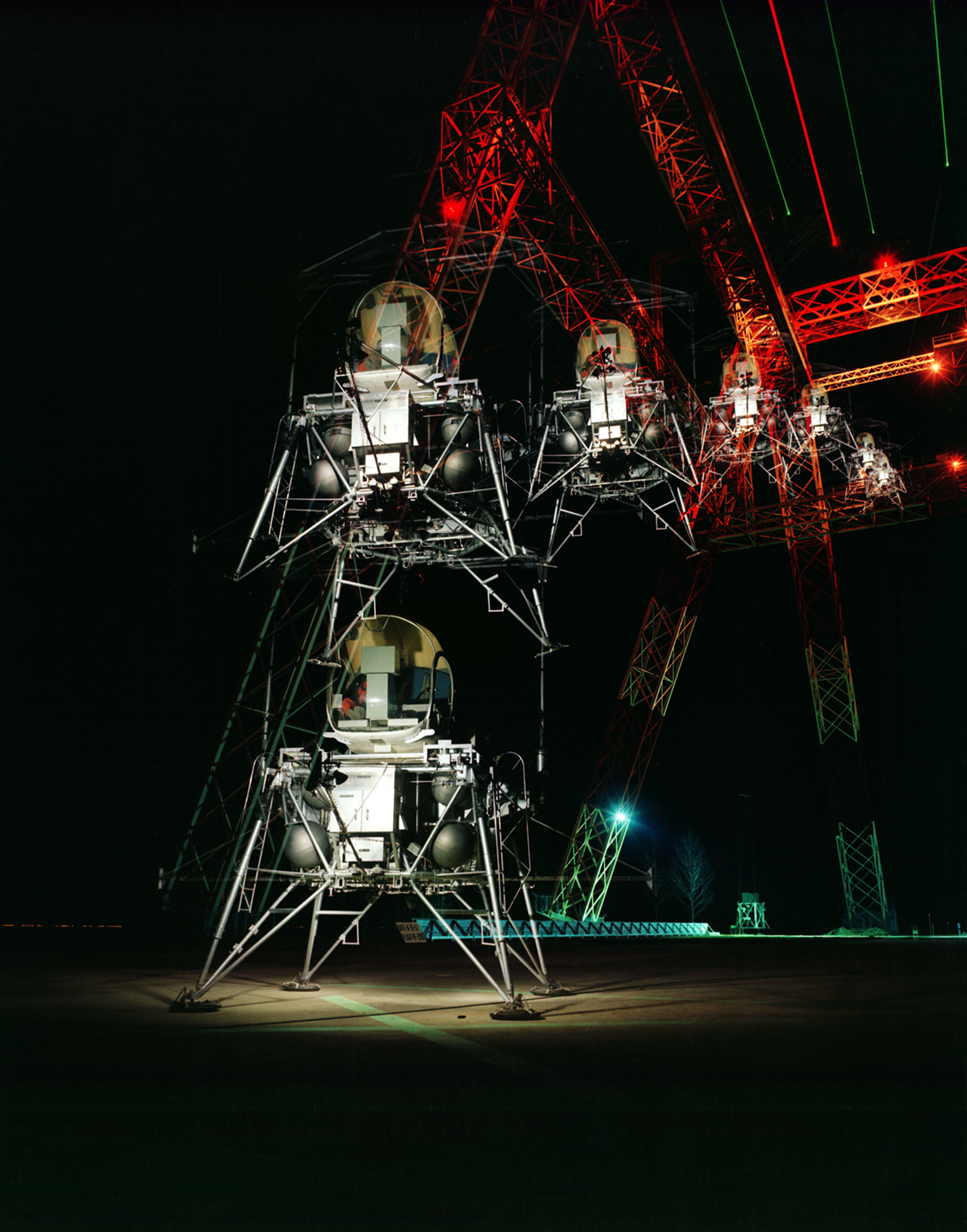
Lunar Excursion Module Simulator (LEMS)

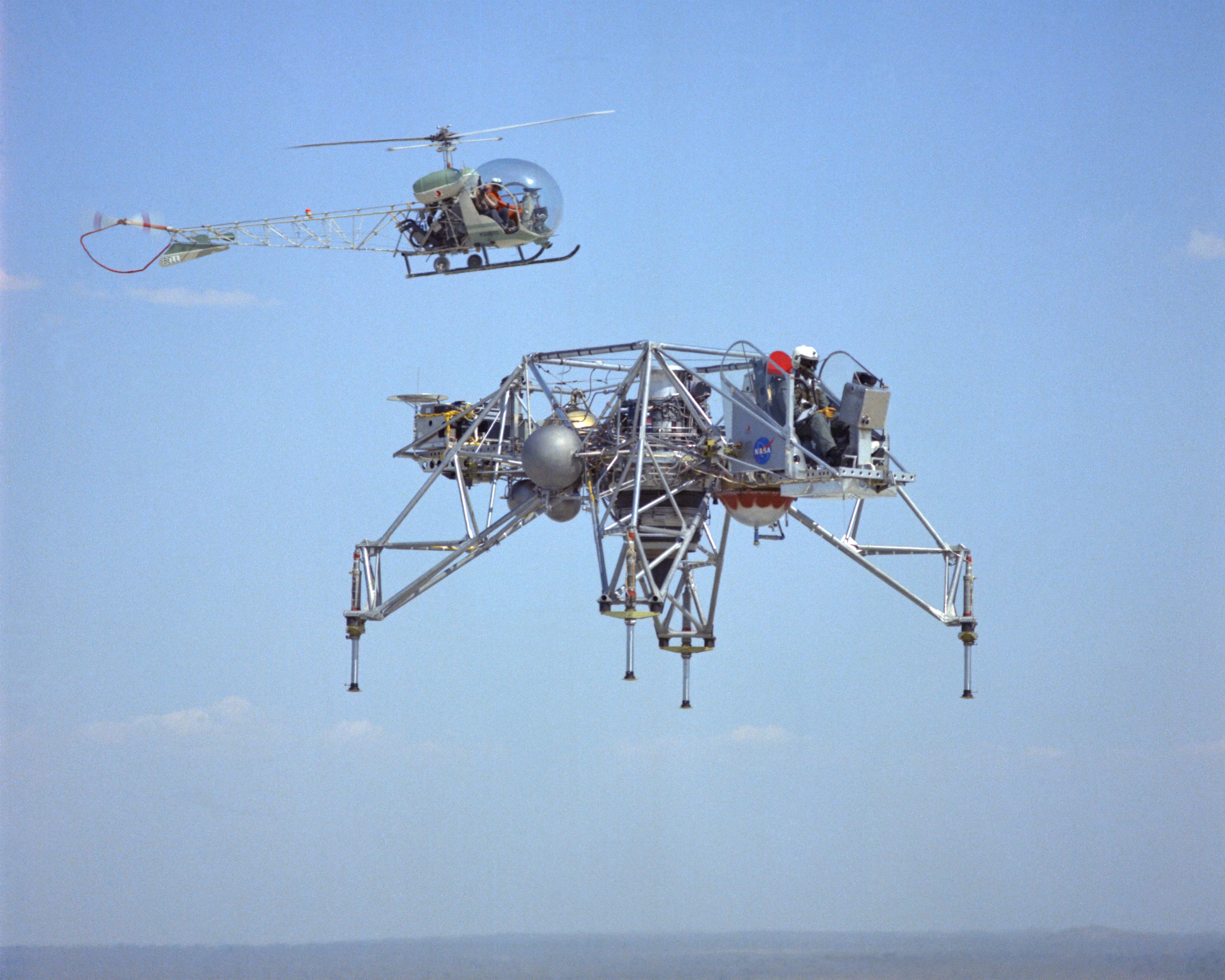
Lunar Landing Research Vehicle

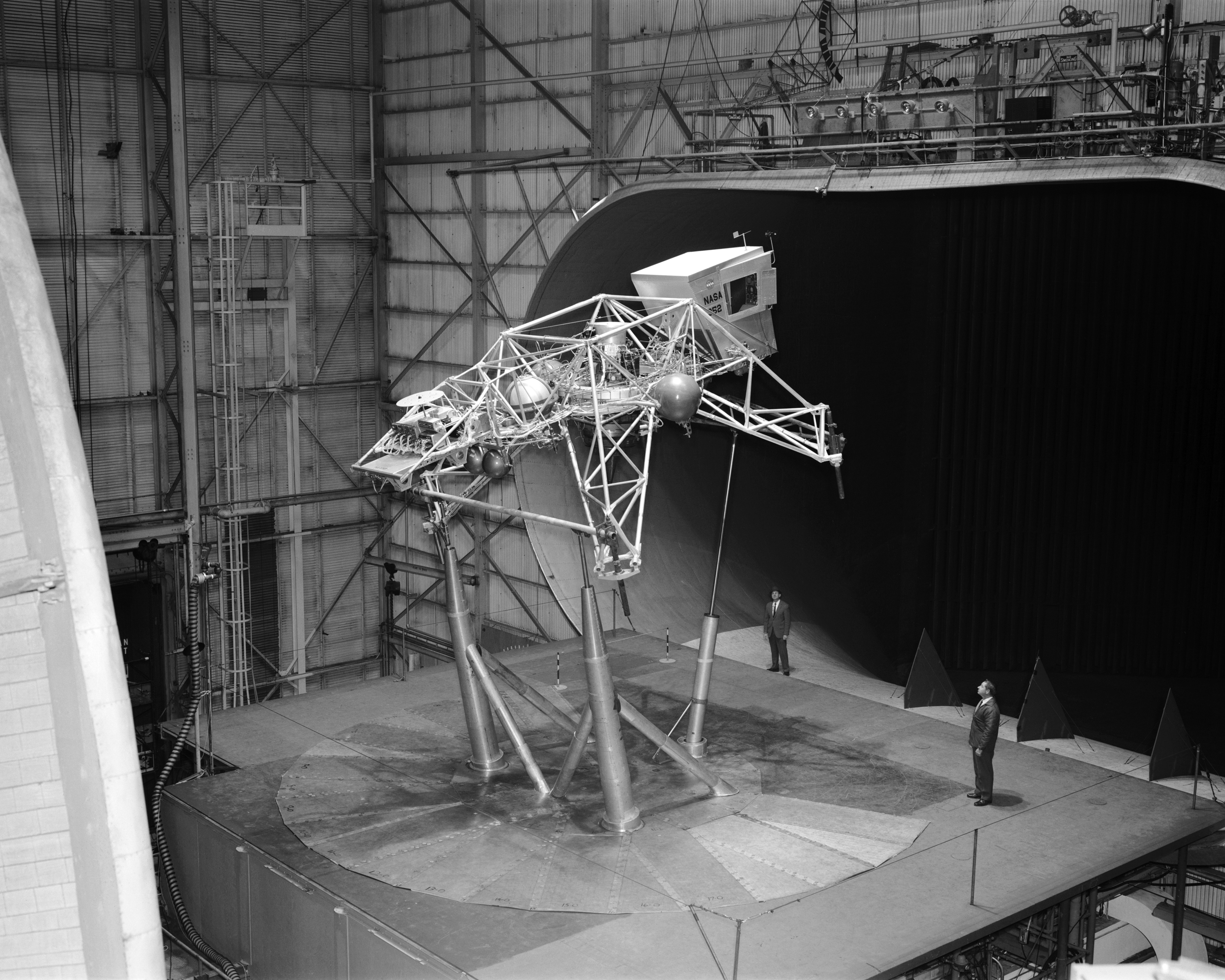
Bell Lunar Landing Training Vehicle (LLTV)

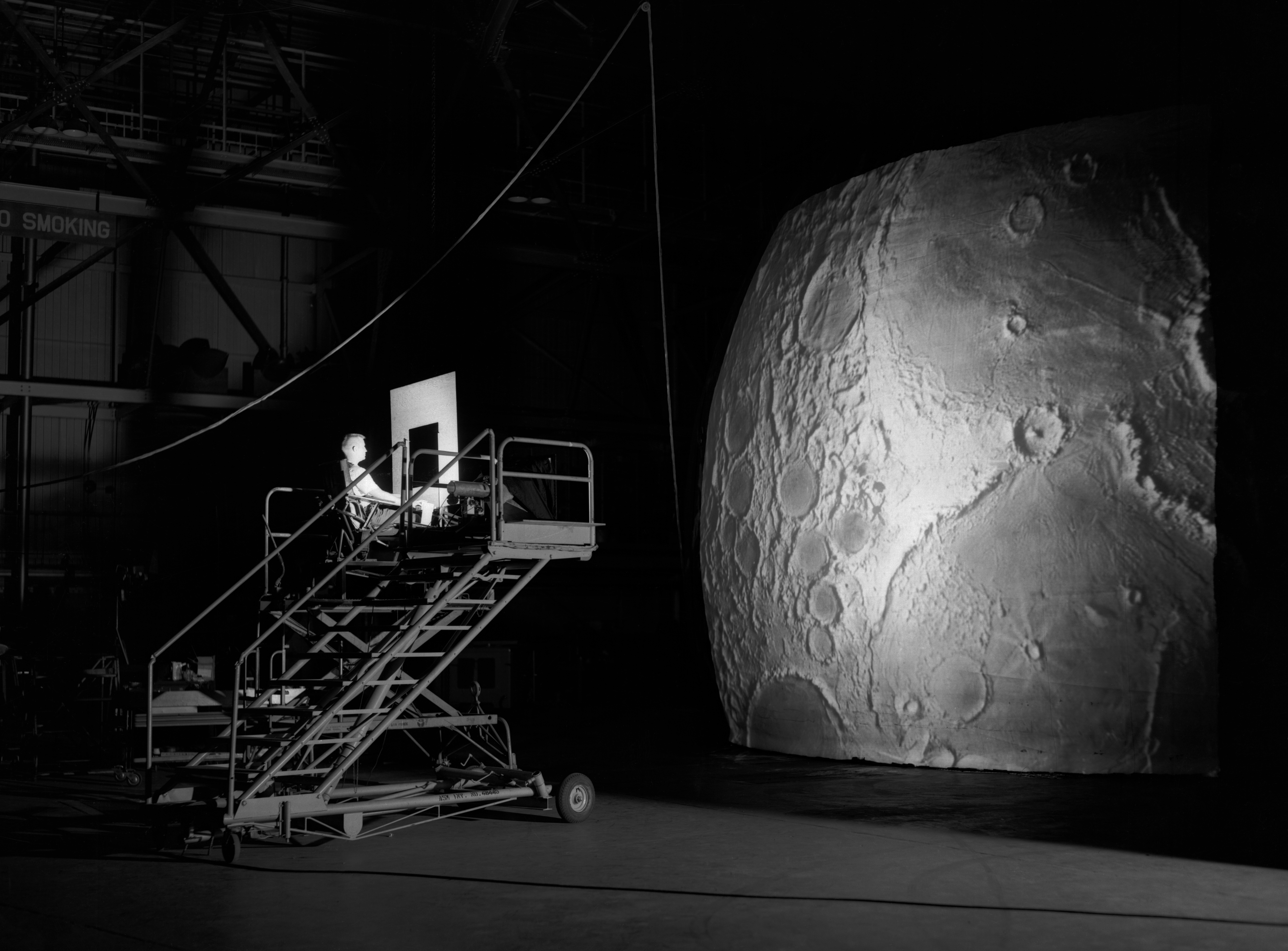
Lunar Orbit and Landing Approach

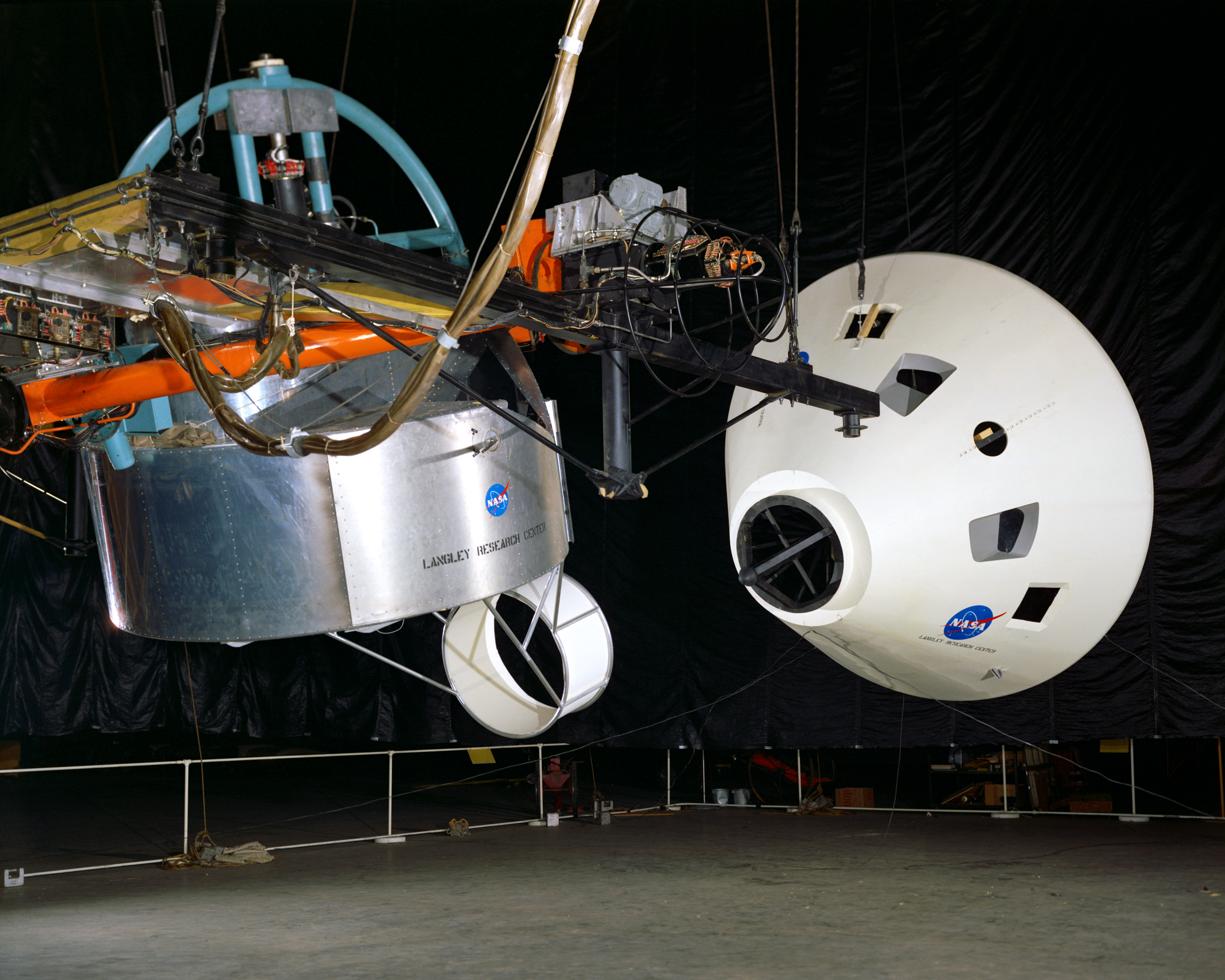
Rendezvous Docking Simulator

== Survival training ==
Survival training prepared crews for the possibility of an off-target or emergency landing in a remote environment. The program was divided into desert, jungle, and water phases, each combining classroom instruction, demonstrations, and multi-day field exercises.

=== Desert ===
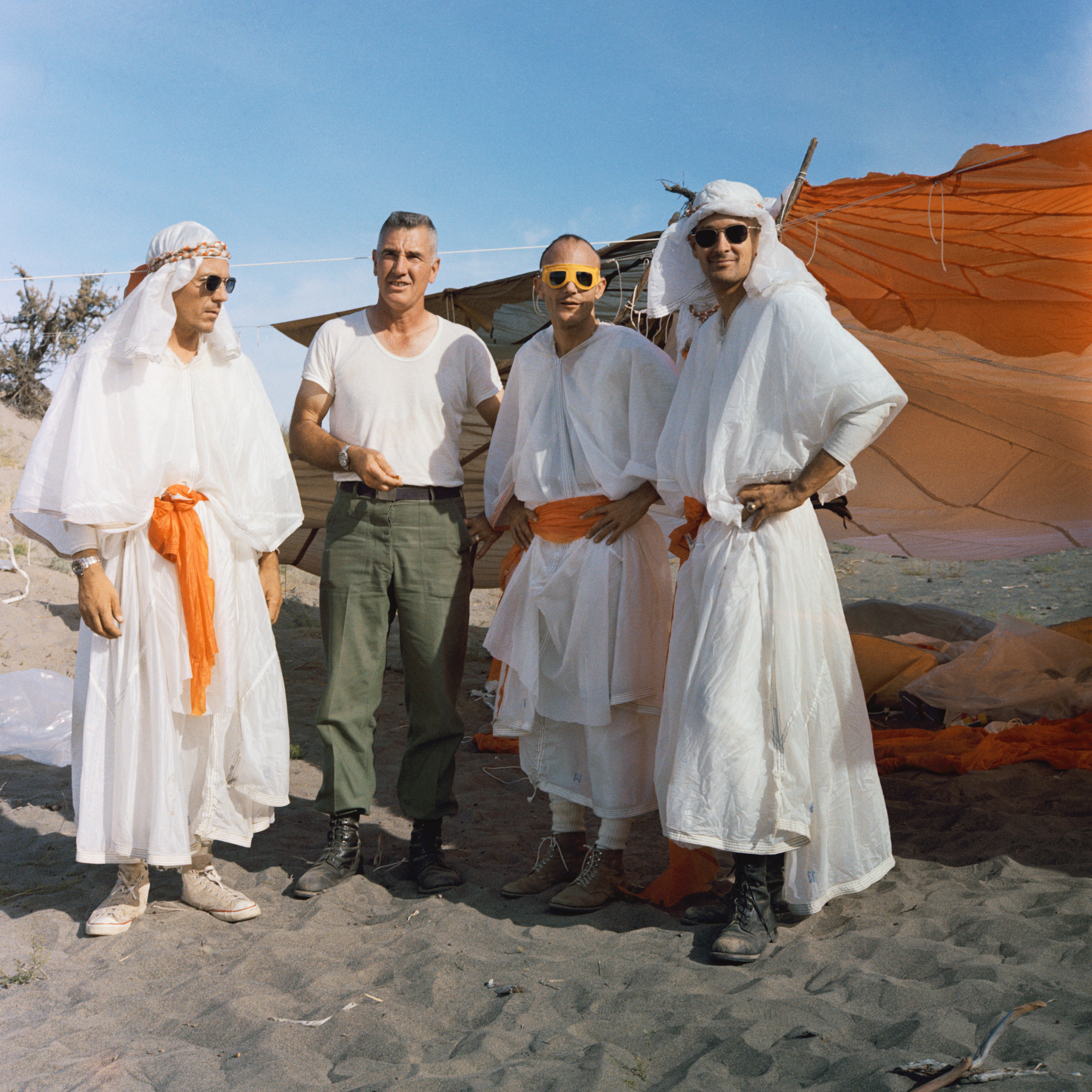
Apollo desert survival training

Desert survival courses began with the Mercury Seven in 1960 at Stead Air Force Base north of Reno, Nevada, where daytime temperatures exceeded 45 °C (113 °F). After classroom instruction, astronauts were flown to the Carson Sink and left in groups for three days. They learned to fashion shelters and loose clothing from parachute material, conserve water, and exploit lower sub-surface temperatures by digging into the ground. In August 1964, fourteen astronauts—including Armstrong, Aldrin, and Collins—completed the final course at Stead before the school relocated to Fairchild Air Force Base in Washington state.

=== Jungle ===
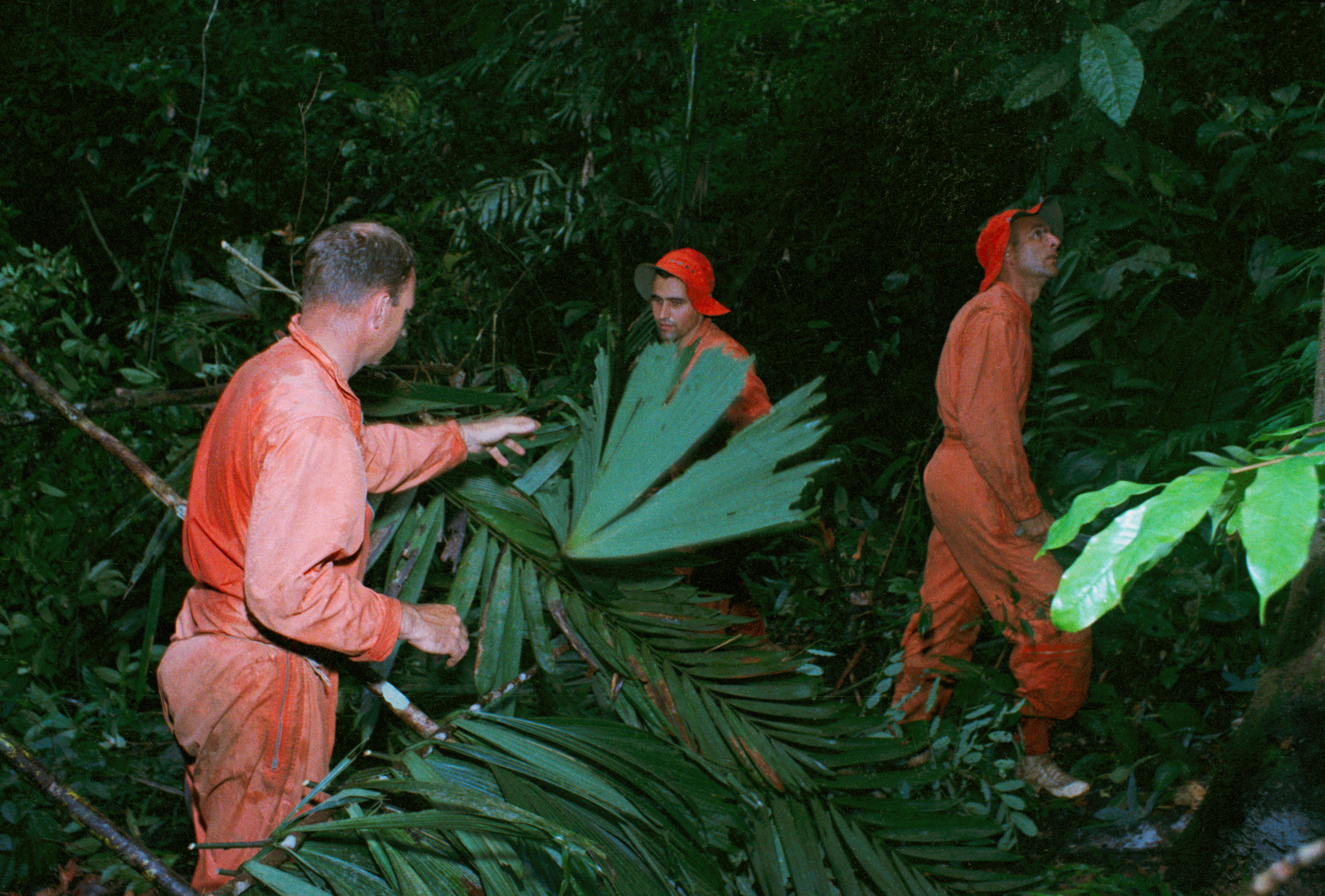
Jungle training in Panama

Jungle survival training took place at the U.S. Air Force Tropic Survival School at Albrook Air Force Base in the Panama Canal Zone. After several days of classroom instruction, astronauts spent two nights and three days in the Panamanian jungle, where they practiced finding and purifying water, foraging for edible plants, and building lean-to shelters. Indigenous Emberá instructors led by Chief Manuel Antonio Zarco taught techniques drawn from centuries of jungle habitation. A June 1963 session was the first to include astronauts from the Mercury, Gemini, and Apollo selections.

== Water egress ==
Because all Apollo spacecraft returned to Earth via ocean splashdown, water egress training was a critical component of mission preparation. Training used boilerplate Command Module BP-1102A, an aluminum mock-up built in-house by MSC's Landing and Recovery Division. Crews first practised egress procedures in a water tank, then progressed to open-water sessions in the Gulf of Mexico aboard the NASA motor vessel Retriever. They rehearsed exiting the spacecraft in both the stable upright ("Apex-up" or Stable I) position and the inverted ("Apex-down" or Stable II) configuration, the latter while fully suited. Egress training totalled approximately 13 hours per astronaut. For Apollo 11 and subsequent missions, procedures also incorporated biological isolation garments (BIGs) and decontamination protocols to guard against possible lunar back-contamination.

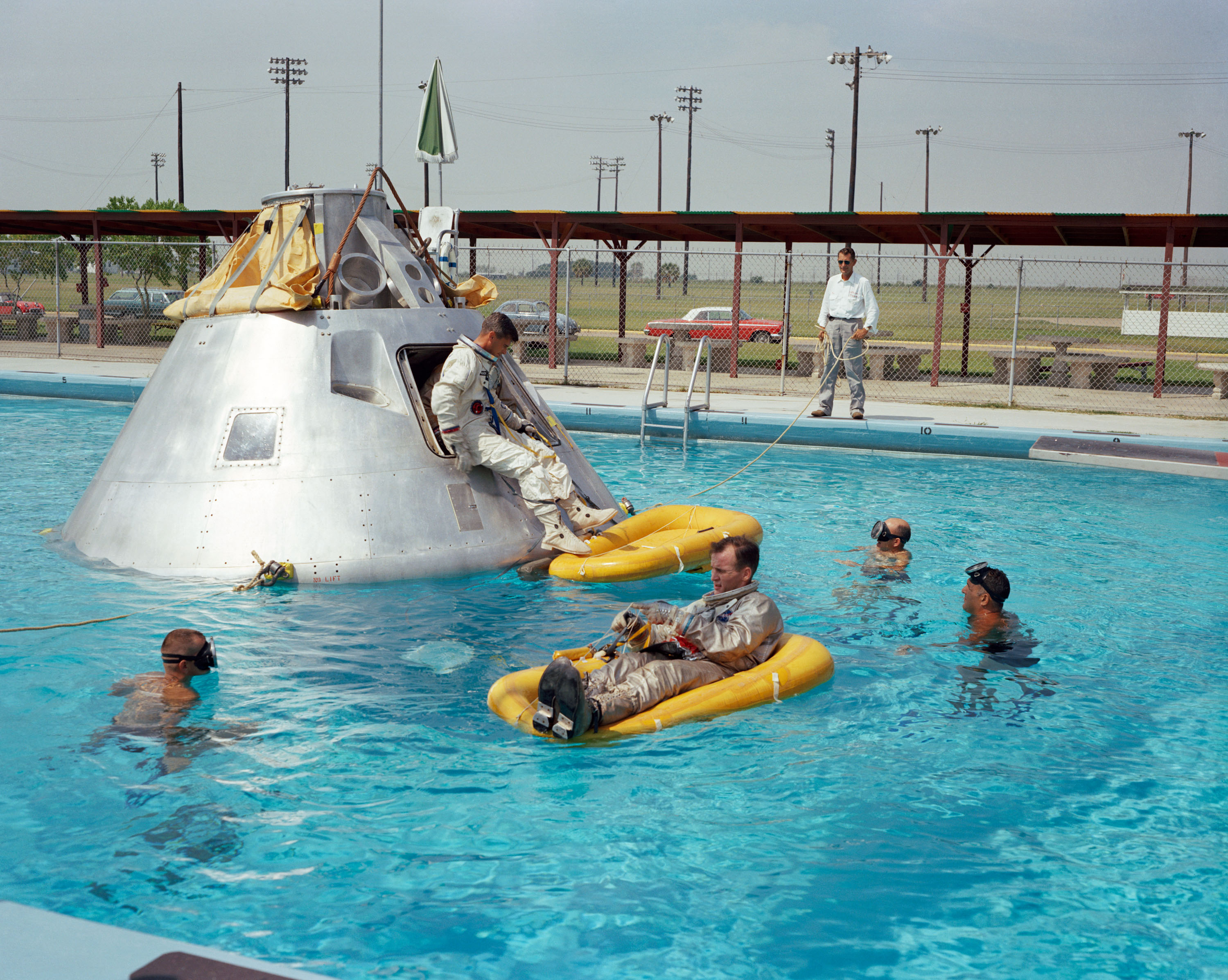
Apex-up: Apollo 1 astronauts Edward H. White II and Roger B. Chaffee during water egress training

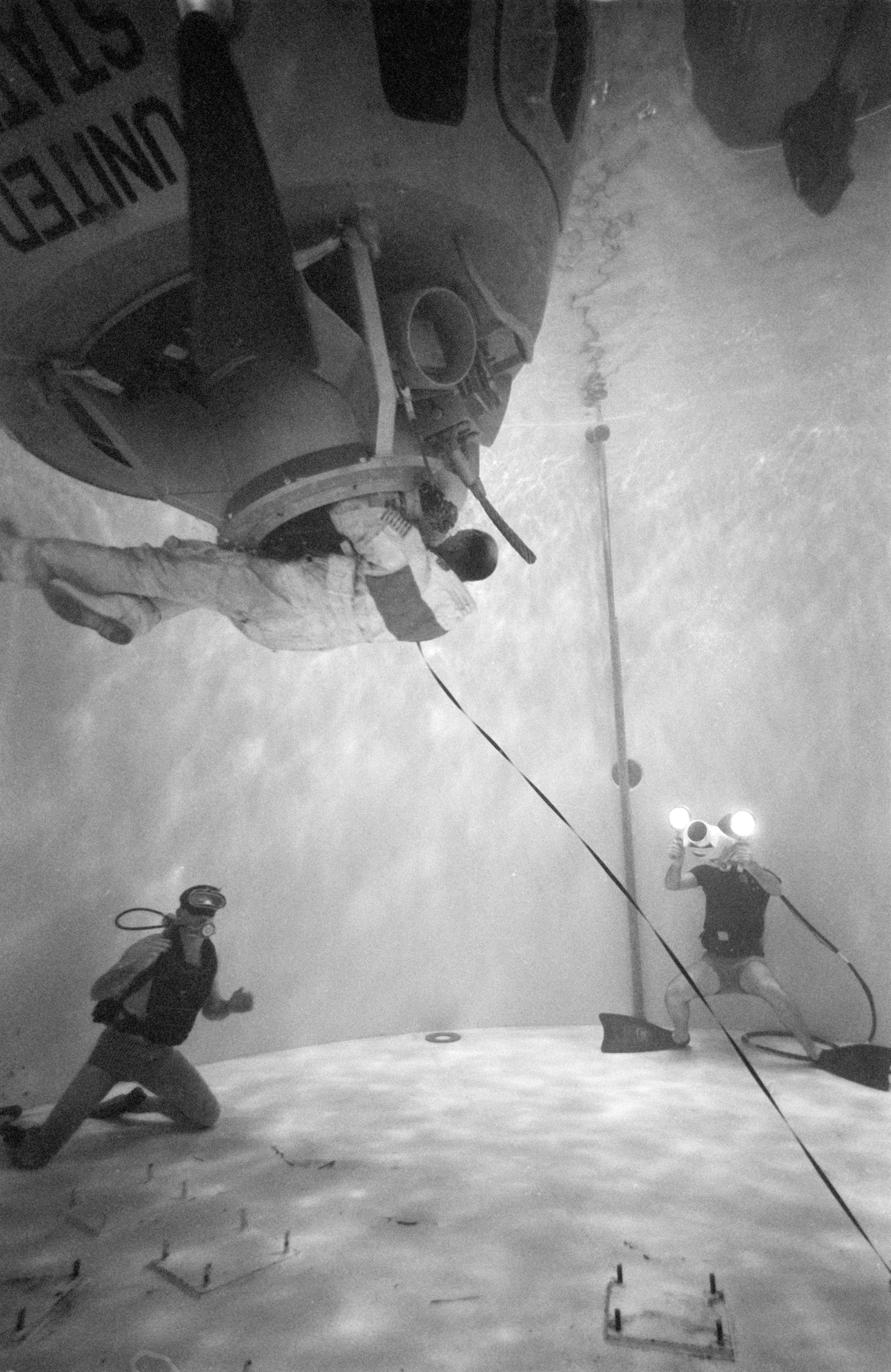
Apex-down: Apollo 13 astronaut Thomas Mattingly during water egress training

== Extravehicular activity ==
Extravehicular activity (EVA) training prepared astronauts for surface operations including sample collection, instrument deployment, photography, and verbal descriptions of geological features. Crews rehearsed deploying the Apollo Lunar Surface Experiments Package (ALSEP)—a suite of geophysical instruments powered by a radioisotope thermoelectric generator—at simulated lunar surfaces at MSC, KSC, and the Cinder Lake fields. The later missions (Apollo 15–17) added LRV driving practice and more complex traverses with multiple geology stations.

=== Neutral buoyancy ===
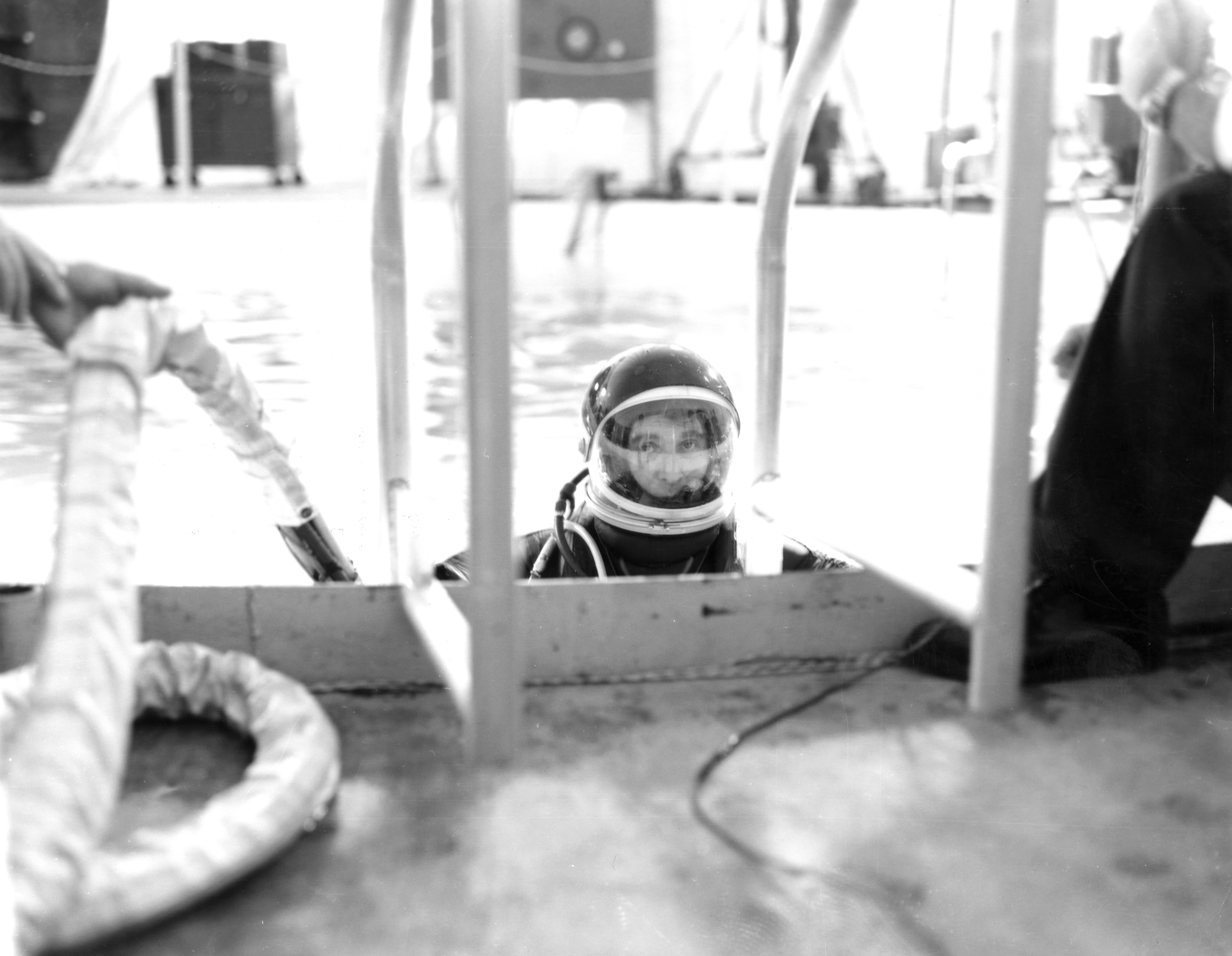
Wernher von Braun on the ladder to the 25-foot diameter Neutral Buoyancy Simulator at Marshall Space Flight Center (1967)

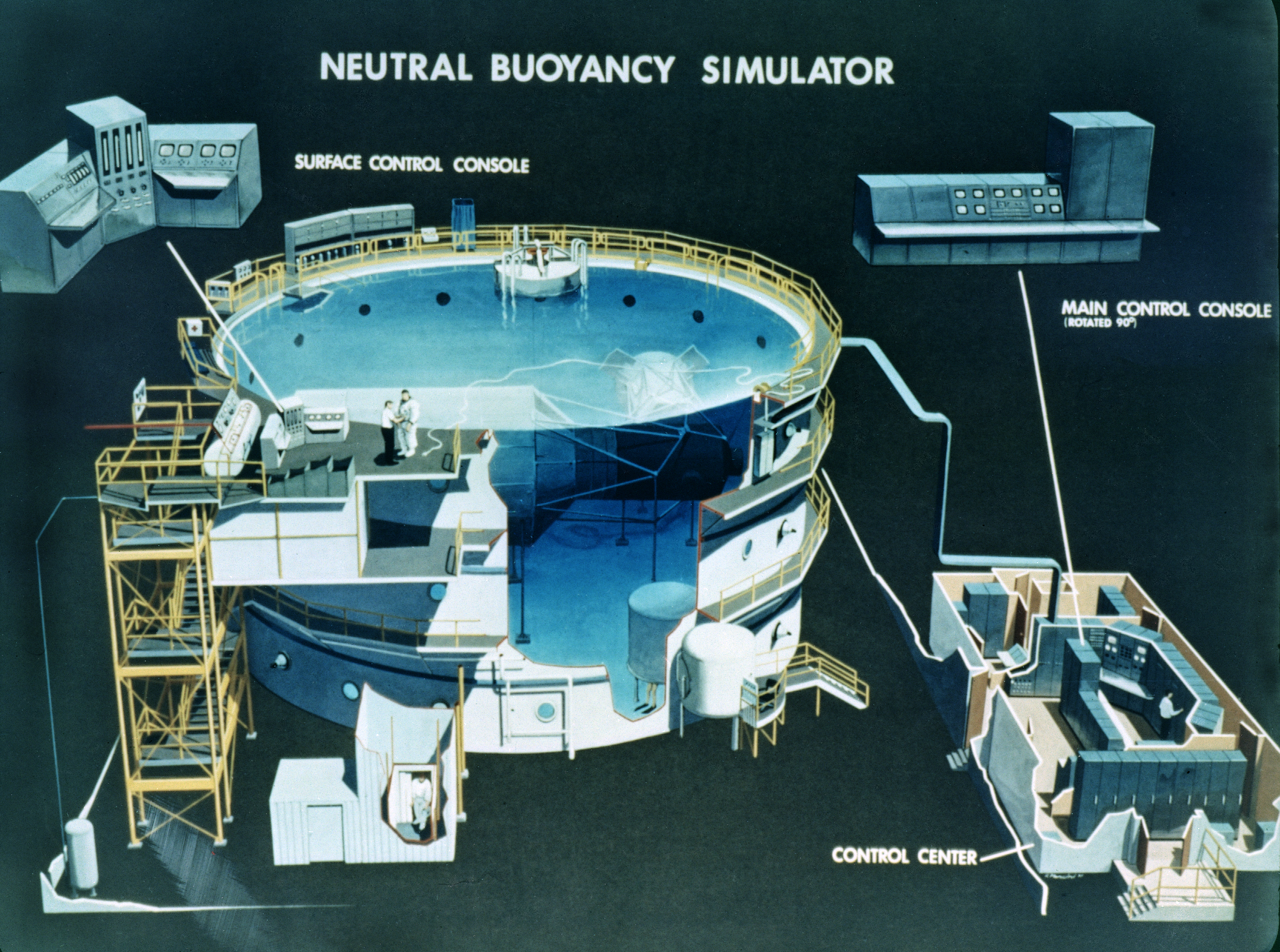
Neutral Buoyancy Simulator cutaway

The use of underwater neutral buoyancy to train for spacewalks was not part of NASA's original plan. Initial EVA preparation relied on parabolic aircraft flights (which produced only about 30 seconds of weightlessness per cycle), air-bearing surfaces, and overhead suspension rigs. The technique's development was driven by the Gemini EVA crisis of 1966, when astronauts on Gemini IX, X, and XI experienced severe overheating, visor fogging, and exhaustion while attempting to perform tasks outside the spacecraft.

The key innovations came from Environmental Research Associates (ERA), a small company near Baltimore founded by Sam Mattingly and Harry Loats. Beginning in 1964 under contract to Langley Research Center, ERA conducted experiments in a rented swimming pool at the McDonogh School in Maryland using borrowed Navy Mark IV pressure suits weighted with lead to achieve neutral buoyancy in all six degrees of freedom. Through trial and error, the ERA team developed the safety protocols, suit-weighting techniques, and procedural methods that constituted what Neufeld and Charles termed a "small technological system." In September 1966, Buzz Aldrin became the first astronaut to use neutral buoyancy for mission-specific training when he rehearsed his Gemini XII spacewalk tasks in the McDonogh pool. He subsequently completed a then-record three EVAs without the difficulties that had plagued earlier missions, and attributed his success largely to the underwater preparation.

In early 1967, MSC installed its own Water Immersion Facility (WIF) in Building 5—a circular above-ground pool 25 feet (7.6 m) in diameter and 16 feet (4.9 m) deep. For Apollo, the WIF served both to rehearse contingency procedures (such as emergency crew transfer between the LM and Command Module) and to simulate one-sixth-gravity surface conditions by adjusting suit weighting. Neil Armstrong's suit was weighted in the WIF in April 1969 to approximate lunar gravity for surface-activity practice. Apollo 17 astronaut Ronald Evans used the WIF to rehearse the deep-space EVA he would perform during the return from the Moon, retrieving film canisters from the Service Module's Scientific Instrument Module bay.

In parallel, Marshall Space Flight Center independently developed neutral buoyancy capability in a repurposed 25 feet (7.6 m)-diameter explosive-forming tank, initially for Orbital Workshop (later Skylab) tasks. Marshall's work began in 1965–1966 with engineer Charles Cooper and colleague Charles Stokes experimenting with pressure suits in a smaller tank.

=== Other EVA training methods ===
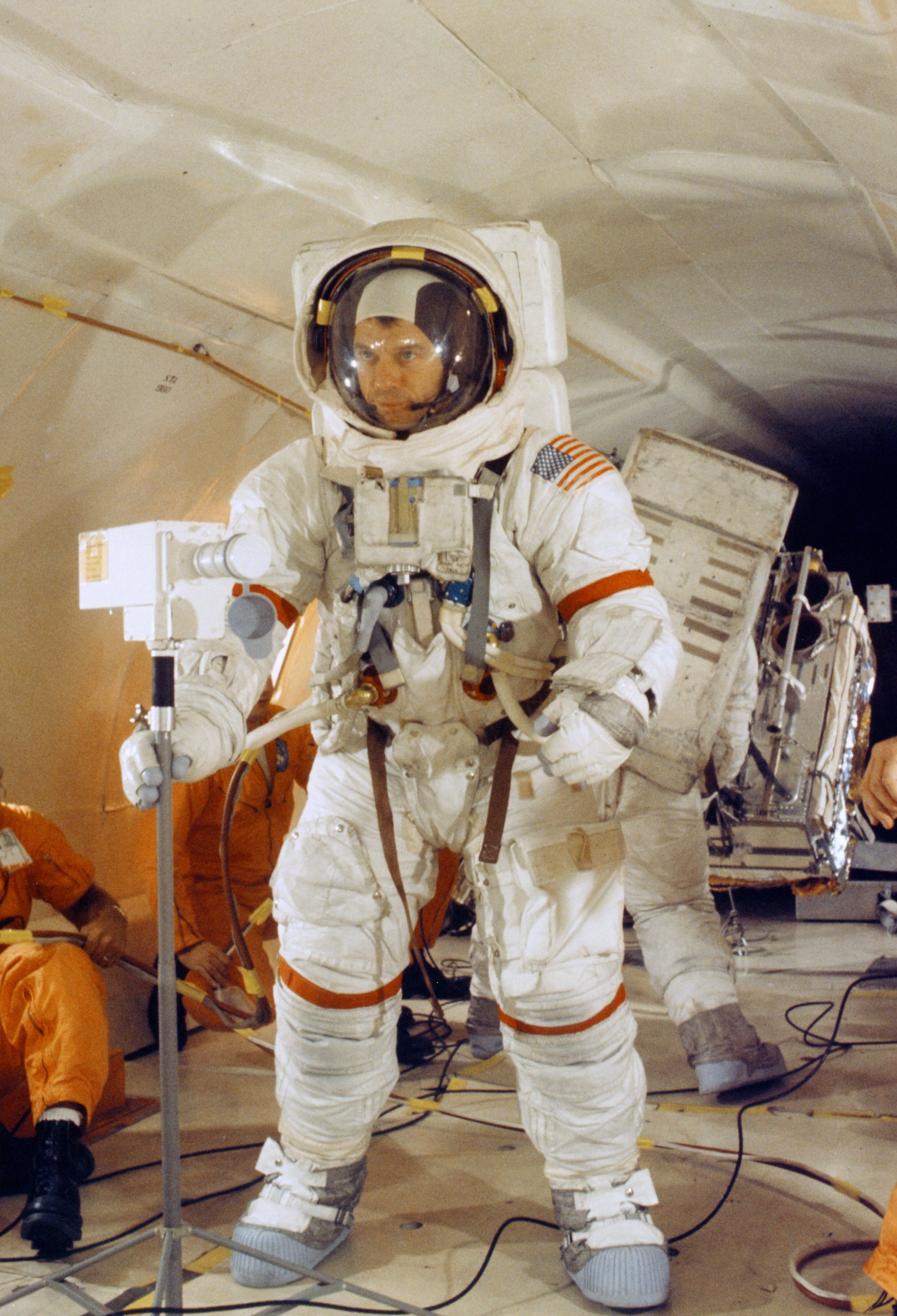
Al Shepard trains with a mock-up of the TV camera while aboard a KC-135 aircraft

A large vacuum chamber at MSC duplicated lighting intensity and temperature under vacuum conditions. Parabolic flights in a modified KC-135 aircraft ("Vomit Comet") remained in use throughout Apollo and were considered the most realistic of the reduced-gravity platforms for evaluating tools and procedures, though each period of reduced gravity lasted only about 30 seconds. Full-dress rehearsals in the final months before each mission integrated the science timeline with Mission Control simulations, coordinating the astronauts, flight controllers, and principal investigators who would staff the science support rooms during the actual missions.

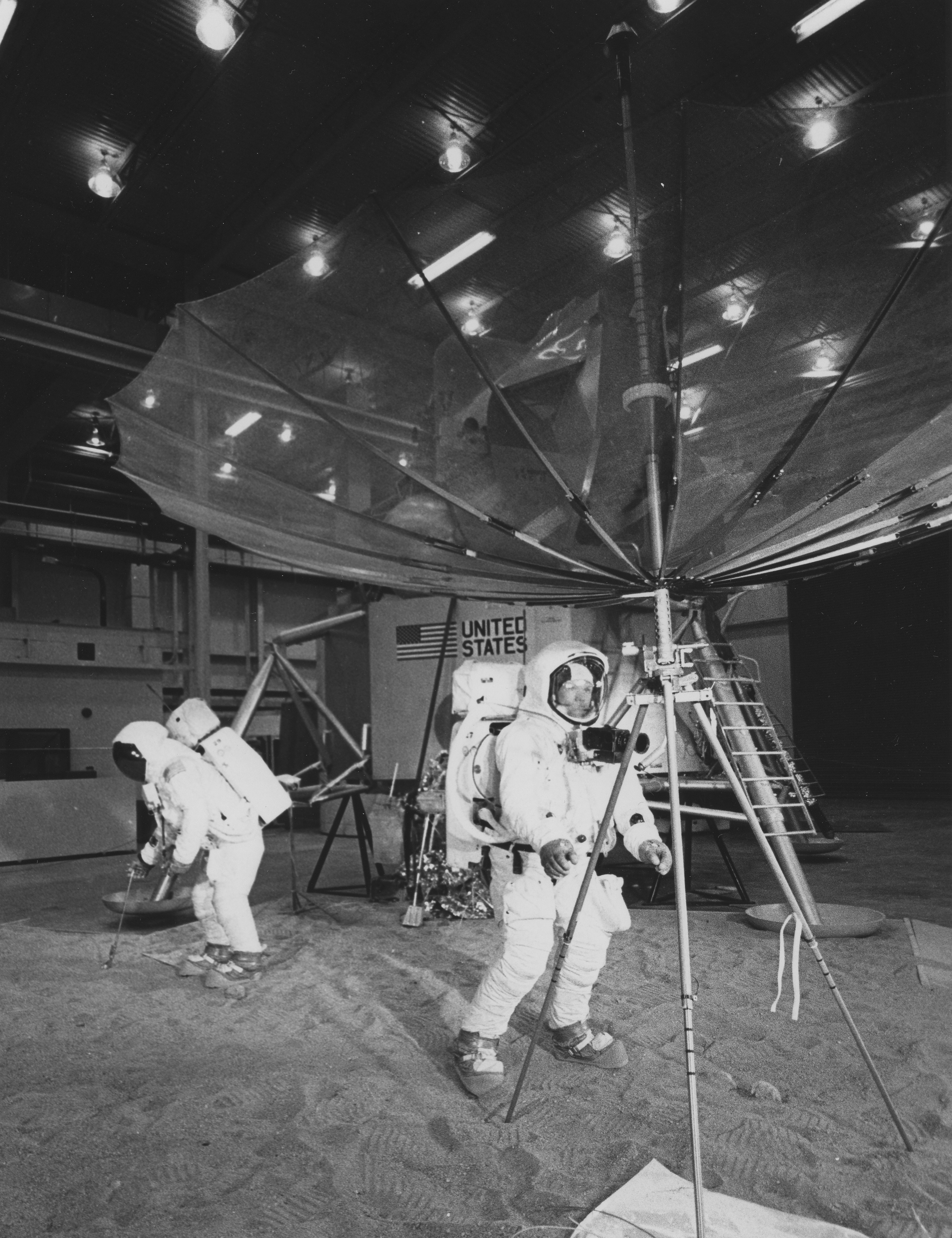
Apollo 11 EVA training

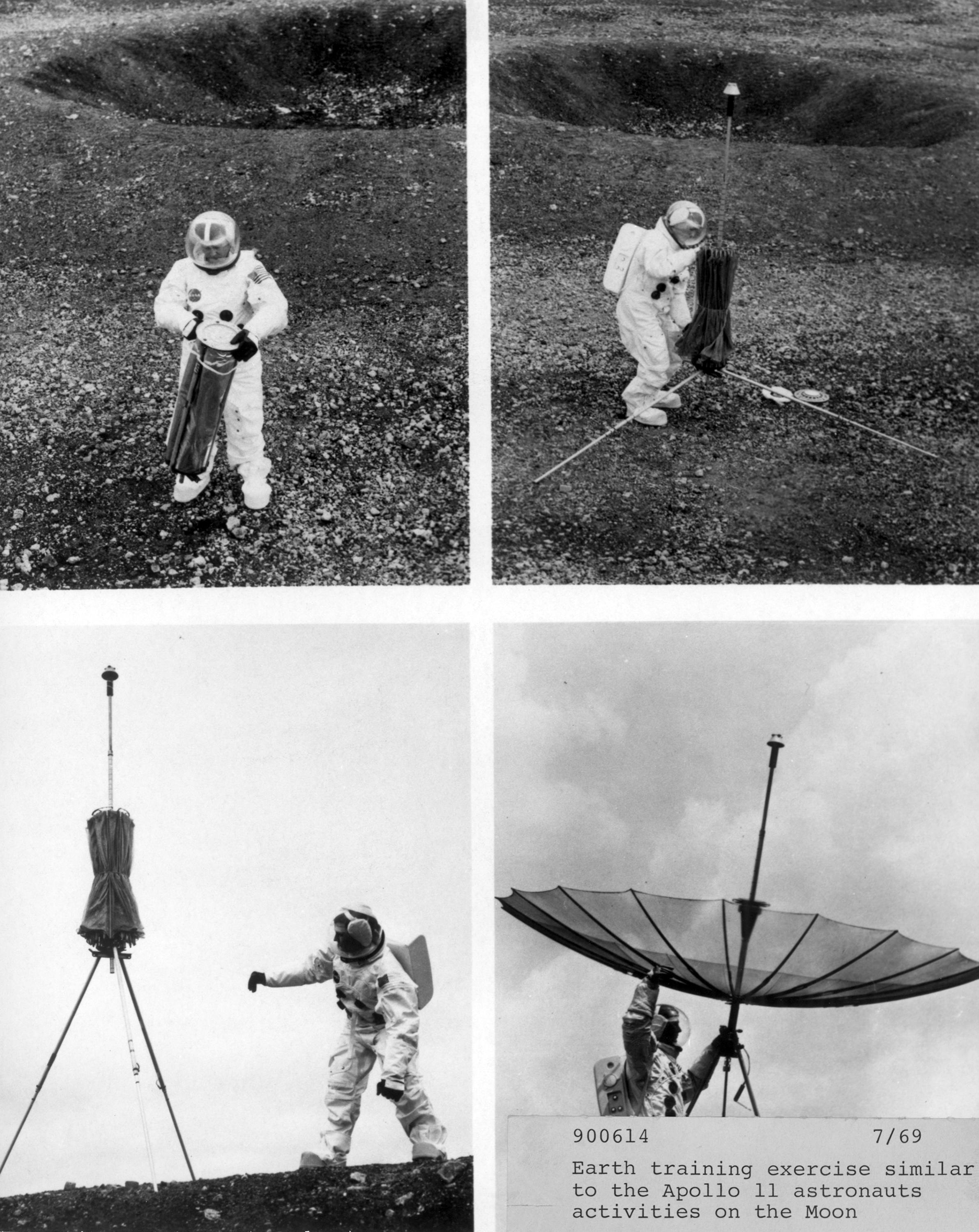
An engineer, Bob Mason, donned in a space suit, goes through activities similar to those planned for Apollo 11 astronauts Neil Armstrong and Edwin Aldrin during their moon walk

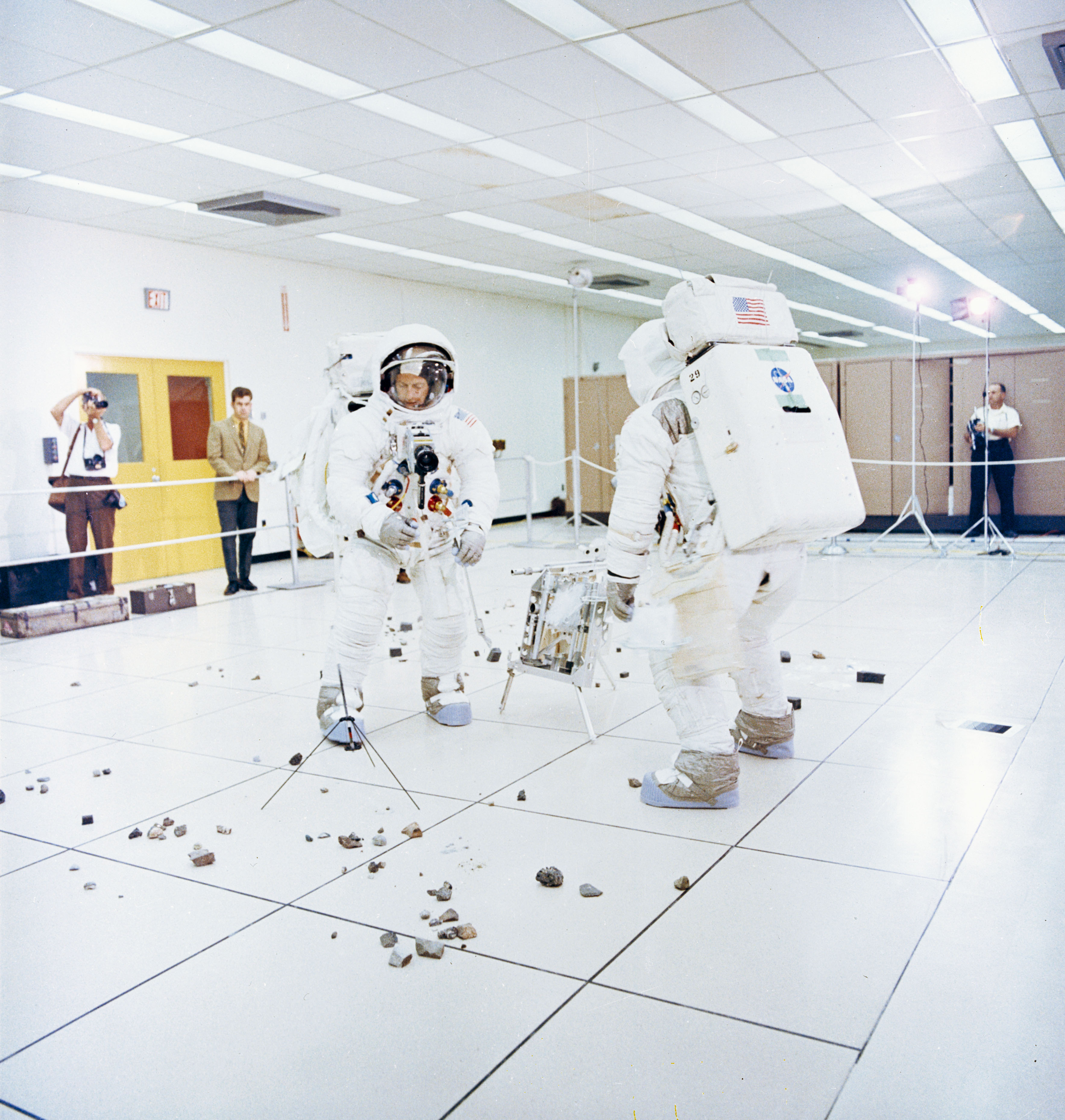
Apollo 12 astronaut Charles Conrad Jr. (facing camera) simulates picking up samples. Astronaut Alan L. Bean simulates photographic lunar rock sample documentation.

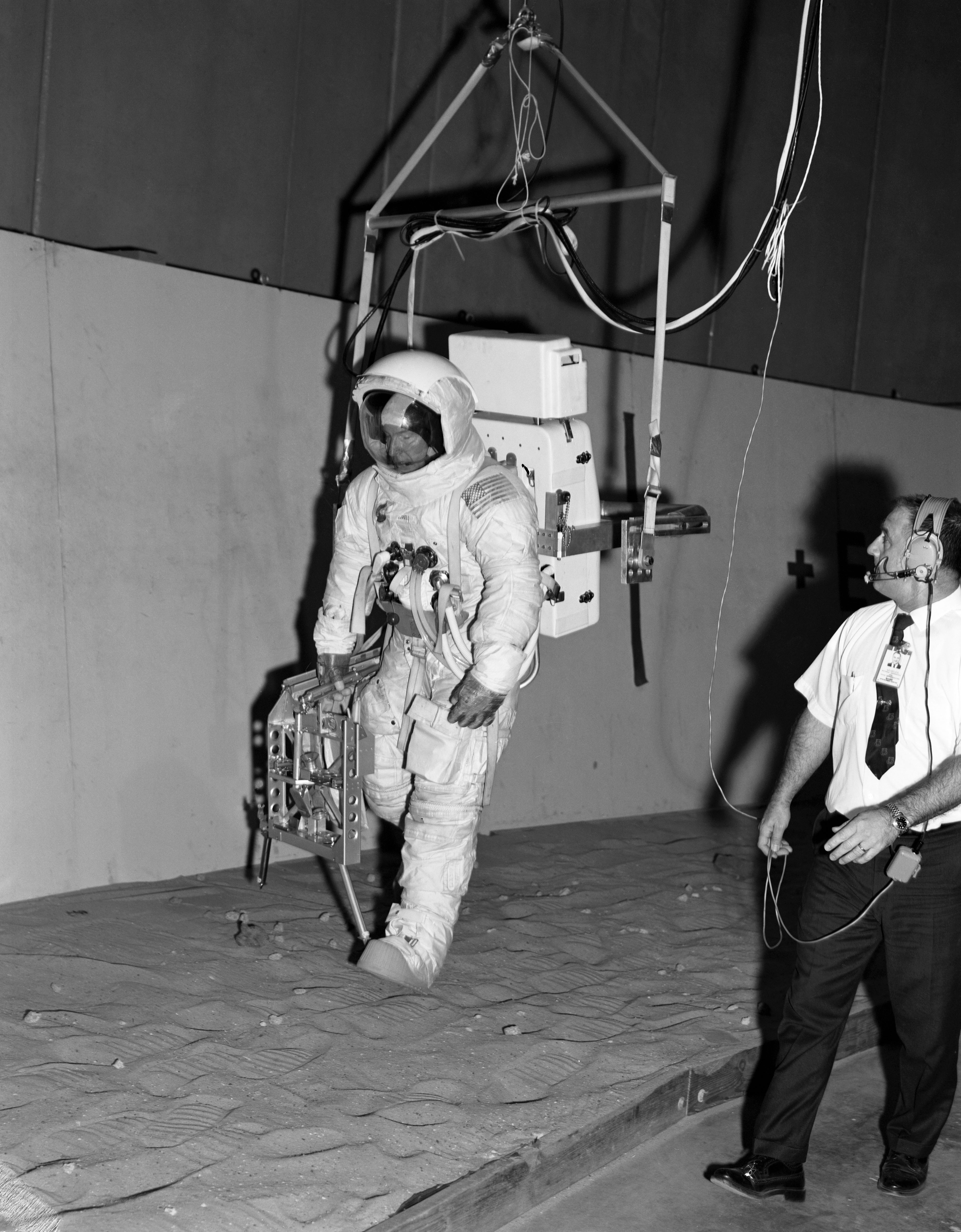
Apollo 13 astronaut James Lovel during lunar surface simulation training

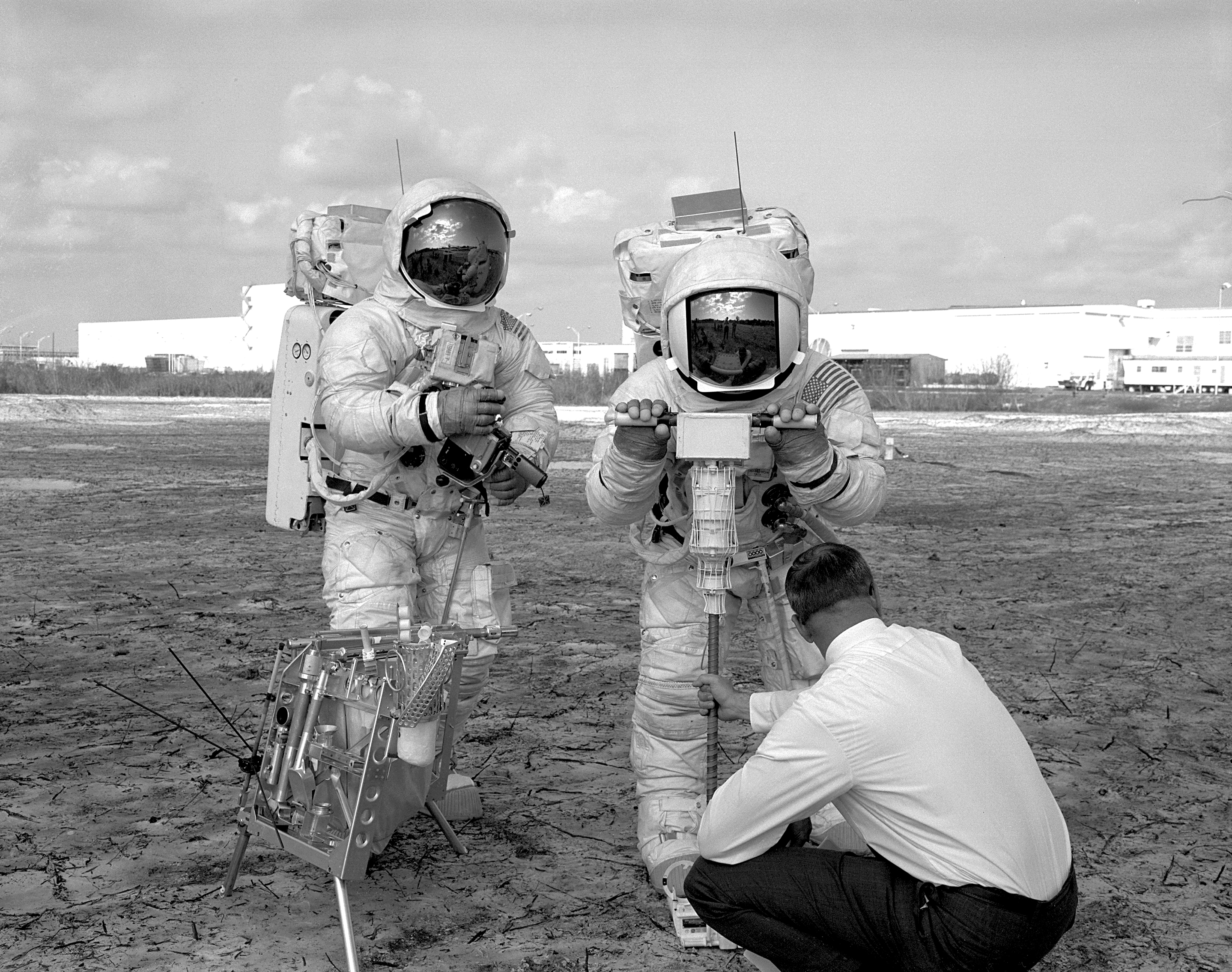
Apollo 13's Fred W. Haise Jr. tries out a motorized core sampler

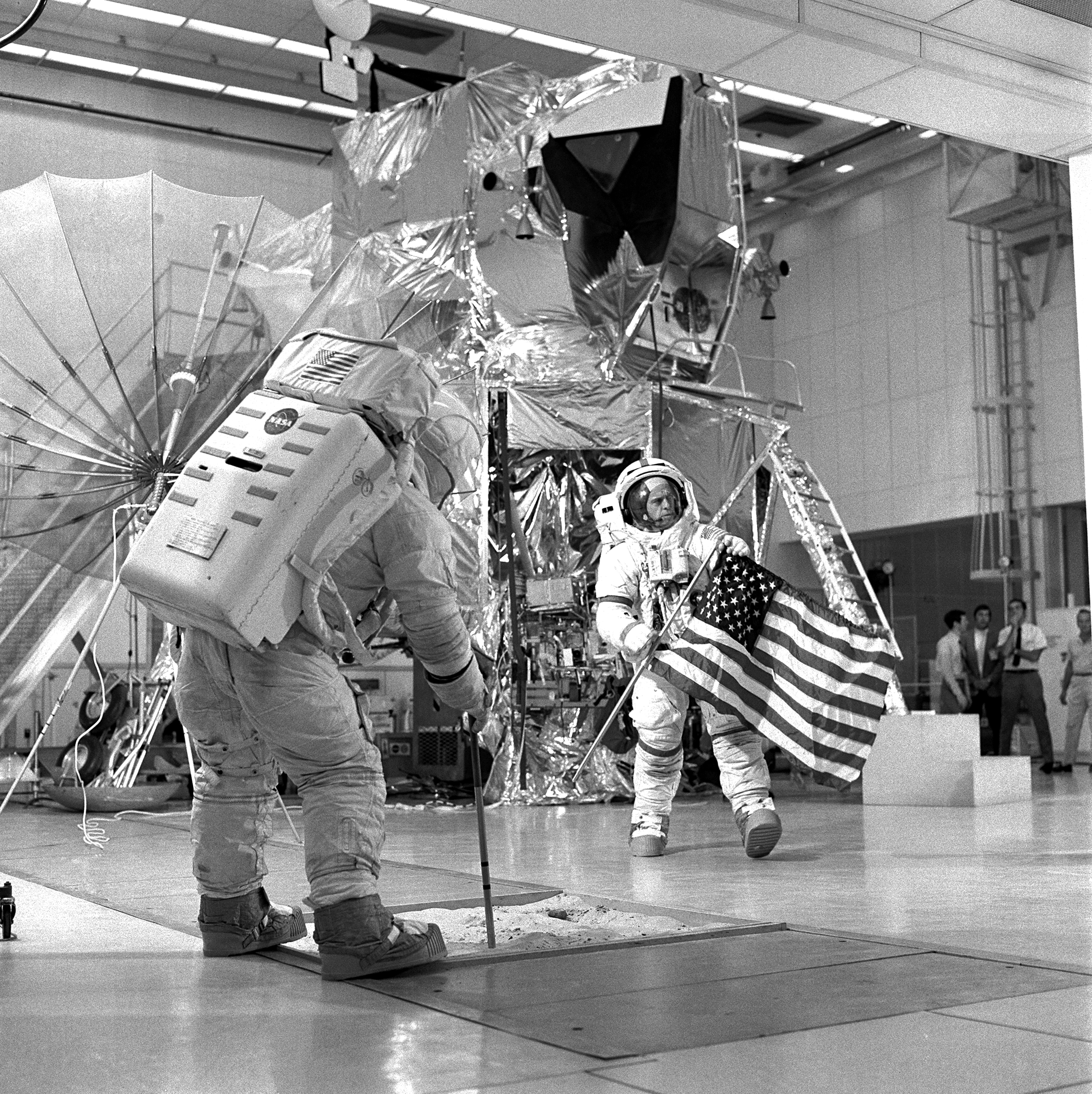
Apollo 14 EVA training with a US flag

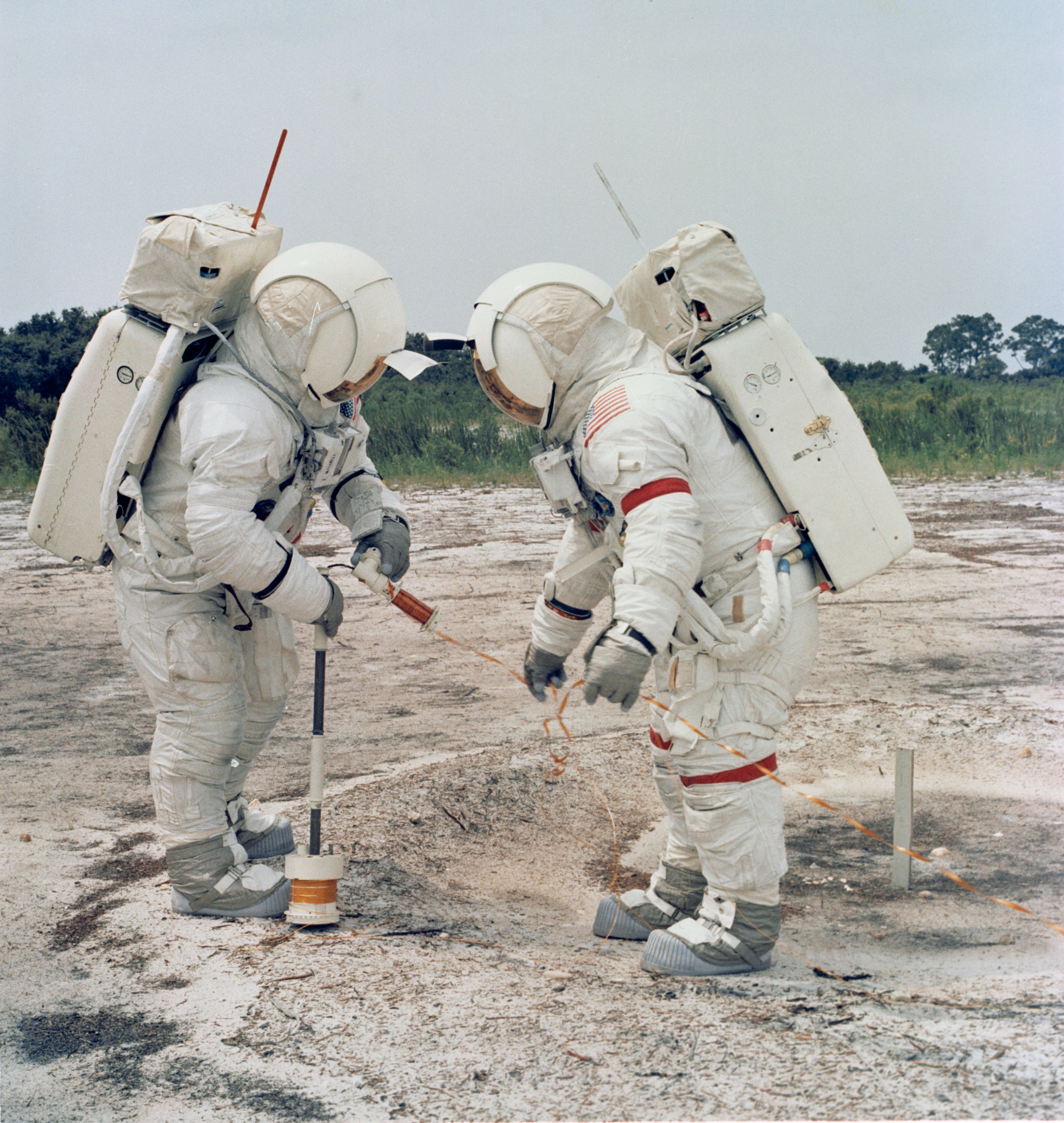
Apollo 14 astronauts Alan B. Shepard Jr. (right) and Edgar D. Mitchell practice using the Active Seismic Experiment (ASE) to set off explosions on the lunar surface and arm a mortar to launch four grenades after they leave.

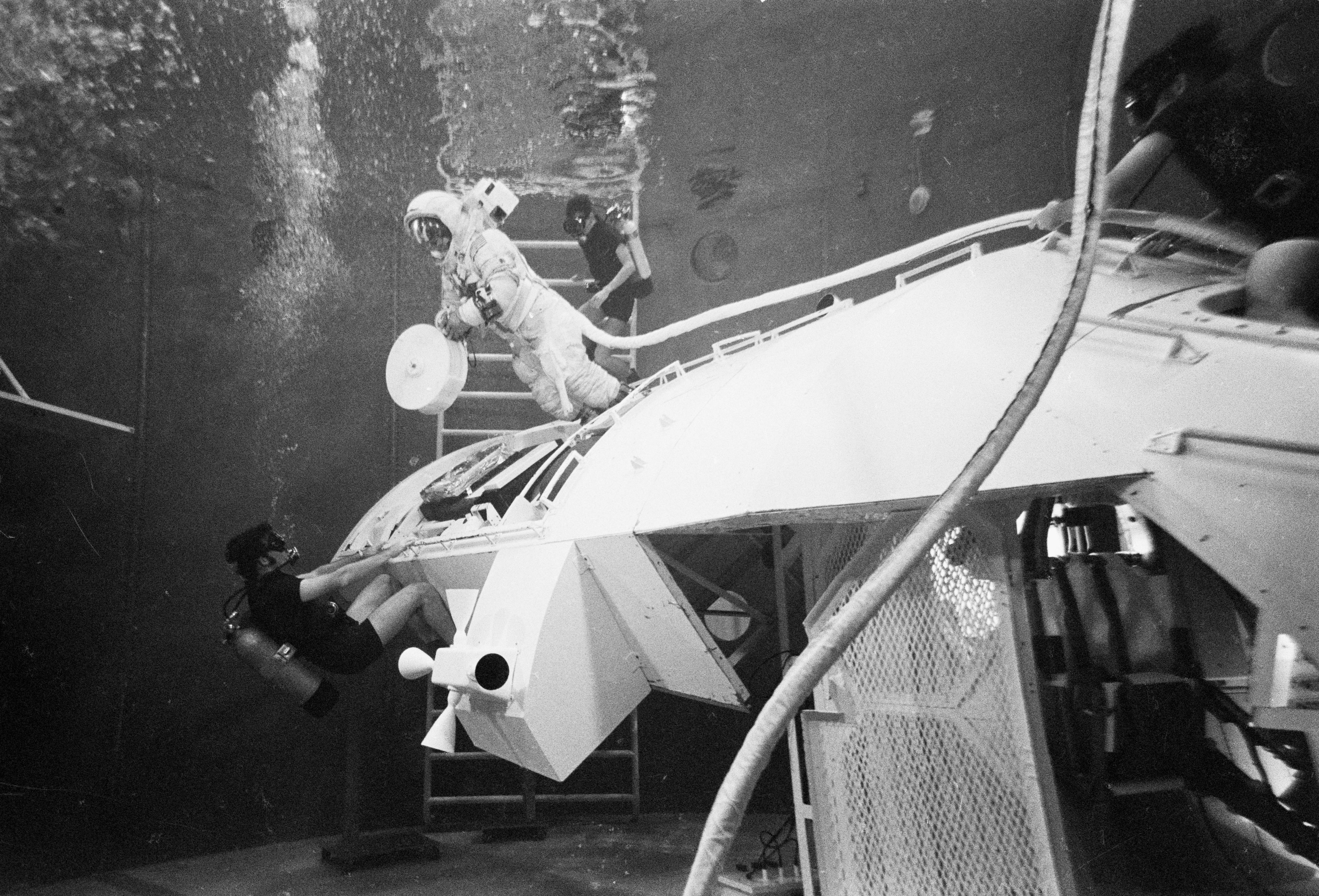
Apollo 16's astronaut Thomas K. Mattingly II participates in EVA simulations in the water facility tank

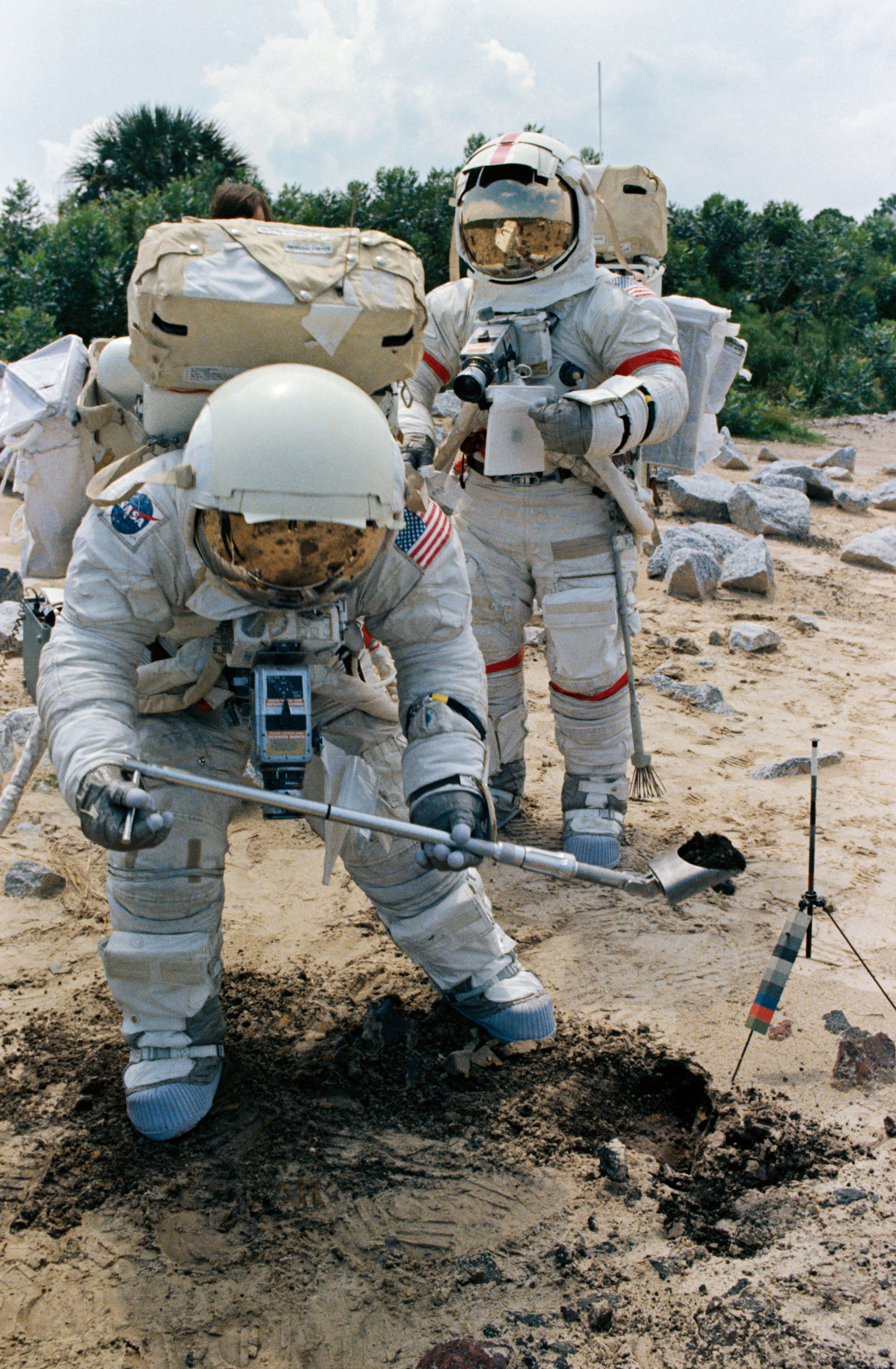
Apollo 17's astronaut Harrison H. Schmitt (foreground) simulates scooping up lunar sample material. Astronaut Eugene A. Cernan (background) holds a sample bag.

== Photography training ==
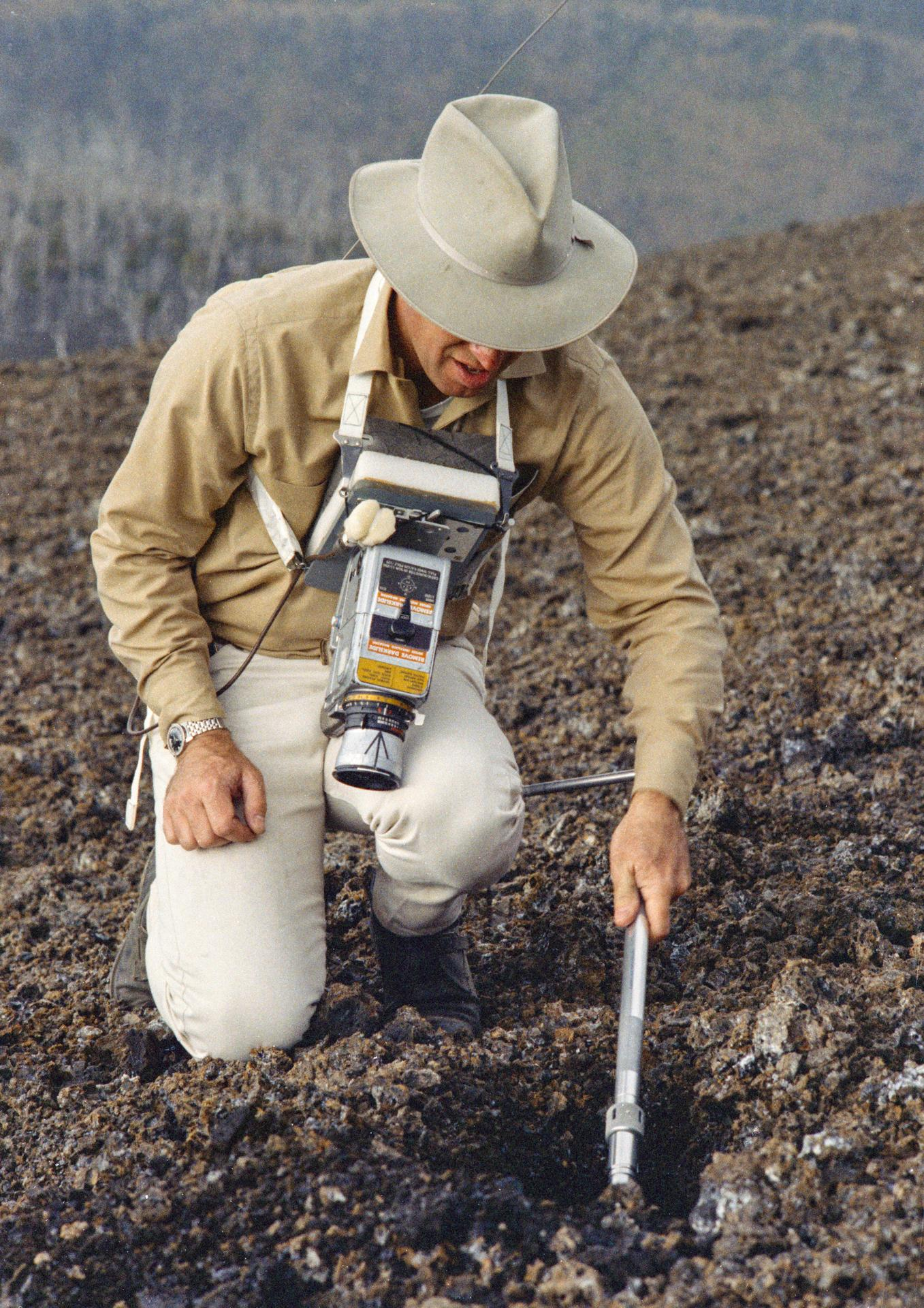
Astronaut James A. Lovell Jr. with a Hasselblad camera uses a scoop from the Apollo Lunar Hand Tools (ALHT) during a simulated lunar surface traverse at the Kapoho, Hawaii training site.

Over the several years prior to the Moon missions, scientific and photographic training was provided to the astronauts. They were encouraged to take training cameras on trips to become more familiar with the camera operation and to enhance their photographic technique. Tutorials were provided to the crews on the equipment, its operation, and on the scientific purposes. The crews visited geologic sites in Nevada, Arizona, and Hawaii, frequently simulating their lunar traverse, completely outfitted with sample bags, checklists, simulated backpacks, lunar rock hammer, core-sampling equipment, and typically using Hasselblad EL cameras similar to those they would use on the Moon. As the use of the camera was mostly automated, the most crucial training was in pointing the camera which was attached to their chest control packs for the suit's environmental control system. The astronaut would point his body in order to aim the cameras. Films taken during the practice exercises were processed and returned to the crewmen who would study the results.

== Legacy ==
Artemis II crew members trained in Iceland in 2023, visiting volcanic terrain near Vatnajökull that Apollo-era geologists had first selected in 1965. The USGS Astrogeology Science Center, established in Flagstaff to support Apollo, continues to operate and developed the Terrestrial Analogs for Research and Geologic Exploration Training (TARGET) program in 2019 to provide analog-site resources for future lunar and planetary missions.

== See also ==
- Geology of the Moon
- Astronaut Monument in Iceland for astronauts who trained there
