= Integrated Software for Imagers and Spectrometers =

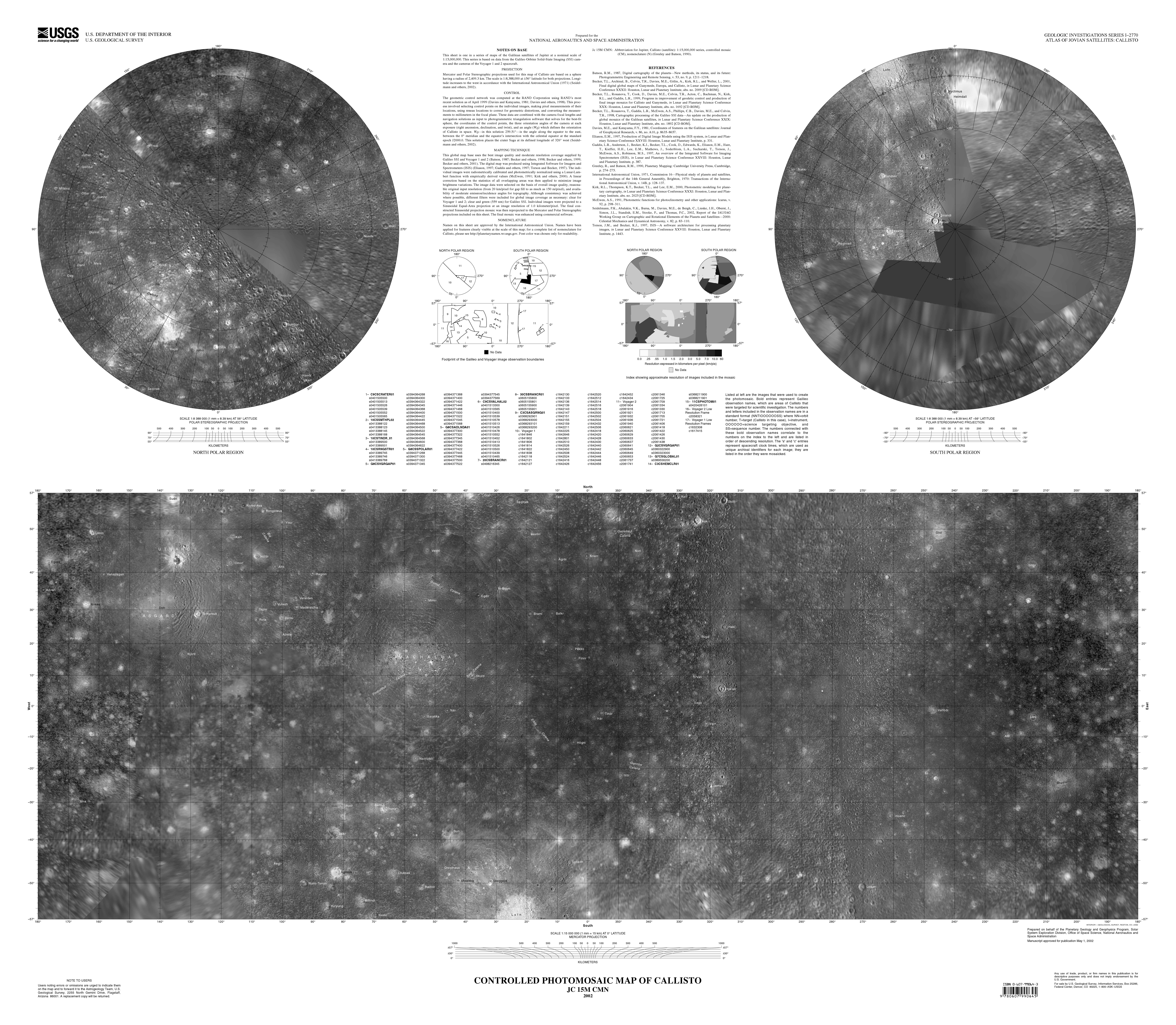
- USGS map of Callisto - Created with Isis
- Developer: USGS Astrogeology - Flagstaff
- Initial release: 1971
- Stable release: 3.3.0 / 11 October 2011; 14 years ago
- Operating system: Cross-platform
- License: Public domain software
- Website: isis.astrogeology.usgs.gov

Integrated Software for Imagers and Spectrometers (Isis) is a specialized software package developed by the USGS to process images and spectra collected by current and past NASA planetary missions sent to Earth's Moon, Mars, Jupiter, Saturn, and other solar system bodies.

== History ==
The history of ISIS began in 1971 at the United States Geological Survey (USGS) in Flagstaff, Arizona.

Isis was developed in 1989, primarily to support the Galileo NIMS instrument.

It contains standard image processing capabilities (such as image algebra, filters, statistics) for both 2D images and 3D data cubes, as well as mission-specific data processing capabilities and cartographic rendering functions.

== Raster data format name ==
Family of related formats that are used by the USGS Planetary Cartography group to store and distribute planetary imagery data.

- PDS, Planetary Data System
- ISIS2, USGS Astrogeology Isis cube (Version 2)
- ISIS3, USGS Astrogeology ISIS Cube (Version 3)

== See also ==
- Ames Stereo Pipeline
