= Robotic Lunar Observatory =

Observatory funded by NASA

- Alternative names: ROLO
- Organization: NASA and USGS
- Location: Flagstaff, Arizona
- Coordinates: 35.2148°N 111.6344°W
- Altitude: 2,146 meters (7,041 ft)
- Established: 1995
- Website: Lunar Calibration – ROLO

Telescopes
- unnamed telescopes: 20 cm reflector (×2)

The Robotic Lunar Observatory (ROLO) is an astronomical observatory funded by NASA and located at the United States Geological Survey Flagstaff Science Campus atop McMillan Mesa in Flagstaff, Arizona. Its purpose is to enable the Moon to be used as a radiometric calibration reference for Earth-orbiting remote-sensing spacecraft instruments. The ROLO project is currently ongoing, but the program ceased observations in September 2003. The facility is maintained for calibration and instrument characterization purposes. It consists of two 20 cm (7.9 in) Ritchey-Chrétien telescopes attached to an equatorial mount made by DFM Engineering. One telescope is fitted with a sensor optimized for visible and near-infrared (VNIR) wavelengths, while the other is tuned to short-wavelength infrared (SWIR). The VNIR camera began operations in 1995 and the SWIR camera in 1997.

== See also ==
- Lowell Observatory
- Astrogeology Research Program
- List of astronomical observatories
