= Astrogeology Research Program =

Division of the US Geological Survey which studies planetary geology and cartography

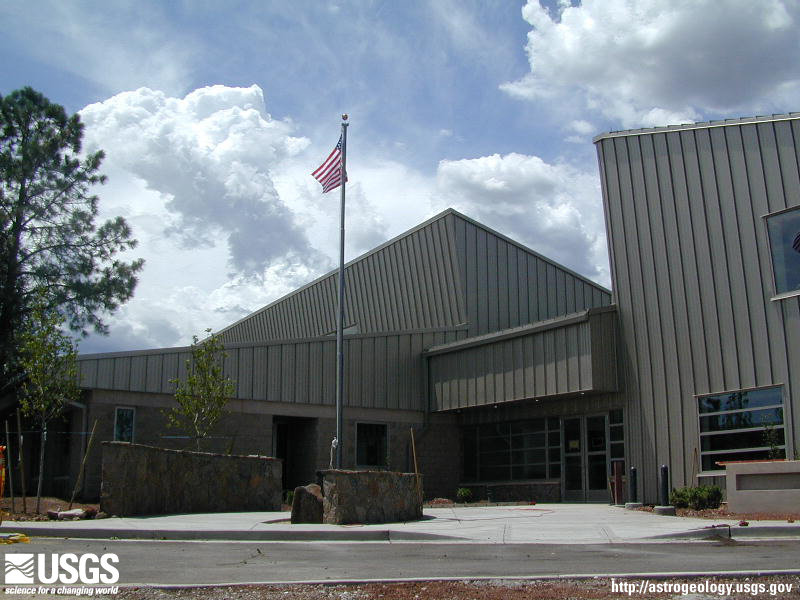
The USGS Shoemaker Building, located on the campus of the Flagstaff Science Center, is the home of the Astrogeology Science Center

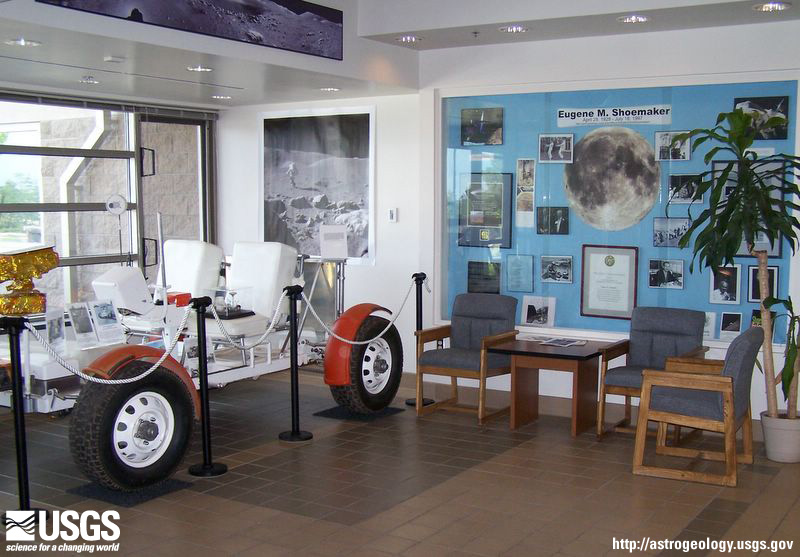
Displays in the entryway of the USGS Shoemaker Building, featuring Grover, a version of the lunar rovers used to train astronauts in Flagstaff, Arizona.

The Astrogeology Science Center is the entity within the United States Geological Survey concerned with the study of planetary geology and planetary cartography. It is housed in the Shoemaker Building in Flagstaff, Arizona. The Center was established in 1963 by Eugene Merle Shoemaker to provide lunar geologic mapping and to assist in training astronauts destined for the Moon as part of the Apollo program.

Since its inception, the Astrogeology Science Center has participated in processing and analyzing data from various missions to the planetary bodies in the Solar System, assisting in finding potential landing sites for exploration vehicles, mapping our neighboring planets and their moons, and conducting research to better understand the origins, evolutions, and geologic processes operating on these bodies.

== The early days ==
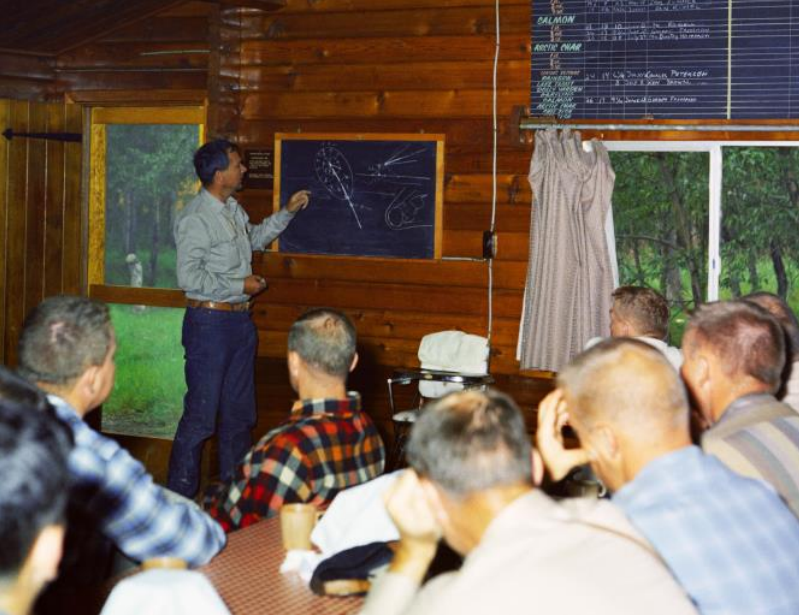
Shoemaker training astronauts at Brooks Camp, Katmai National Park

Gene Shoemaker founded the Astrogeology Research Program August 25, 1960. The research program started out as the Astrogeologic Studies Group at the United States Geological Survey center in Menlo Park, California. The research program was moved to Flagstaff, Arizona (starting in December 1962 and completed in 1963). Flagstaff was chosen as the location due to its proximity to Meteor Crater and the volcanic craters and lava flows of the San Francisco volcanic field. Shoemaker retired from the USGS in 1993. He remained on Emeritus status with the USGS and maintained an affiliation with Lowell Observatory until his death in a car accident in Australia in 1997.

Shoemaker was involved in the Lunar Ranger and Surveyor programs and continued with the crewed Apollo programs.!He culminated his lunar studies in 1994 with new data on the Moon from Project Clementine, for which he was the science-team leader. He collaborated closely with his wife, Carolyn, a planetary astronomer. The impact of Comet Shoemaker-Levy into Jupiter in 1994 was widely publicized.

Starting in 1963, the Astrogeology Science Center played an important role in training astronauts destined to explore the lunar surface and in supporting the testing of equipment for both crewed and uncrewed missions.

As part of the astronauts' training, USGS and NASA geoscientists gave lectures and field trips during the 1960s and early 1970s on the basics of terrestrial and lunar geology. Field trips included excursions into the Grand Canyon to demonstrate the development of geologic structure over time; Lowell Observatory (Flagstaff), Kitt Peak National Observatory (Tucson) and the Naval Observatory Flagstaff Station, NOFS (Flagstaff); Meteor Crater east of Flagstaff, the Sunset Crater cinder cone, and nearby lava flows in the Flagstaff area.

The volcanic fields around Flagstaff have proven particularly useful in testing equipment and training astronauts. Cameras planned for use in the Surveyor project were tested on the Bonito Flow in Sunset Crater National Park because the lava flow appeared to be similar to flows on the lunar surface. A field of artificial impact craters was created in the Cinder Lakes volcanic field near Flagstaff to create a surface similar to the proposed first crewed American landing site on the Moon.

Jack Schmitt joined the Astrogeology team as a geologist at the Flagstaff Science Center in 1964, having recently earned a doctorate degree from Harvard University. In addition to assisting in the geologic mapping of the Moon, he led the Lunar Field Geological Methods project. When NASA announced a special recruitment for scientist-astronauts in late 1964, Schmitt applied. Out of more than 1,000 applicants, six were chosen. Of those six, Joe Kerwin, Owen Garriott, and Edward Gibson would fly in the Skylab missions in 1973 and 1974, and Schmitt would go to the Moon on the Apollo 17 mission.

== Astrogeology today ==
Today, the mission of the USGS Astrogeology Science Center is to serve the nation, the international planetary science community, and the general public's pursuit of new knowledge of the Solar System by:

- Conducting innovative, fundamental research that advances the fields of planetary cartography, geoscience, and remote sensing.
- Developing state-of-the-art software and techniques for the scientific and cartographic analysis of planetary remote sensing data.
- Participating in the collaborative planning and operation of space exploration missions.
- Producing accurate cartographic products, recognized internationally as benchmarks.
- Establishing data archive and mapping standards that foster international consistency.
- Archiving and distributing data and products for efficient access through modern technology.

The USGS Astrogeology Science Center participates in all phases of spaceflight missions across the Solar System. This includes providing scientific input for mission planning, creating foundational geospatial data products, supplying landing site maps and characterization, tactical operations of rovers and orbiters, and assuring the long-term accessibility of the data returned from these missions.

Historic, recent, ongoing, and upcoming space missions involving the USGS Astrogeology Research Program include:

- Lunar Reconnaissance Orbiter
- Mars Reconnaissance Orbiter
- Cassini-Huygens Mission to Saturn
- Mars Exploration Rover Mission
- Mars Odyssey
- Clementine (lunar orbiter)
- Lunar Orbiter program
- Voyager
- Galileo (orbiting Jupiter)
- Mariner 10
- Mars Pathfinder
- Mars Global Surveyor
- Mars Observer, Mars Polar Lander, and Mars Climate Orbiter
- Mars Science Laboratory
- Deep Space 1
- Lunar Prospector
- NEAR Shoemaker (Near-Earth Asteroid Rendezvous)
- Magellan (Venus radar-mapping orbiter)

== See also ==
- Integrated Software for Imagers and Spectrometers (ISIS) – USGS software which processes images and spectra
- Robotic Lunar Observatory

== External links and references ==
- USGS Astrogeology Science Center
- USGS Flagstaff Science Center
