= Astronaut training =

Preparing astronauts for space missions

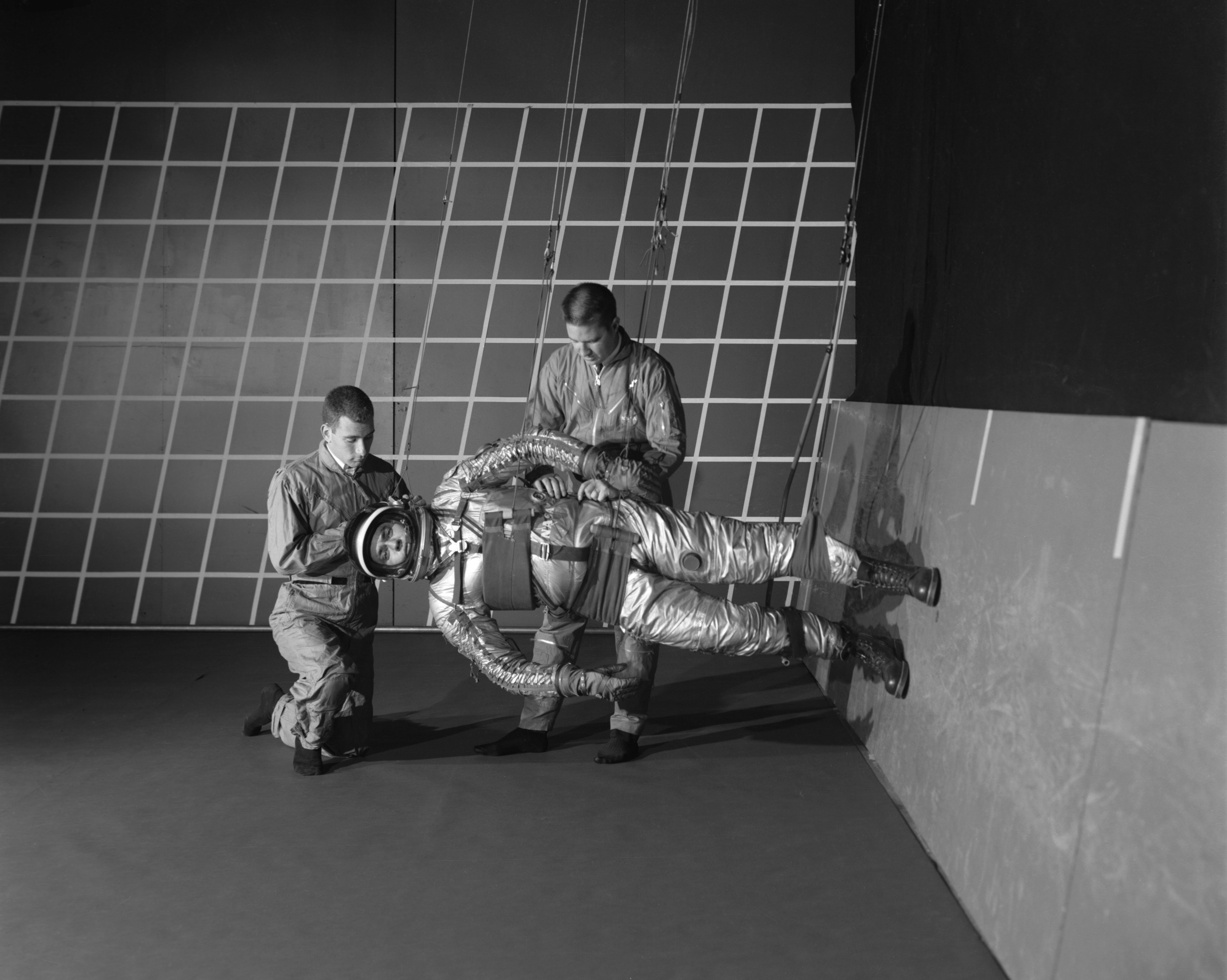
A test subject being suited up for studies on the Reduced Gravity Walking Simulator. This position meant that a person's legs experienced only one sixth of their weight, which was the equivalent of being on the lunar surface. The purpose of this simulator was to study the subject while walking, jumping or running. (1963)

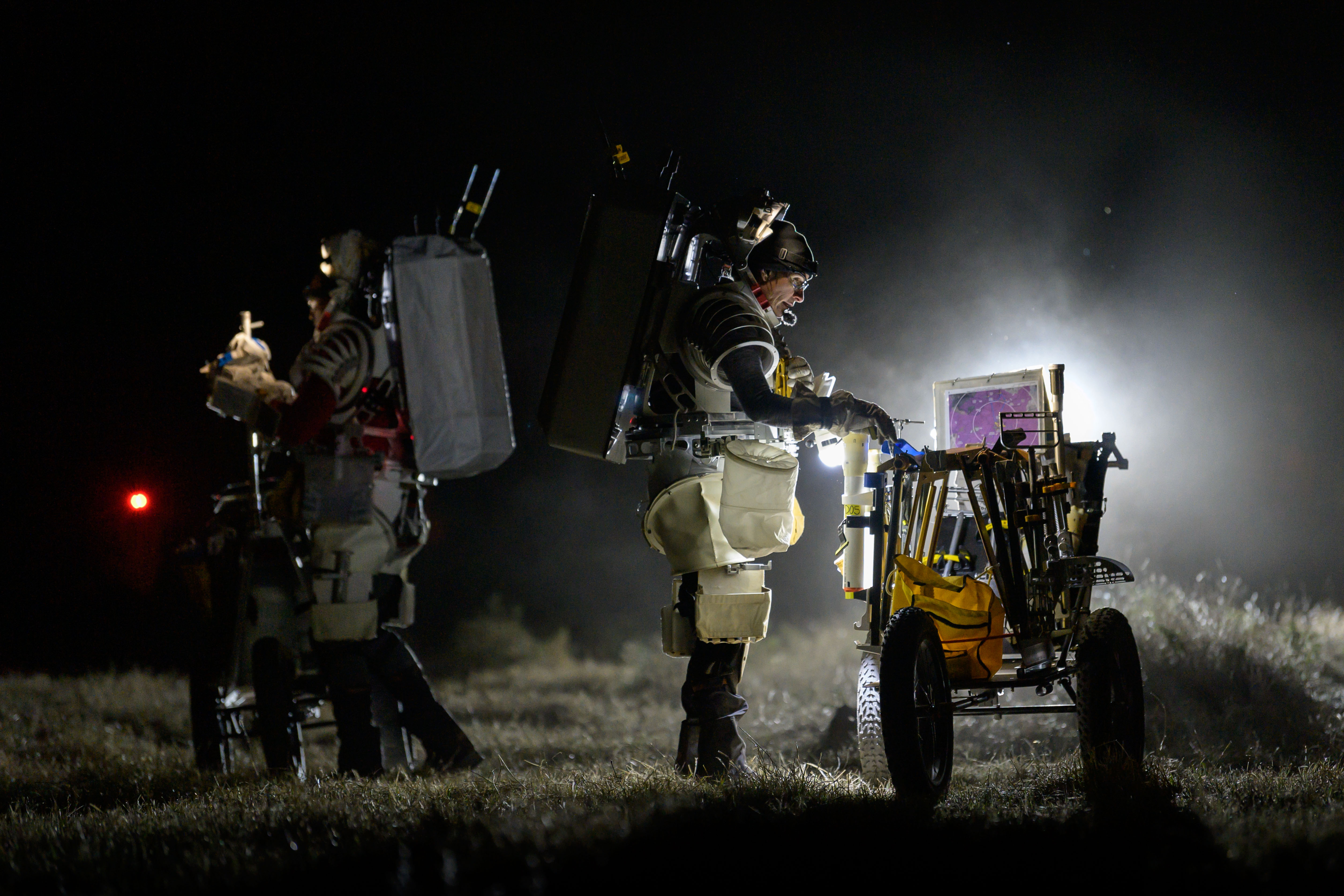
Astronauts of the Artemis program on a nighttime simulated moonwalk in the San Francisco Volcanic Field in Northern Arizona on May 16, 2024.

Astronaut training describes the complex process of preparing astronauts in regions around the world for their space missions before, during and after the flight, which includes medical tests, physical training, extra-vehicular activity (EVA) training, wilderness survival training, water survival training, robotics training, procedure training, rehabilitation process, as well as training on experiments they will perform during their stay in space.

Virtual and physical training facilities have been integrated to familiarize astronauts with the conditions they will encounter during all phases of flight and prepare astronauts for a microgravity environment. Special considerations must be made during training to ensure a safe and successful mission, which is why the Apollo astronauts received training for geology field work on the Lunar surface and why research is being conducted on best practices for future extended missions, such as trips to Mars.

== Purpose of training ==
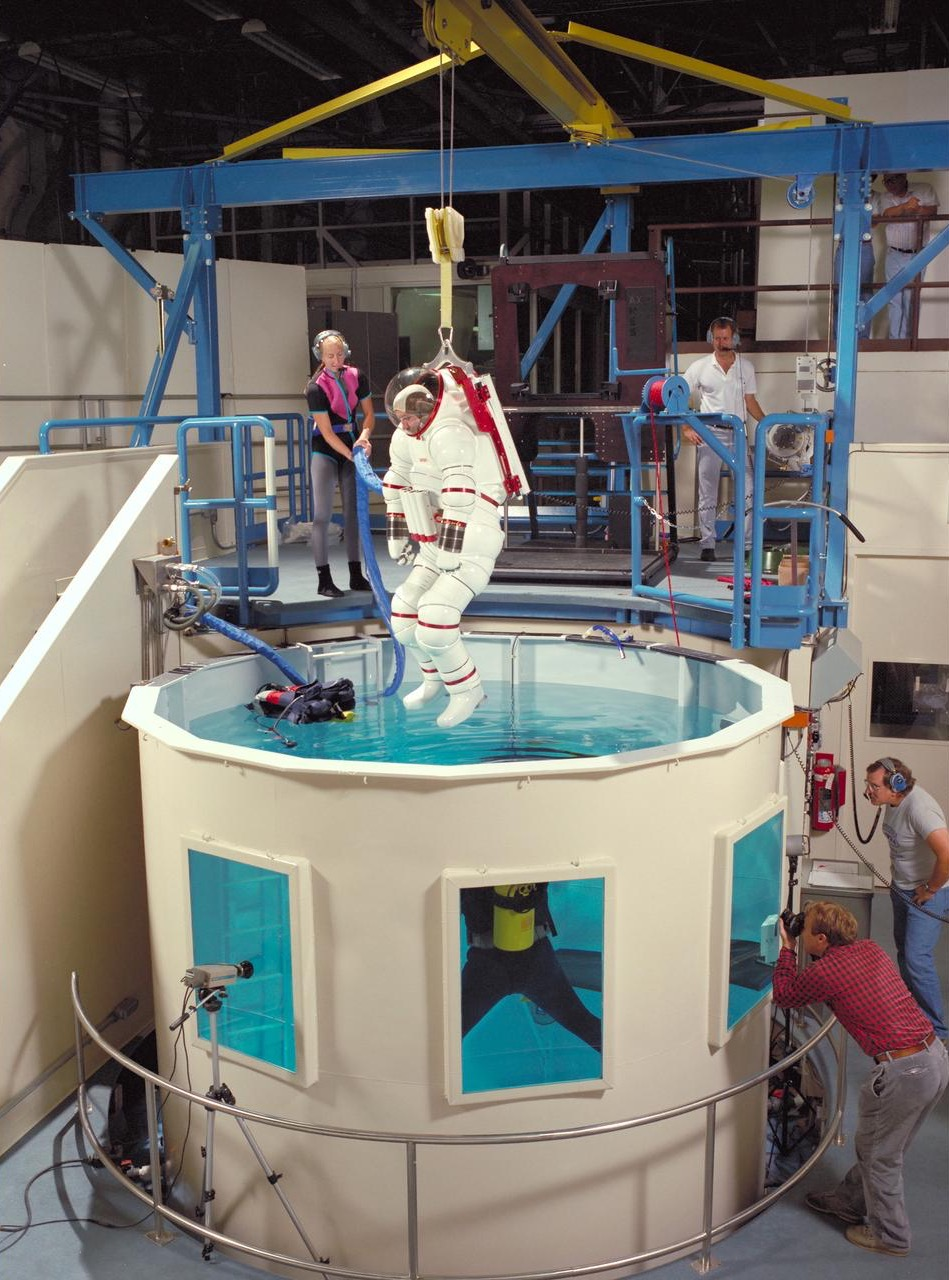
NASA astronaut tests spacesuit designs and practice spacewalks in water tank

=== Training flow ===
The selection and training of astronauts are integrated processes to ensure the crew members are qualified for space missions. The training is categorized into five objectives to train the astronauts on the general and specific aspects: basic training, advanced training, mission-specific training, onboard training, and proficiency maintenance training. The trainees must learn medicine, language, robotics and piloting, space system engineering, the organization of space systems, and the acronyms in aerospace engineering during the basic training. While 60% to 80% of the astronauts will experience space motion sickness, including pallor, cold sweating, vomiting, and anorexia, the astronaut candidates are expected to overcome the sickness. During the advanced training and the mission specific training, astronauts will learn about the operation of specific systems and skills required associated with their assigned positions in a space mission. The mission specific training typically requires 18 months to complete for Space Shuttle and International Space Station crews. It is important to ensure the astronauts' well-being, physical and mental health prior, during, and after the mission period. Proficiency maintenance aims to help the crew members to maintain a minimum level of performance, including topics such as extravehicular activity, robotics, language, diving, and flight training.

=== Launch and landing ===
The effects of launching and landing have various effects on astronauts, with the most significant effects that occur being space motion sickness, orthostatic intolerance, and cardiovascular events.

Space motion sickness is an event that can occur within minutes of being in changing gravity environments (i.e. from 1g on Earth prior to launch to more than 1g during launch, and then from microgravity in space to hypergravity during re-entry and again to 1g after landing). The symptoms range from drowsiness and headaches, to nausea and vomiting. There are three general categories of space motion sickness:

- Mild: One to several transient symptoms, no operational impact
- Moderate: Several symptoms of persistent nature, minimal operational impact
- Severe: Several symptoms of persistent nature, significant impact on performance

About three-fourths of astronauts experience space motion sickness, with effects rarely exceeding two days.

There is a risk for post-flight motion sickness, however this is only significant following long-duration space missions. Post-flight, following exposure to microgravity, the vestibular system, located in the inner ear is disrupted because of the microgravity-induced unresponsiveness of the otoliths which are small calcareous concretions that sense body postures and are responsible for ensuring proper balance. In most cases, this leads to some postflight postural illusions.

Cardiovascular events represent important factors during the three phases of a space mission. They can be divided in:

- Pre-existing cardiovascular diseases: these are typically selected-out during astronaut selection, but if they are present in an astronaut they can worsen over the course of the spaceflight.
- Cardiovascular events and changes occurring during spaceflight: these are due to body fluids shift and redistribution, heart rhythm disturbances and decrease in maximal exercise capacity in the micro gravity environment. These effects can potentially lead the crew to be severely incapacitated upon return to a gravitational environment and thus unable to egress a spacecraft without assistance.
- Orthostatic intolerance leading to syncope during post-flight stand test.

=== On-orbit operations ===
Astronauts are trained in preparation for the conditions of launch as well as the harsh environment of space. This training aims to prepare the crew for events falling under two broad categories: events relating to operation of the spacecraft (internal events), and events relating to the space environment (external events)

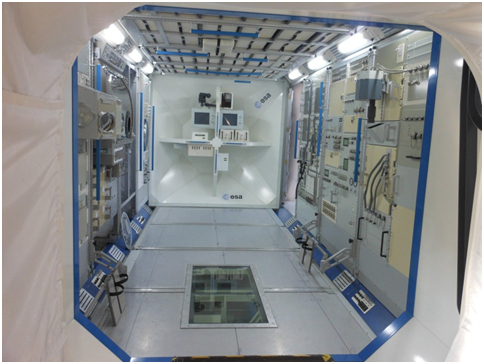
An internal view of European Space Agency's (ESA) Columbus module training mockup, located at the European Astronaut Centre in Cologne, Germany. Astronauts must familiarize themselves with all the spacecraft components during their training.

During training, astronauts are familiarized with the engineering systems of the spacecraft including spacecraft propulsion, spacecraft thermal control, and life support systems. In addition to this, astronauts receive training in orbital mechanics, scientific experimentation, earth observation, and astronomy. This training is particularly important for missions when an astronaut will encounter multiple systems (for example on the International Space Station (ISS)). Training is performed in order to prepare astronauts for events that may pose a hazard to their health, the health of the crew, or the successful completion of the mission. These types of events may be: failure of a critical life support system, capsule depressurization, fire, and other life-threatening events. In addition to the need to train for hazardous events, astronauts will also need to train to ensure the successful completion of their mission. This could be in the form of training for EVA, scientific experimentation, or spacecraft piloting.

==== External events ====
External events refer more broadly to the ability to live and work in the extreme environment of space. This includes adaptation to microgravity (or weightlessness), isolation, confinement, and radiation. The difficulties associated with living and working in microgravity include spatial disorientation, motion sickness, and vertigo. During long-duration missions, astronauts will often experience isolation and confinement. This has been known to limit performance of astronaut crews and hence training aims to prepare astronauts for such challenges. The long-term effects of radiation on crews is still largely unknown. However, it is theorized that astronauts on a trip to Mars will likely receive more than 1000x the radiation dosage of a typical person on Earth. As such, present and future training must incorporate systems and processes for protecting astronauts against radiation.

=== Science experiments ===
Scientific experimentation are the primary focus of the International Space Station, and is a mandatory part of training. Once on-orbit, communication between astronauts and scientists on the ground can be limited, so astronauts must be familiar with their assigned experiments.

For missions to the ISS, each astronaut is required to become proficient at one hundred or more experiments. During training, the scientists responsible for the experiments do not have direct contact with the astronauts who will be carrying them out. Instead, scientists instruct trainers who in turn prepare the astronauts for carrying out the experiment. Much of this training is done at the European Astronaut Center.

For human experiments, scientists describe their experiments to astronauts who then choose whether to participate on board the ISS. For these experiments, the astronauts will be tested before, during, and after the mission to establish a baseline and determine when the astronaut returned to the baseline.

== Training by region ==
=== United States ===
At NASA, following the selection phase, the so-called "AsCans" (Astronaut candidates) have to undergo up to two years of training to become fully qualified astronauts. Initially, all AsCans must go through basic training to learn both technical and soft skills. There are 16 different technical courses in:

- Life support systems
- Orbital mechanics
- Payload deployment
- Earth observations
- Space physiology and medicine

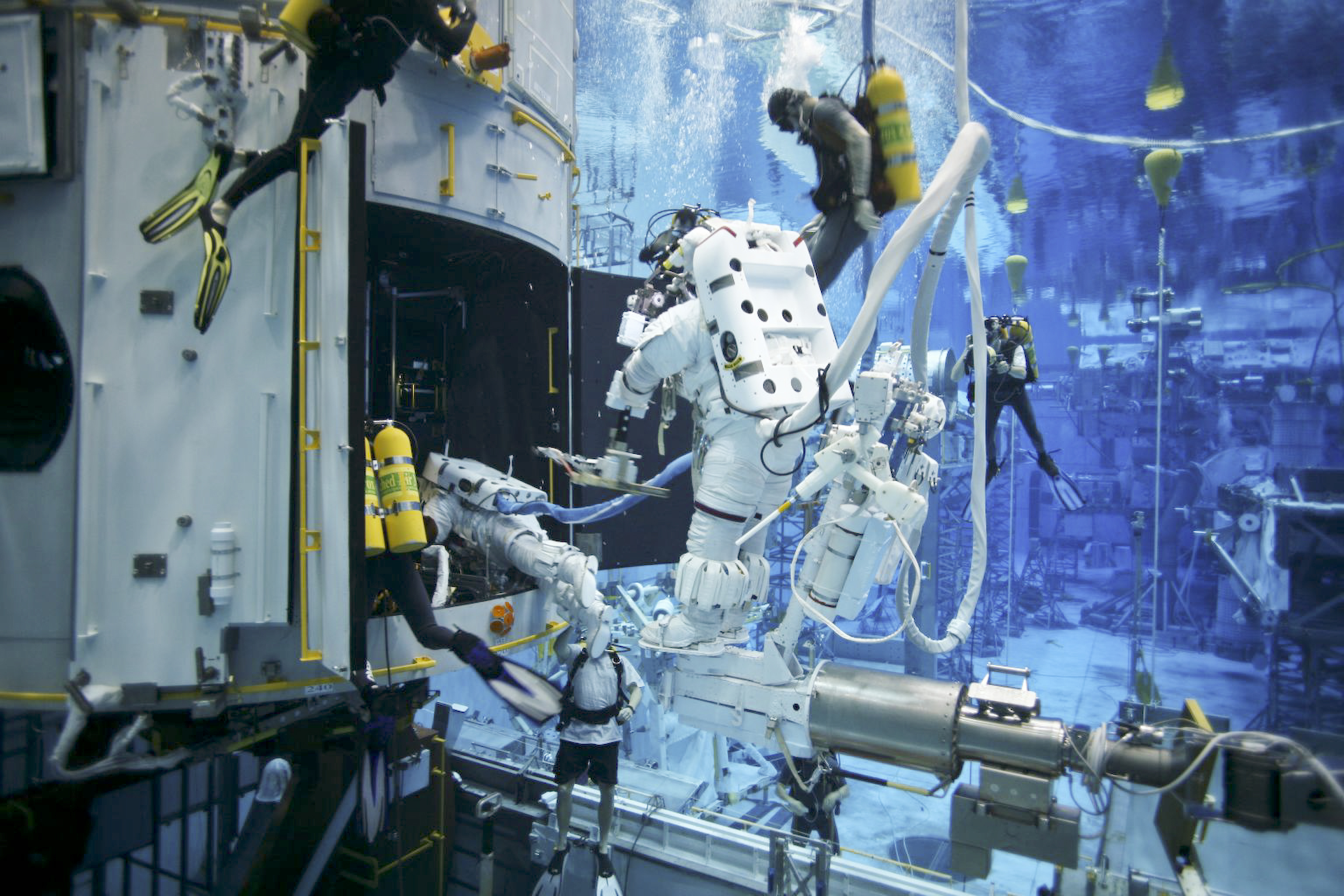
Astronauts train in the Neutral Buoyancy Facility at the Johnson Space Center in Houston, Texas

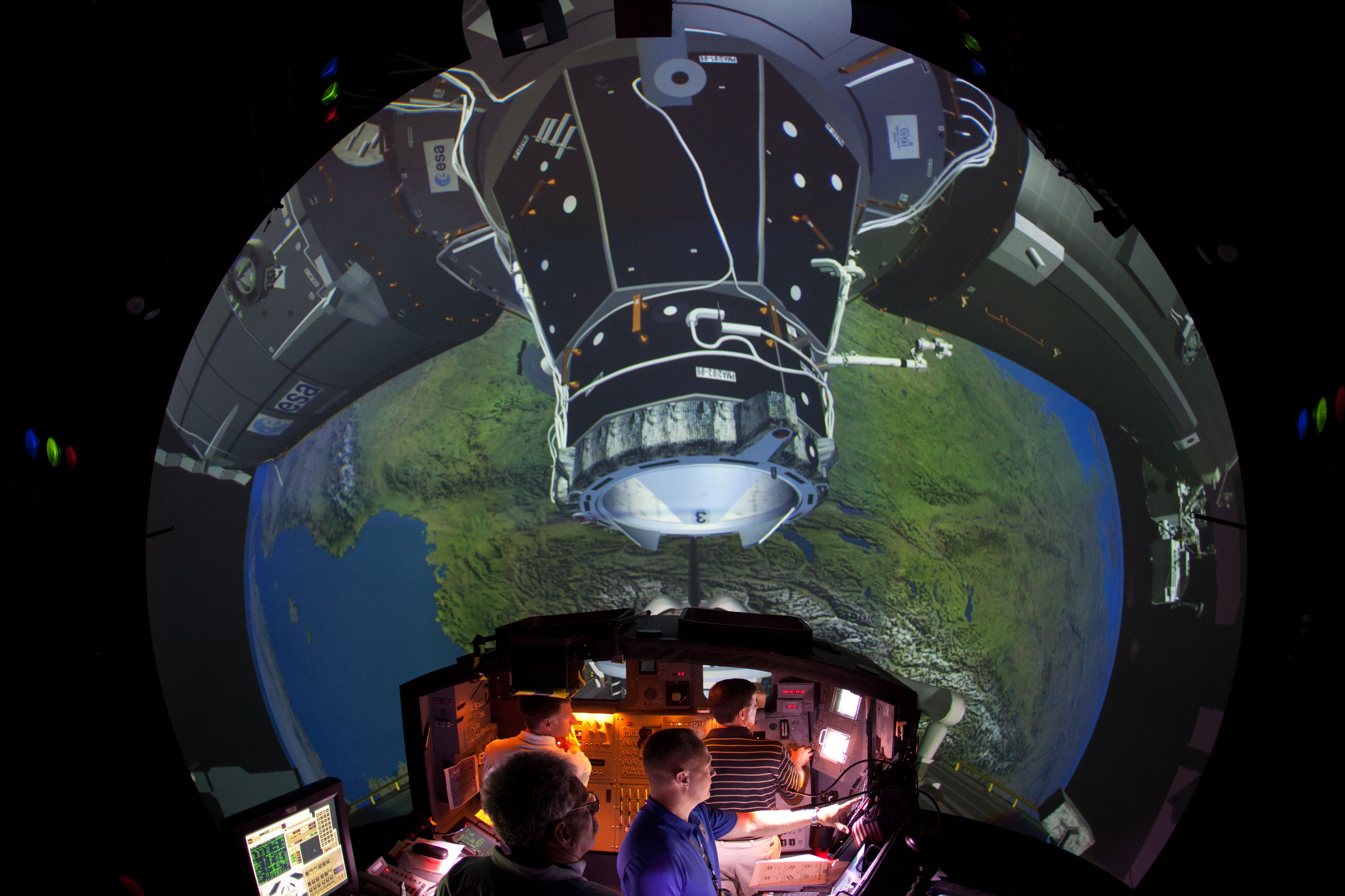
The crew of STS-135 practices rendezvous and docking with the ISS in the Systems Engineering Simulator at the Johnson Space Center on June 28, 2011, in Houston, Texas.

AsCans initially go through Basic Training, where they are trained on Soyuz, and ISS systems, flight safety and operations, as well as land and water survival. Pilot AsCans will receive training on NASA's T-38 Trainer Jet. Furthermore, because modern space exploration is done by a consortium of different countries and is a very publicly visible area, astronauts received professional and cultural training, as well as language courses (specifically in Russian).

Following completion of Basic Training candidates proceed to NASA's Advanced Training. AsCans are trained on life-sized models to get a feel of what they will be doing in space. This was done both through the use of the Shuttle Training Aircraft while it was still operational and is done through simulation mock-ups. The shuttle training aircraft was exclusively used by the commander and pilot astronauts for landing practices until the retirement of the Shuttle, while advanced simulation system facilities are used by all the candidates to learn how to work and successfully fulfill their tasks in the space environment. Simulators and EVA training facilities help candidates to best prepare for their different mission operations. In particular, vacuum chambers, parabolic flights, and neutral buoyancy facilities (NBF) allow candidates to get acclimated to the micro gravity environment, particularly for EVA. Virtual reality is also becoming increasingly used as a tool to immerse AsCans into the space environment.

The final phase is the Intensive Training. It starts about three months prior to launch, preparing candidates for their assigned mission. Flight-specific integrated simulations are designed to provide a dynamic testing ground for mission rules and flight procedures. The final Intensive Training joint crew/flight controller training is carried out in parallel with mission planning. This phase is where candidates will undergo mission specific operational training, as well as experience with their assigned experiments. Crew medical officer training is also included to effectively intervene with proactive and reactive actions in case of medical issues.

==== Notable training facilities ====
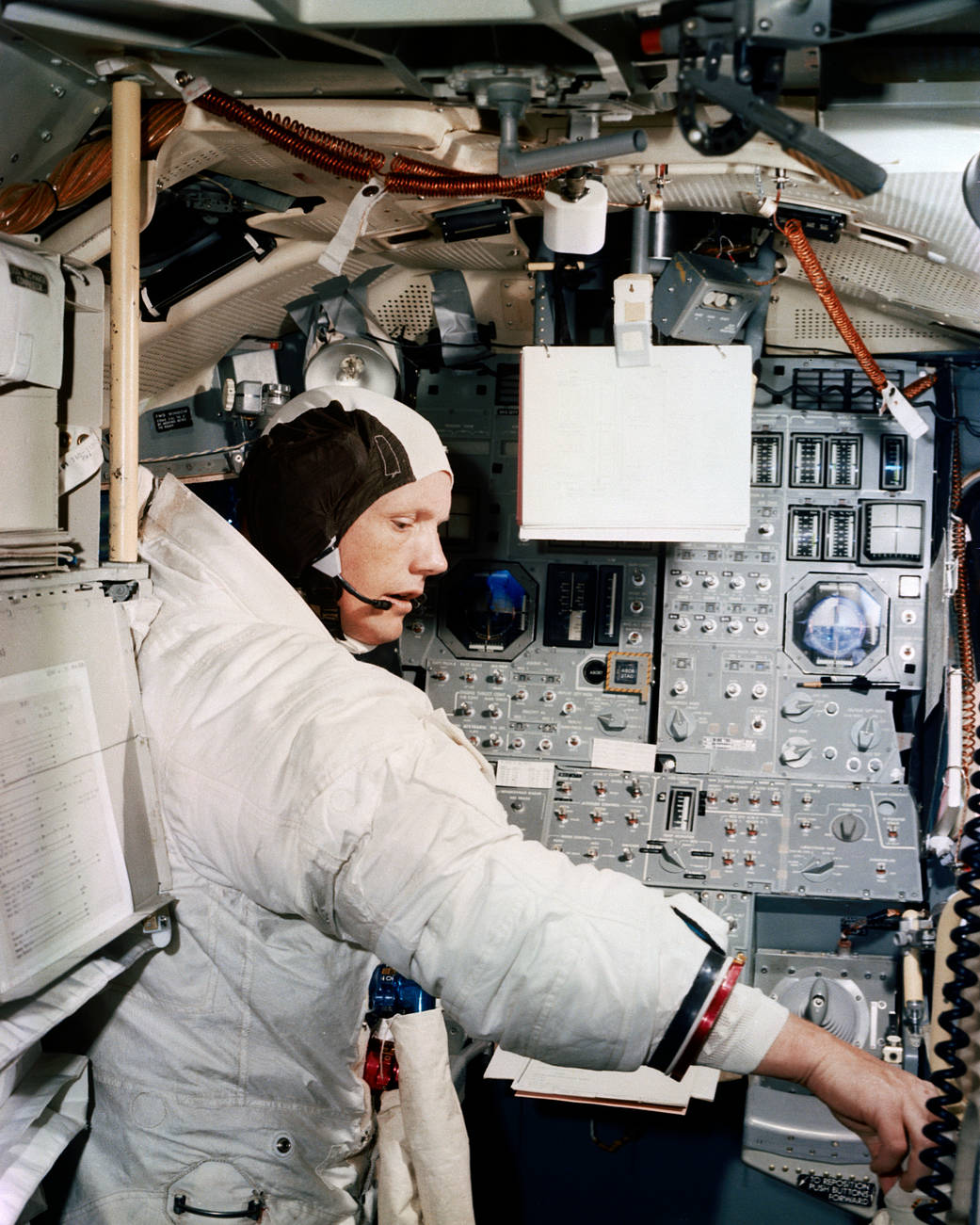
Neil Armstrong in a Lunar Module simulator prior to his journey to the Moon.

It can take up to two years for an AsCan to become formally qualified as an astronaut. Usually, the training process are completed with various training facilities available in NASA: Space training facilities try to replicate or simulate the experience of spaceflight in a spacecraft as closely and realistically as possible. This includes full-size cockpit replicas mounted on hydraulic rams and controlled by state of the art computer technology; elaborate watertanks for simulation of weightlessness; and devices used by scientists to study the physics and environment of outer space.

- Space Vehicle Mock-up Facility (SVMF): located in the Johnson Space Center in Houston, TX. The SVMF consists of life-size models of vehicles of the ISS, the Orion, and different other commercial programs. The purpose of SVMF is to provide a unique simulated experience for astronauts to get familiar with their tasks in space vehicles. Potential training projects include preparation of emergency, on-orbit intra-vehicular maintenance, and airlock operations. The facility also provides experiences for astronauts in real-time communications with the ground team for mission support.
- KC-135 Stratotanker: the KC-135 is an air-refueling plane designed by Boeing. Known as the "Weightless Wonder" or the "Vomit Comet", this plane is the most famous of its kind, which has served to simulate reduced or microgravity environments for NASA astronauts since 1994. The "roller coaster" maneuvers that the plane is capable of doing provide people as well as equipment on board about 20–25 seconds of weightlessness.
- The Precision Air-Bearing Floor (PABF): located in the Johnson Space Center in Houston, TX. Because of the microgravity environment in space, the resulting lack of friction posts difficulties for astronauts to move and stop large objects. The PABF is a "flat floor" that uses compressed air to suspend typical hardware or mock-ups that astronauts may encounter in space above the ground. It is used to simulate low-friction environments for astronauts to learn to move large objects.
- The Neutral Buoyancy Lab: (NBL): located in the Johnson Space Center in Houston, TX. Through a combination of weighting and floating effects, the NBL creates a balance between the tendencies to sink and to float, and therefore simulating the experience of weightlessness. In the NBL, several full-size models of the space vehicles are present in a large "water tank". Unlike the SVMF, the NBL helps astronauts train on projects such as maintenance, but outside of the space vehicle.

=== Europe ===
Astronaut training in Europe is carried out by the European Astronaut Centre (EAC), headquartered in Cologne, Germany. European training has three phases: Basic training, Advanced training, and Increment Specific Training.

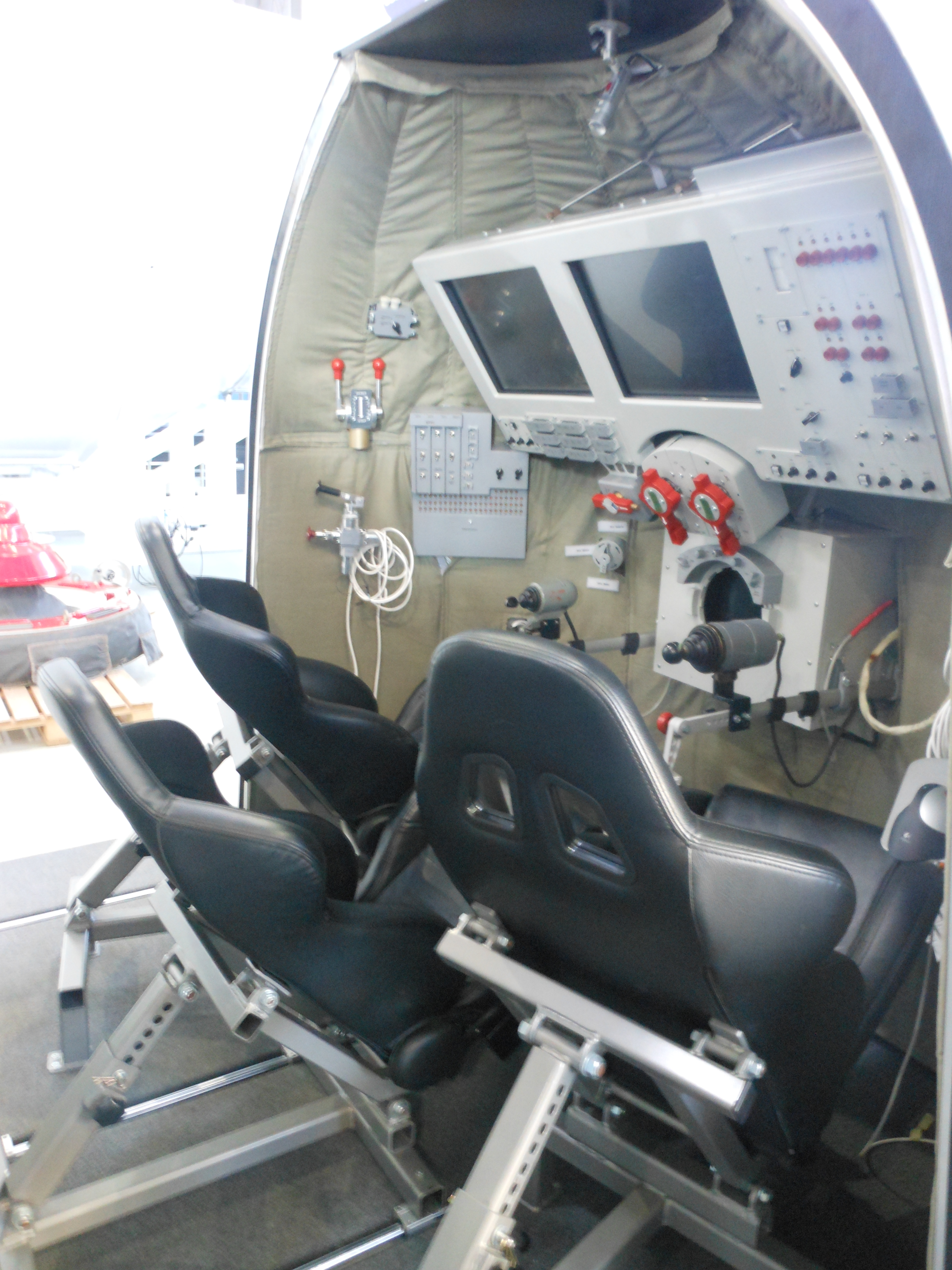
Soyuz capsule simulator located at the EAC in Cologne, Germany. ESA astronauts will simulate operations in the capsule at the EAC.

For all ESA selected astronauts, Basic Training begins at the EAC headquarters. This section of the training cycle has four separate training blocks that last 16 months. Astronauts will receive an orientation on the major spacefaring nations, their space agencies, and all major crewed and uncrewed space programs. Training in this phase also looks into applicable laws and policies of the space sector. Technical (including engineering, astrodynamics, propulsion, orbital mechanics, etc.) and scientific (including human physiology, biology, earth observation, and astronomy) basics are introduced, to ensure that all new astronauts have the required base level of knowledge. Training is done on ISS operations and facilities, including an introduction to all major operating systems on board the ISS that are required for its functionality as a crewed space research laboratory. This phase also covers in-depth systems operations for all spacecraft that service the ISS (e.g. Soyuz, Progress, Automatic Transfer Vehicle (ATV), and the H-II Transfer Vehicle (HTV)), as well as ground control and launch facility training. This training phase also focuses on skills such as robotic operations, rendezvous and docking, Russian language courses, human behavior and performance, and finally a PADI open water scuba diving course. This scuba course provides basic EVA training at ESA's NBF before moving on to the larger NASA training facility at the Lyndon B. Johnson Space Center.

Advanced Training includes a much more in-depth look into the ISS, including learning how to service and operate all systems. Enhanced science training is also implemented at this time to ensure all astronauts can perform science experiments on board the ISS. This phase takes around one year to complete and training is completed across the ISS partner network, no longer only at the EAC. It is only upon completion of this phase that astronauts are assigned to a spaceflight.

Increment-Specific Training starts only after an astronaut has been assigned to a flight. This phase lasts 18 months and prepares them for their role on their assigned mission. During this phase crew members as well as backup crews will train together. The crew tasks on the ISS are individually tailored, with consideration to the astronaut's particular experience and professional background. There are three different user levels for all on-board equipment (i.e. user level, operator level, and specialist level). A crew member can be a specialist on systems while also only being an operator or user on others, hence why the training program is individually tailored. Increment Specific Training also includes training to deal with off-nominal situations. Astronauts will also learn how to run the experiments that are specifically scheduled for their assigned missions.

=== Russia ===
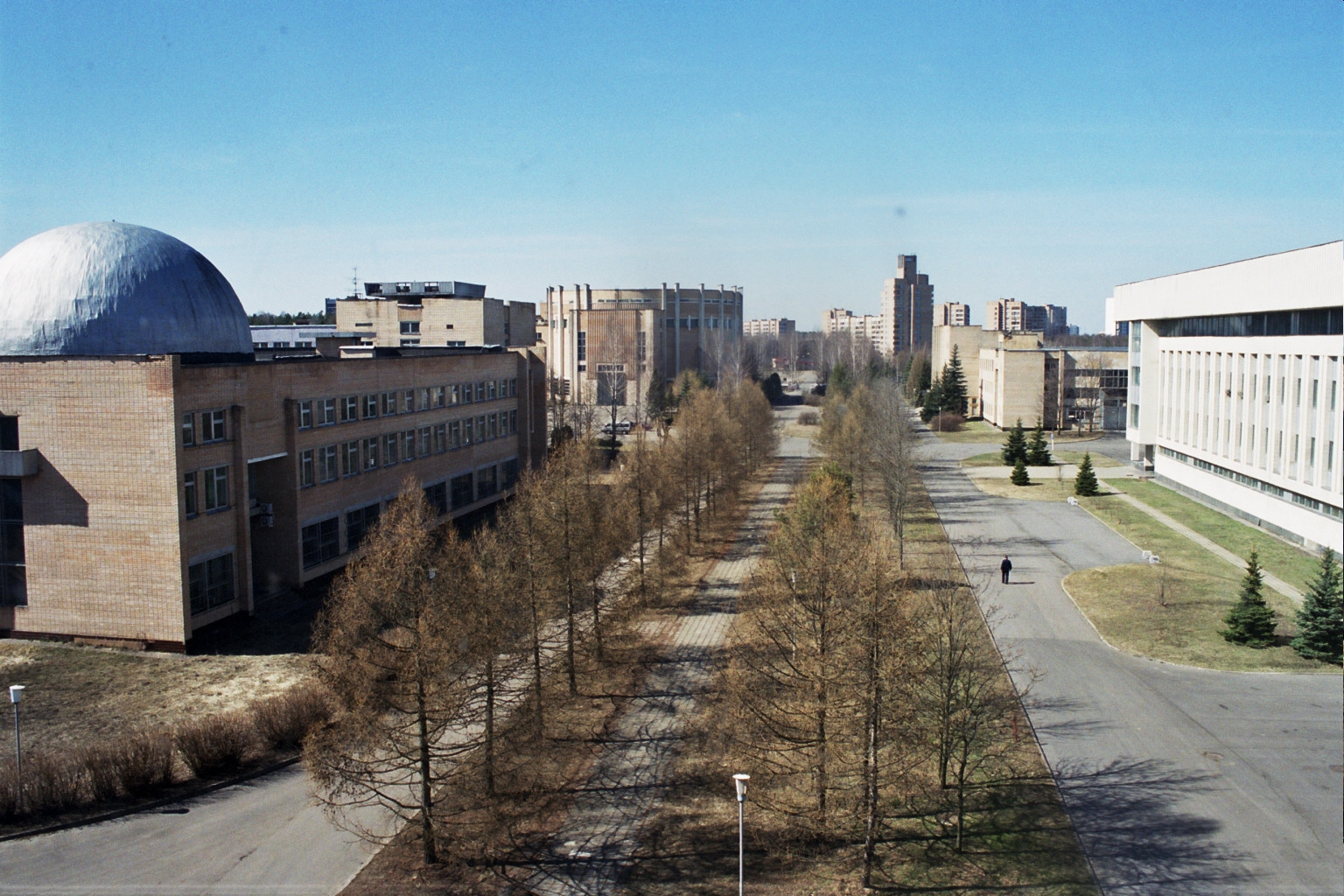
The grounds of the Gagarin Cosmonauts Training Center

Training for cosmonauts falls into three phases: General Space Training, Group Training, and Crew Training. General Space Training lasts about two years and consists of classes, survival training, and a final exam which determines whether a cosmonaut will be a test or research cosmonaut. The next year is devoted to Group Training where cosmonauts specialize in the Soyuz or ISS as well as professional skills. The final phases, the Crew Training phase, lasts a year and a half and is dedicated to detailed vehicle operations procedures, ISS training, and the English language.

Training primarily takes place at the Yuri Gagarin Cosmonaut Training Center. The center facilities have full size mockups of all major Soviet and Russian spacecraft including the ISS. As with the ISS astronauts, cosmonauts train in the US, Germany, Japan, and Canada for specific training in the various ISS modules.

=== Japan ===
The Japanese human spaceflight program has historically focused on training astronauts for Space Shuttle missions. As such, training previously took place at NASA's Lyndon B. Johnson Space Center, and followed that of NASA astronauts and other international participants in the Space Shuttle program.

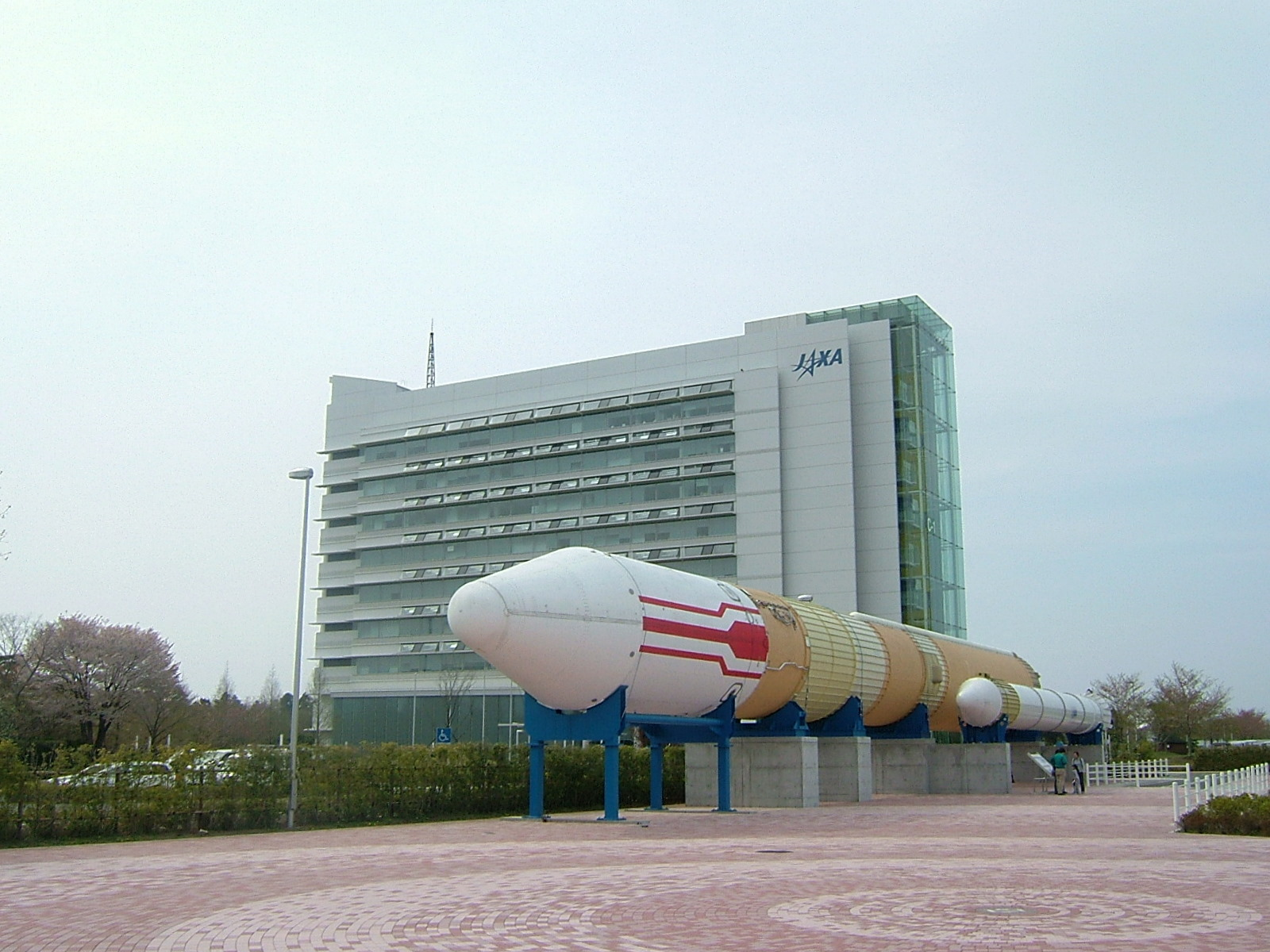
H-II rocket outside the Tsukuba Space Center where training of JAXA astronauts takes place

Since the development of domestic training facilities at the Tsukuba Space Center, training has increasingly taken place in Japan. With Japan's participation in the ISS, the training of Japanese astronauts follows a similar structure to that of other ISS partners. Astronauts carry out 1.5 years of Basic Training mainly at Tsukuba, followed by 1.5–2 years of Advanced Training at Tsukuba and ISS partner sites. Training for any international ISS astronauts involving the Kibo module will also be carried out at Tsukuba Space Center.

Advanced Training is followed by Increment-Specific Training, which, along with any Kibo training, will be carried out at Tsukuba. EVA training for Kibo takes place in the Weightless Environment Test System (WETS). WETS is a Neutral Buoyancy Facility featuring a full-scale mock-up of the Kibo module on the ISS. The Tsukuba Space Center also includes medical facilities for assessing suitability of candidates, an isolation chamber for simulating some of the mental and emotional stressors of long duration spaceflight, and a hypobaric chamber for training in hull breach or Life Support System failure scenarios resulting in a reduction or loss of air pressure.

=== China ===
Although official details of the selection process for the Shenzhou program are not available, what is known is that candidates are chosen by the Chinese National Space Administration from the Chinese air force and must be between 25 and 30 years of age, with a minimum of 800 hours flying time, and a degree-level education. Candidates must be between 160 cm and 172 cm in height, and between 50 kg and 70 kg in weight.

For China's Shenzhou astronauts, training begins with a year-long program of education in the basics of spaceflight. During this period, candidates are also introduced to human physiology and psychology. The second phase of training, lasting nearly 3 years involves extensive training in piloting the Shenzhou vehicle in nominal and emergency modes. The third and final stage of training is mission specific training, and lasts approximately 10 months. During this phase of training, astronauts are trained in the high fidelity Shenzhou trainer, as well as the Neutral Buoyancy Facility located at the Astronaut Center of China (ACC), in Beijing. As well as time spent in the Neutral Buoyancy Facility (NBF), training for EVA takes place in a high vacuum, low temperature chamber that simulates the environmental conditions of space. At all stages of training, astronauts undergo physical conditioning, including time in a human centrifuge located at the ACC, and a program of micro gravity flights, carried out in Russia.

=== India ===
The Indian human space flight program still awaits a formal go ahead. Once cleared, the mission is expected to take two Indians in a Soyuz-type orbital vehicle into low Earth orbit. The training for these astronauts should be based on the lessons learned from training India's only Cosmonaut Wing Commander Rakesh Sharma (See Salyut-7 1984) and through India's international co-operation with NASA and Roscosmos. India may proceed with its human spaceflight program on its own, which would require the Indian Space Research Organisation (ISRO) to develop its own training program. India plans to build an astronaut training facility and biomedical engineering centre 8 to 10 kilometres from Kempegowda International Airport. This facility will be used for future astronaut training, as training for India's first crewed mission will take place in the US or in Russia. The Kempegowda centre will have chambers for radiation regulation, thermal cycling and centrifugal acceleration training.

== Future training ==
=== Long-duration missions to the Moon or Mars ===
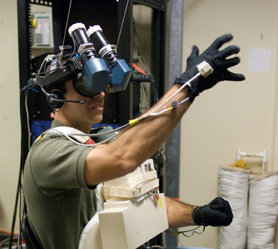
Astronaut during virtual reality training

Astronauts for long-term missions–such as those to the Moon or Mars–need to carry out multiple tasks and duties, because on such missions the astronauts will need to function largely autonomously, and will need to be proficient in many different areas. For these types of missions, the training to prepare astronauts will likely include training as doctors, scientists, engineers, technicians, pilots, and geologists. In addition there will be a focus on the psychological aspects of long-duration missions where crew is largely isolated.

Currently a six-month mission to the ISS requires up to five years of astronaut training. This level of training is to be expected and likely to be expanded upon for future space exploration missions. It may also include in-flight training aspects. It may be possible that the ISS will be used as a long-duration astronaut training facility in the future.

A tool for astronaut training will be the continuing use of analog environments, including NASA Extreme Environment Mission Operations (NOAA NEEMO), NASA's Desert Research and Technology Studies (Desert RATS), Envihab (planned), Flight Analog Research Unit, Haughton-Mars Project, or even the ISS (in-flight).

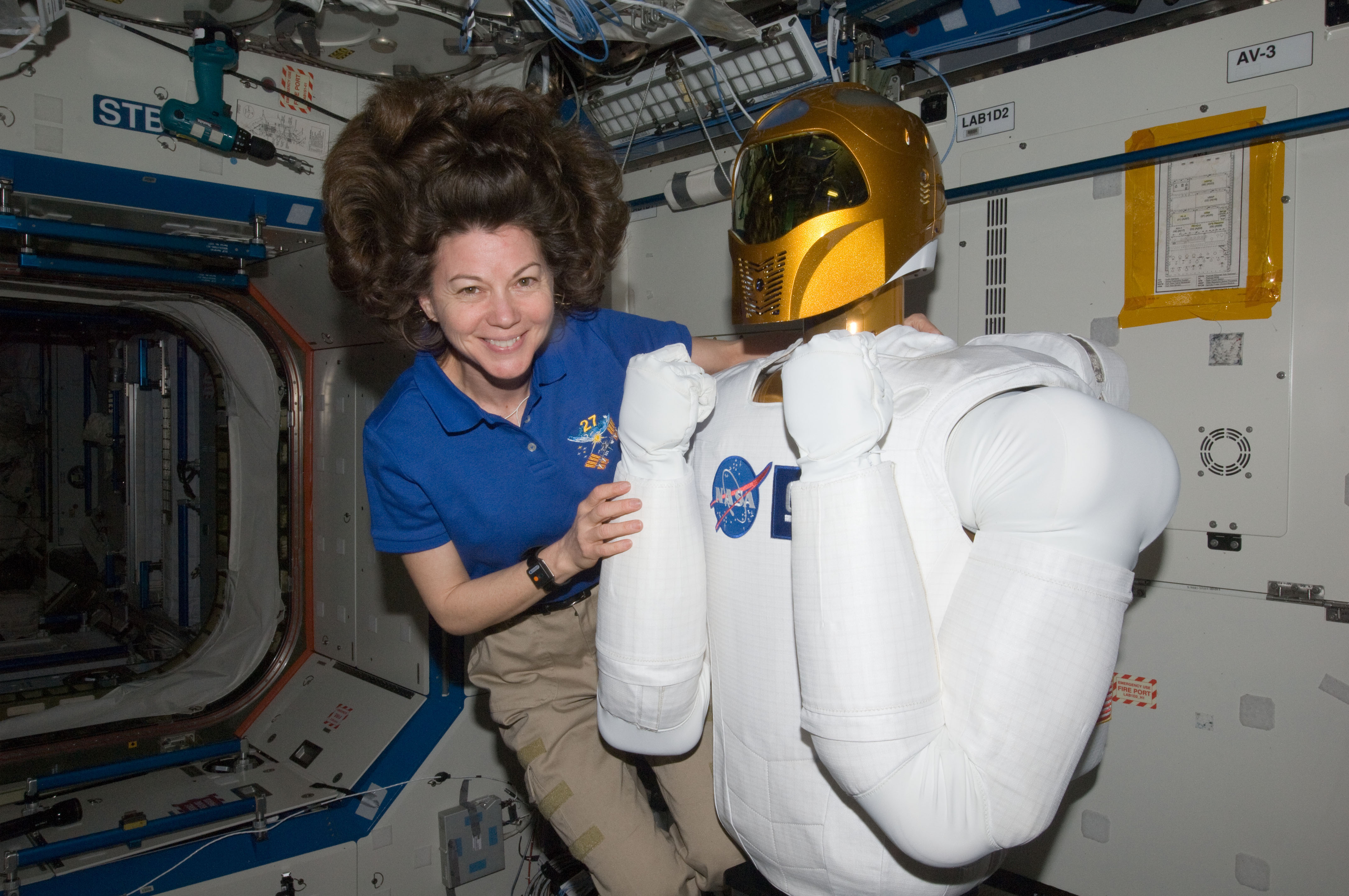
Robonaut2 onboard ISS

Human-Robot Interaction is expected to play a large role in long-duration missions. Robots assistants and extreme environment explorers free astronauts from mundane tasks and protects them from unnecessary risks. Between 2011 and 2018 the humanoid Robonaut 2 was tested on the ISS.

Training also has to be evolved for future Moon landings to a human mission to Mars. Factors like crew dynamics, crew size, and crew activities play a crucial role as these missions would last from one year to Moon to three years on Mars. The training required for such missions has to be versatile, intercultural and easy to learn, adapt, and improvise.

A journey to Mars will require astronauts to remain in the crew capsule for nine months. The monotony and isolation of the journey present psychological challenges. The long period spent in the crew capsule is comparable to other forms of solitary confinement, such as in submarines or Antarctic bases. Being in an isolated and confined environment generates stress, interpersonal conflict, and other behavioral and mental problems.

Researchers are looking into how existing mental health tools can be adjusted to help the crew face stressors that will arise in an isolated, confined environment (ICE) during extended missions. The International Space Station uses a behavioral conflict management system known as the Virtual Space Station (VSS) to minimize conflict between crew members and address psychological challenges. The program has modules that focus on relationship management, stress and depression that guide astronaut's through a virtual therapy session in space.

== Virtual reality astronaut training ==
=== History ===
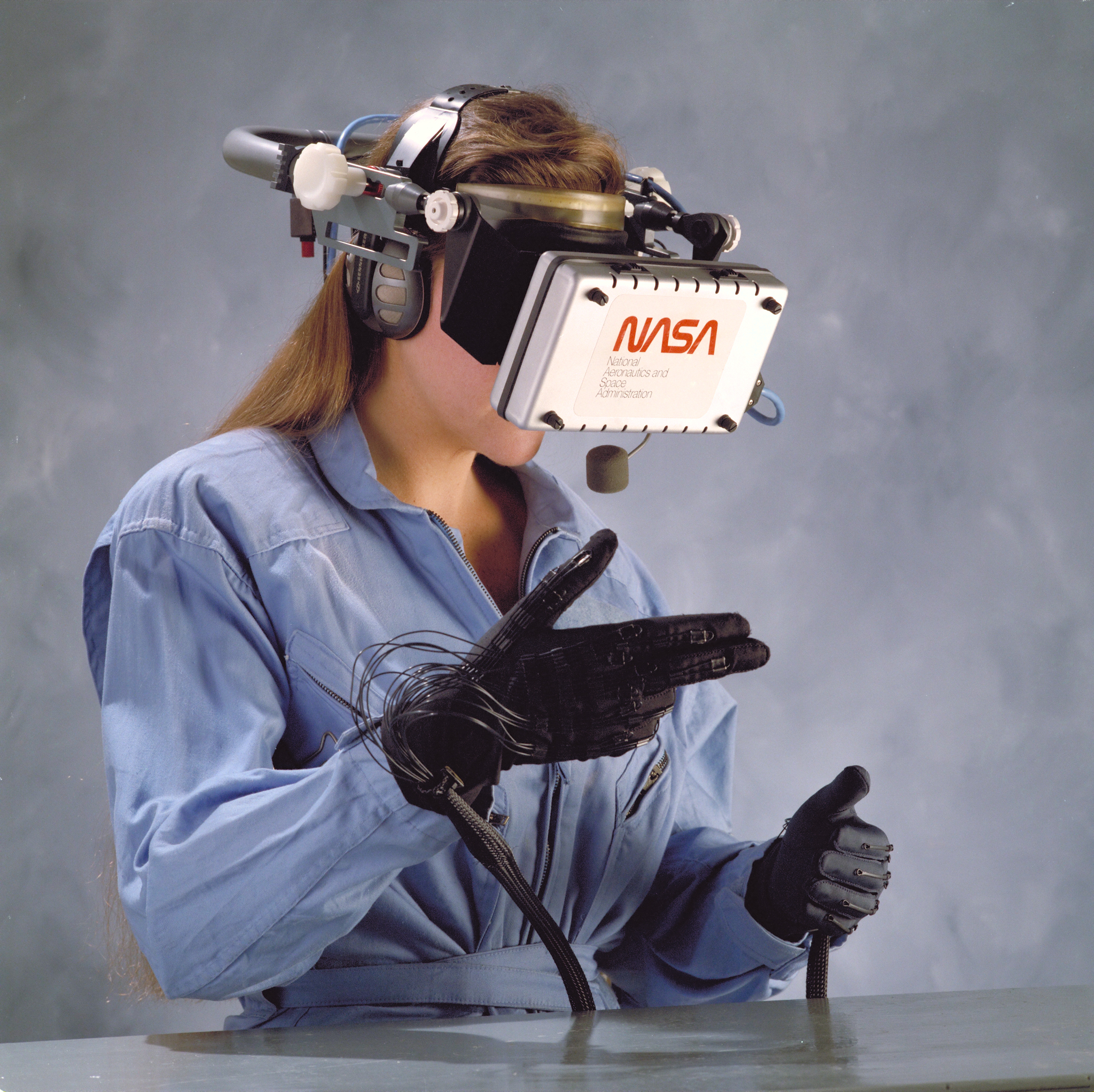
An early 1990s virtual reality headset and gloves used by NASA

Virtual reality technologies first came to a commercial release in the 1990s. It is not until then did people realize that VR can be used in training astronauts. The earlier VR gears for astronaut training are dedicated to enhance the communication between robot arm operators and the astronaut during Extravehicular Activities (EVA). It brings EVA crew members and robot arm operators together, in live, even when they are on board a spacecraft. It is also used to replace some of the oversized models that cannot fit in the Neutral Buoyancy Lab (NBL).

In 1993, astronauts were trained and evaluated on working on the Hubble Space Telescope through a virtual reality training tool, Research in Human Factors Aspects of Enhanced Virtual Environments for EVA Training and Simulation (RAVEN). However, the aim of RAVEN was not to train astronauts but to evaluate the efficacy of training using virtual reality versus underwater and other setup.

Virtual reality can be used for mission planning, cooperative and interactive designing, and engineering problem-solving, among other use cases.

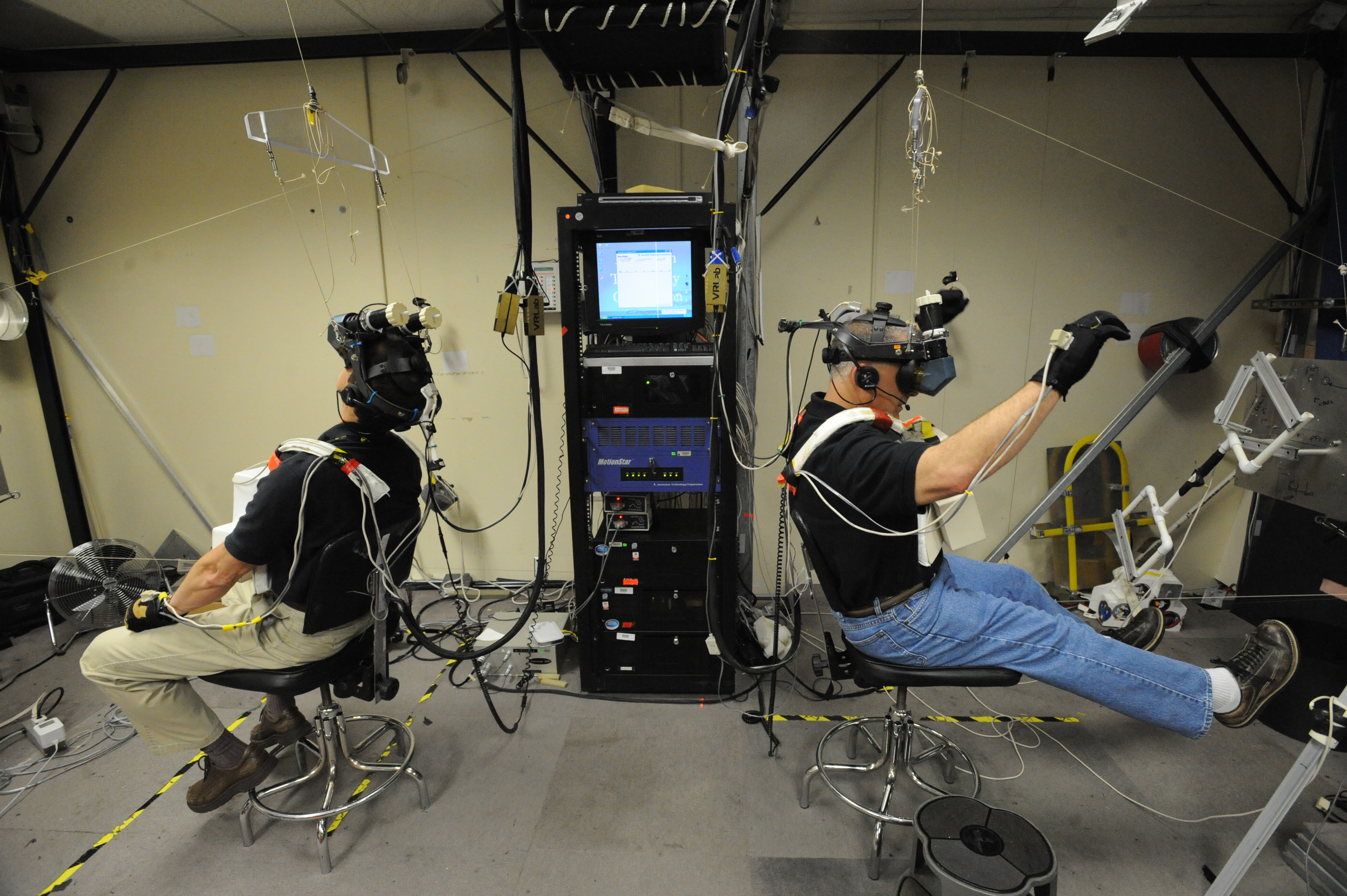
Astronauts Tom Marshburn, left, and Dave Wolf train for a spacewalk in the Integrated EVA-RMS Virtual Reality Simulator Facility at Johnson Space Center

=== Current virtual reality training ===
While the extravehicular activities (EVAs) training facility can simulate the space conditions, including pressure and lighting, the Micro-g environment cannot be fully reconstructed in the Earth's 1-G environment. Virtual reality is utilized during EVA training to increase the immersion of the training process. NASA Johnson Space Center has facilities such as the Space Vehicle Mockup Facility (SVMF), Virtual Reality Laboratory (VRL), and Neutral Buoyancy Laboratory (NBL).

The SVMF uses the Partial Gravity Simulator (PGS) and air bearing floor (PABF) to simulate the zero-gravity and the effects of Newton's laws of motion. Similar training systems originated from the Apollo and Gemini training. Virtual reality enhances an astronaut's senses during training modules like fluid quick disconnect operations, spacewalks, and the orbiter's Space Shuttle thermal protection system (TPS) repairs.

NASA Virtual Reality Laboratory utilizes virtual reality to supplement the Simplified Aid For EVA Rescue (SAFER) as simplified aid. The VR training offers a graphical 3-dimensional simulation of the International Space Station (ISS) with a headset, haptic feedback gloves, and motion tracker. In 2018, two Expedition 55 astronauts Richard R. Arnold and Andrew J. Feustel, received virtual reality training and performed the 210th spacewalk. The Virtual Reality Laboratory offers astronauts an immersive VR experience for spacewalks before launching into space. The training process combines a graphical rendering program that replicates the ISS and a device called the Charlotte Robot that allows astronauts to visually explore their surroundings while interacting with an object. The Charlotte robot is a simple device with a metal arm attached to the side that allows a user to interact with the device. The user wears haptic feedback gloves with force sensors that send signals to a central computer. In response, the central computer maneuvers the device using a web of cables and calculates how it would act in space through physics. While objects are weightless in space, an astronaut has to be familiar with an object's forces of inertia and understand how the object will respond to simple motions to avoid losing it in space. Training can be completed individually or with a partner. This allows astronauts to learn how to interact with mass and moments of inertia in a microgravity environment.

The Neutral Buoyancy Laboratory (NBL) has advantages in simulating a zero-gravity environment and reproducing the sensation of floating in space. The training method is achieved by constructing a low gravity environment through Maintaining the Natural buoyancy in one of the largest pools in the world. The NBL pool used to practice extravehicular activities or spacewalks is 62 meters (203 feet) long, 31 meters (102 feet) wide, and 12 meters (39 feet) deep, with a capacity of 6.2 million gallons. Underwater head-mounted display virtual reality headset is used to provide visual information during the training with a frame rate of 60 fps and screen resolution of 1280 by 1440. The underwater VR training system has a reduced training cost because of the accessibility of the VR applications, and astronauts need less time to complete the assigned practice task.

Despite the NASA training modules, commercial spaceflight training also uses virtual reality technology to improve their training systems. Boeing's virtual reality team develops a training system for Boeing Starliner to train astronauts to transport between the Earth and the ISS. The VR training system can simulate high-speed situations and emergency scenarios, for instance, launching, entering the space, and landing at an unexpected location.

=== Advantages of virtual reality training ===
Visual reorientation is a phenomenon that happens when the perception of an object changes because of the changing visual field and cues. This illusion will alter the astronaut's perception of the orienting force of gravity and then lose spatial direction. The astronauts must develop good spatial awareness and orientation to overcome visual reorientation. In the traditional disorientation training, for instance, the Yuri Gagarin Cosmonaut Training Center trains the astronaut by simulating a microgravity environment through a centrifuge. In contrast, VR training requires less gear, training the astronauts more economically.

Virtual reality training utilizes the mix-realistic interaction devices, such as cockpits in flight simulators can reduce the simulation sickness and increase user movement. Compared to traditional training, VR training performs better to minimize the effects of space motion sickness and spatial disorientation. Astronauts who received VR training can perform the task 12% faster, with a 53% decrease in nausea symptoms.

While VR is used in astronaut training on the ground, immersive technology also contributes to on-orbit training. VR head-mounted display can help the astronaut maintain physical well-being as part of proficiency maintenance training. Moreover, VR systems are used to ensure the mental health of the crewmembers. The simulations of social scenarios can mitigate the stress and establish the connectedness under the isolated and confined environment (ICE).

Virtual reality acclimates astronauts to environments in space such as the International Space Station before leaving earth. While astronauts can familiarize themselves with the ISS during training in the NBL, they are only able to see certain sections of the station. While it prepares astronauts for the tasks they are performing in space, it does not necessarily give them a full spatial understanding of the station's layout. That's where Virtual Reality plays an important role. The Virtual Reality Lab uses a system known as the Dynamic Onboard Ubiquitous Graphics program (DOUG) to model the ISS's exterior including decals, fluid lines, and electrical lines, so that the crew can acclimate to their new environment. The level of detail goes beyond the exterior of the station. When a user enters space, they see pure black until their pupil's dilate and the sky fills with stars in an occurrence called the 'blooming effect'.

=== Disadvantages of virtual reality training ===
While virtual reality prepares astronauts for the unfamiliar tasks they will face in outer space, the training is unable to replicate the psychological and emotional stress that astronauts face on a daily basis. This is because virtual tasks do not hold the same repercussions as the real task and the technology does not produce strong psychological effects, like claustrophobia, that often occurs in enclosed environments.

Stimulating a virtual microgravity environment can be costly due to additional equipment requirements. Unlike commercialized virtual reality, the equipment that NASA uses cannot be produced at a large scale because the systems require supplemental technology. Several VR programs work in combination with the Neutral Buoyancy Lab or the Charlotte Robot in the Virtual Reality Lab which requires expensive facilities and does not eliminate the travel component that VR can minimize. NASA's Charlotte robot is restricted by cables that simulate the microgravity environment and the Virtual Reality Lab only has two machines in their possession. This particular training system requires a virtual glovebox system (GVX) that has been incorporated into training at NASA and the EVA virtual system at the Astronaut Center of China. Using sensors embedded in the fabric, the gloves can sense when the wearer decides to grasp an object or release it, but the technology needs to be further developed to integrate precise user movements into virtual programs. These gloves have been reported to be uncomfortable and only capture limited movements. Full-body motion sensors have also been incorporated into training and tend to be expensive but necessary in order to have effective tactile feedback in response to the astronauts' movements. While virtual reality programs have been developed that do not require full-body sensors, the absence reduces the degree to which a user can interact with the virtual world.

=== Future ===
The primary focus of future research on virtual reality technologies in space exploration is to develop a method of simulating a microgravity environment. Although it has been a goal since the beginning of VR being used in astronaut training, minor progress has been made. The current setup uses a bungee rope attached to a person's feet, a swing attached to the body, and finally a head mounted VR display. However, from participants in experiments that use this setup to simulate reduced gravity environments, they only experience the feel of moving around in space with the help of VR, but the experience does not resemble a real zero-gravity environment in outer space. Specifically, the pressure from the bungee rope and the swing because of the participants' own weight creates an unreal and unpleasant feeling. The current technology may be enough for the general public to experience what moving around in space is like, but it is still far from being formally used as an astronaut training tool.

These efforts of simulating micro-gravity serve a similar purpose of creating an increasingly immersive environment for astronaut training.

== See also ==
- Effect of spaceflight on the human body
- Human analog missions
- Human spaceflight
- Apollo program training
- Mercury Seven
- NASA Astronaut Corps
- Space medicine
- The Astronaut Monument
