= Space Nation =

Finnish/US company

- Formerly: Cohu Experience Oy (2013–2017)
- Type: Private
- Industry: Space Tourism, Media
- Founded: March 2013; 13 years ago
- Founders: Kalle Vähä-Jaakkola; Mazdak Nassir; Miksu Vaittinen
- Headquarters: Midland, Texas USA
- Key people: Kalle Vähä-Jaakkola ( CEO); Masdak Nassir ( CCO); Hjörtur Smárason (Chief Communications Officer); Morgan Kainu (Mission Development Director); Peter Vesterbacka ("Ambassador", Advisor)
- Products: Simulated training, Experiential Learning, website, Expeditions
- Services: Commercial Astronaut Training; Personal Development; Professional Development
- Number of employees: 5
- Website: https://spacenation.org/

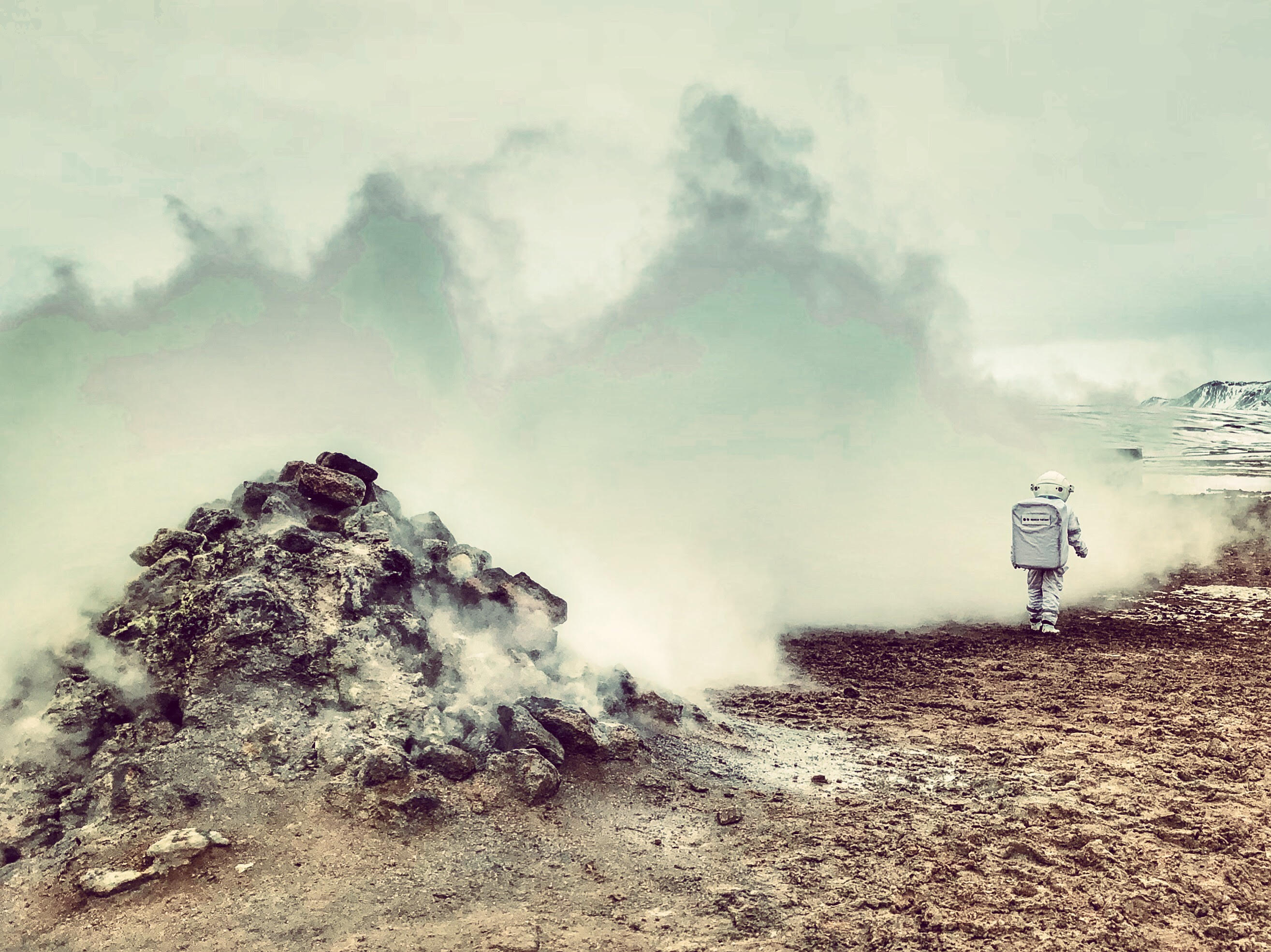
Fictional "Space Nation Astronaut" in North East Iceland (promotional image)

== Introduction ==
Space Nation is a privately held Finnish/US space exploration training company that develops immersive mission experiences modeled on astronaut training and mission operations. Originally established in Finland and later restructured in the United States, the organization develops immersive, simulated space mission programs modeled on astronaut training and operational spaceflight environments. Space Nation has built up partnerships with companies in the space industry in the US, Europe, South America, and China. It is the first space tourism company to join the United Nations World Tourism Organization (UNWTO) as an affiliate member.

Its programs combine experiential learning, team-based mission scenarios, and astronaut-guided instruction for individuals, professionals, and organizations interested in space exploration and high-performance teamwork.

The company operates both in-person mission simulations and digital community-based programming, positioning itself within the commercial space training and space-inspired experiential education sector.

== History ==
=== Founding and Early Development (2013-2018) ===
Space Nation was co-founded in 2013 by Mazdak Nassir and Kalle Vähä-Jaakkola in Finland. The organization was established with the stated mission of broadening access to space-related education and astronaut-style training experiences beyond government astronaut corps.

During its early years, Space Nation focused on developing a mobile-based astronaut training application designed to simulate elements of astronaut preparation and build a global community of space enthusiasts.

In April 2018 Space Nation launched a game app for mobile phones, the Space Nation Navigator, which the company calls an astronaut training app. It was developed in partnership with NASA astronaut trainers and includes mini games, quizzes, challenges and a narrative adventure. The app was announced as the first step in the "Space Nation Astronaut Program". Space Nation promised to choose one hundred app users for a real-life training camp where twelve of those Candidates would continue to a 10-week astronaut training program. The best performing candidate would become a "Space Nation Astronaut" and get a free trip to space. The company arranged a first "training experience" for social media influencers in May 2018 in North East Iceland in an area where the NASA astronauts trained for the Apollo program before going to the Moon in 1967.

The company did not announce the carrier for the supposed space flight. As of November 2018, all possible carriers have not yet started with regular commercial space tourism.

In August 2018, Space Nation announced it had "encountered financial difficulties" and put the "Space Nation Astronaut Program" on an indefinite hold. On November 16, 2018, Space Nation's CEO informed investors and crowdfunders, that the company is filing for bankruptcy.

=== Transition to the United States (2019-Present) ===
In 2019, Space Nation was reimagined and expanded its operations to the United States, establishing headquarters in Midland, Texas. The move marked a shift toward immersive, in-person mission simulations and structured experiential programs.

The company reoriented its model to include multi-day simulated missions designed to replicate aspects of space operations, team dynamics, and mission control coordination. This transition reflected a broader industry trend toward commercial space education, analog mission environments, and civilian-accessible astronaut-style training experiences.

== Training Programs ==
=== Simulated Mission Program ===
Space Nation designs and conducts scenario-based mission simulations intended to replicate operational elements of human spaceflight. These programs typically include structured mission timelines, defined crew roles, mission control coordination, and simulated surface or exploration tasks. Each of their programs are designed to integrate elements of astronaut-style discipline, leadership under pressure, and collaborative systems thinking.

==== Moon Pioneers Mission (MPM) ====
The company’s flagship program is the Moon Pioneer Mission (MPM), a multi-day immersive training experience centered on simulated lunar exploration in Midland, Texas. Participants are assigned specific crew roles and are tasked with completing a series of coordinated objectives under simulated time and resource constraints. Scenarios may include exploration planning, habitat logistics, communication exercises, and simulated extravehicular activities. The program also incorporates structured debriefs and performance reviews to reinforce operational concepts and collaborative decision-making skills.

The Moon Pioneers Mission reflects broader interest in experiential spaceflight training and civilian engagement in space exploration concepts. Although the simulation is not an accredited astronaut training course overseen by a national space agency, it draws on operational principles used in professional spaceflight preparation and simulated mission environments. The mission is designed to promote teamwork, systems thinking, and resilience within a low-fidelity simulated environment that emphasizes real-time decision making.

Since its inception, the Moon Pioneers Mission has been offered to individual participants, corporate groups, and educational cohorts seeking space-inspired immersive experiences. The program is part of Space Nation’s broader suite of mission simulations that aim to provide practical exposure to the procedural and operational aspects of space exploration.

==== Lunar Rescue Mission (LRM) ====
In 2026, Space Nation plans to pilot a new program called the Lunar Rescue Mission (LRM), scheduled for an initial mission in April 2026. The project is designed as an immersive simulated exercise that focuses on emergency response and extraterrestrial search-and-rescue scenarios in a lunar context. The Lunar Rescue Mission is being developed in collaboration with industry experts in search and rescue operations, including professionals with backgrounds in national emergency management and disaster response, such as those with experience in federal search and rescue frameworks. These collaborators bring practical expertise in coordinated rescue strategies, incident command systems, and multi-agency response methodologies, which are integrated into the simulation’s design to mirror the procedural challenges of responding to critical events in extreme environments.

The Lunar Rescue Mission concept reflects broader interest in how search and rescue capabilities might evolve for future human missions beyond Earth orbit, particularly as lunar exploration activity increases. Studies and international discussions have highlighted the emerging need for search and rescue frameworks tailored to spaceflight and lunar surface operations, given unique operational constraints and the absence of formalized rescue infrastructure beyond Earth’s orbit.

=== Astronaut-Inspired Training Framework ===
Space Nation’s training model is conceptually informed by established astronaut preparation methodologies and mission operations practices used in human spaceflight programs. The framework emphasizes role-defined, cross-functional teamwork within a structured chain of command, reflecting operational architectures commonly used in crewed missions. Simulations incorporate standardized communication protocols, task prioritization under time constraints, and coordinated interaction between field teams and mission control functions. Participants engage in scenario-based exercises designed to model decision-making in high-pressure, resource-constrained environments. These exercises often require real-time problem identification, systems-level analysis, contingency planning, and iterative feedback through formalized debrief processes. The training structure also integrates elements of operational discipline, situational awareness, and cognitive resilience, drawing from widely recognized principles in aerospace human factors and mission readiness preparation.

Although the organization is not affiliated with or accredited by national space agencies, its simulation architecture adapts operational concepts commonly associated with professional spaceflight preparation—such as mission timelines, defined crew roles, procedural adherence, and post-mission review cycles—for use in immersive civilian training environments.

== Community and Digital Engagement ==
Beyond its in-person mission simulations, Space Nation has maintained digital community initiatives that include virtual training challenges, webinars, and collaborative learning environments. Earlier programming included a digital “Spaceport” platform designed to engage participants in remote astronaut-style exercises and educational modules.

These initiatives aim to broaden participation in space-related learning experiences and build a global community of individuals interested in space exploration.

== Organizational Structure ==
Space Nation operates as a privately held company with its primary location for operations in Midland, Texas. Its leadership team includes executive management, mission development staff, and advisors with experience in space-related disciplines and operations. The organization collaborates with guest instructors and subject matter experts for components of its training programs.

== Industry Context ==
Space Nation operates within a broader ecosystem of commercial space education, simulated space training environments, and experiential leadership development programs. Its offerings reflect a growing interest in civilian-accessible space training experiences and immersive simulations modeled on extreme operational environments.

The company’s mission-based programs align with trends in experiential education that use simulated high-stakes environments to cultivate teamwork, resilience, and operational awareness.

== Crowdfunding campaign ==
Under its former name, Cohu Experience Oy, Space Nation had run a successful crowdfunding-campaign in early 2017, which broke Finland's crowdfunding record at that time. The campaign raised more than 3,2 million Euro, the first million of which in only 43 minutes. The company had predicted a profit of 84 million Euro until May 2018, 347 million Euro in 2018–2019, and a 119-fold rise in valuation to 5 billion Euro in 2019.

== Media ==
Space Nation launched a lifestyle website in October 2017 called Space Nation Orbit. The company had plans for a TV show around the physical training camp to take place in early 2019. Further plans included "Space Nation Experience Parks", the first one potentially being in China.

Space Nation owns "an office" on board the International Space Station (ISS), which is a 50x50x30 cm box. The company is a NASA Space Act Agreement signatory. NASA announced that it has provided free content for the app through a Space Act Agreement.

== See also ==
- Moon Pioneers Mission (MPM)
- Lunar Rescue Mission (LRM)
- Commercial spaceflight
- Experiential learning
- Leadership development training
