= Space Vehicle Mockup Facility =

Space training complex and museum

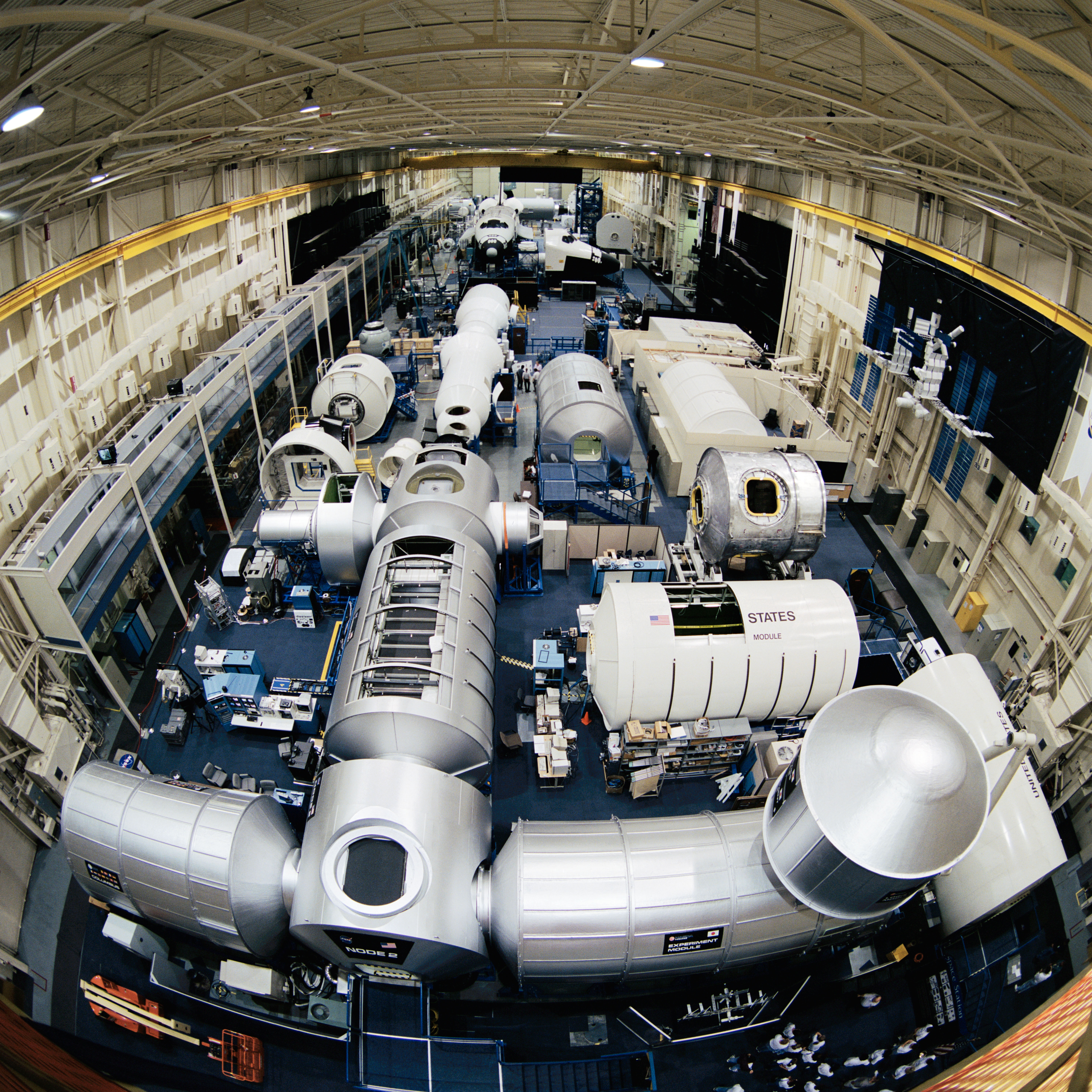
- A wide angle panorama of the ISS mock-up area
- Built: 1967
- Location: Building 9 at the Johnson Space Center; Johnson Space Center
- Coordinates: 29°33′37″N 95°05′16″W
- Industry: Astronaut training
- Employees: 1100+
- Buildings: 1
- Area: 42,500 m^{2} (457,000 sq ft)
- Owner: NASA

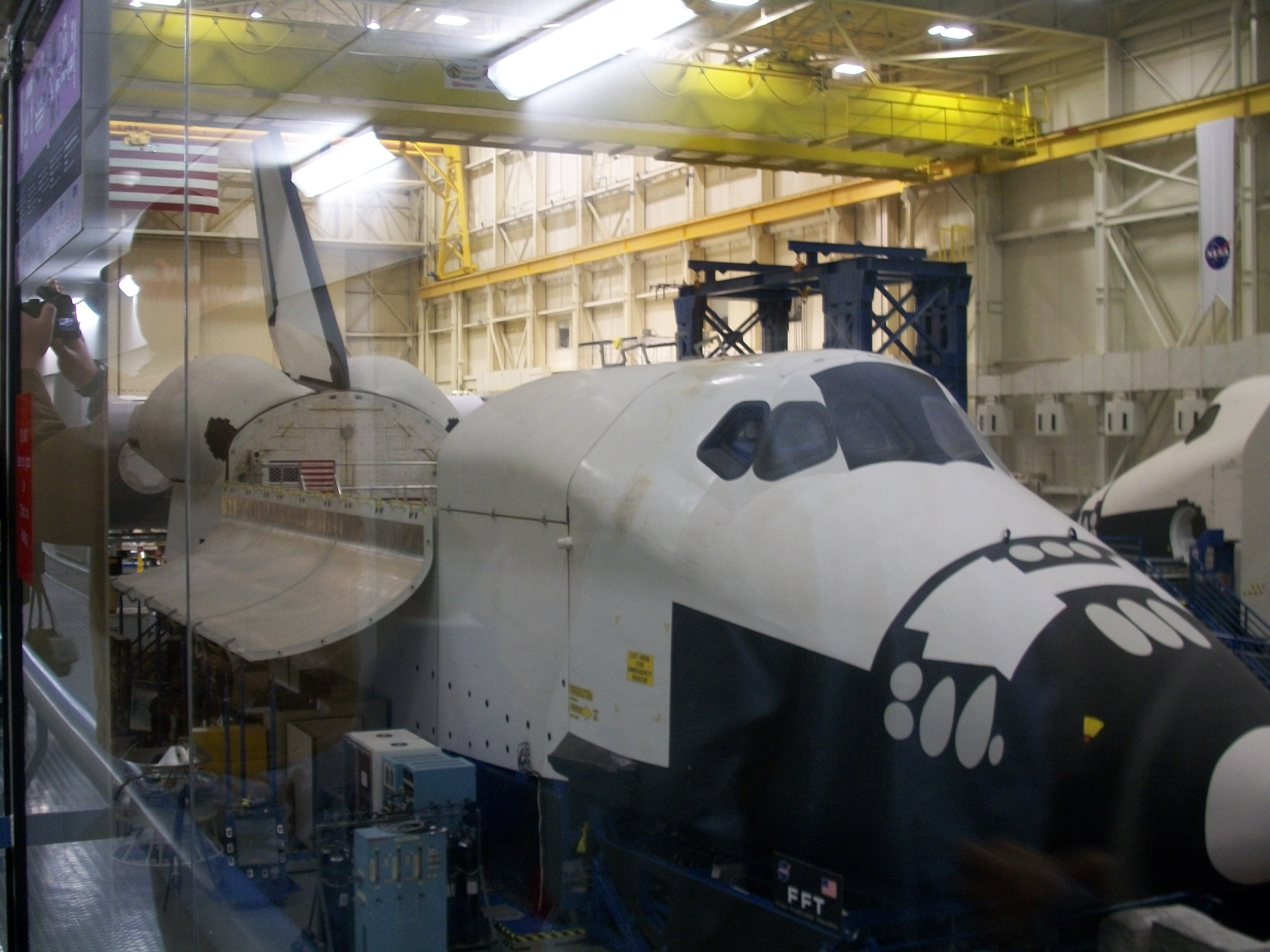
The Full Fuselage Trainer of the Orbiter Space Shuttle in the SVMF

The Space Vehicle Mockup Facility (SVMF) is a large open space area located inside Building 9 of Johnson Space Center in Houston. The SVMF houses mockups of most pressurized modules on the International Space Station (ISS). It is primarily used for astronaut training and systems familiarization.

The ISS mockups found in the SVMF are 1:1 scale, and vary in level of fidelity compared to the ISS. An industrial door at the North End, and overhead cranes allows the installation of new mockup spacecraft to be loaded into the facility. Space Center Houston offers a Level 9 VIP tour of the entire training facility during its afternoon tour. Ticket cost is $199..

== Previous trainers ==
=== Space Shuttle Orbiter Trainers ===
- Full Fuselage Trainer (FFT)
- Crew Compartment Trainer (CCT)
- Crew Compartment Trainer II (CCT II)

== Current trainers ==
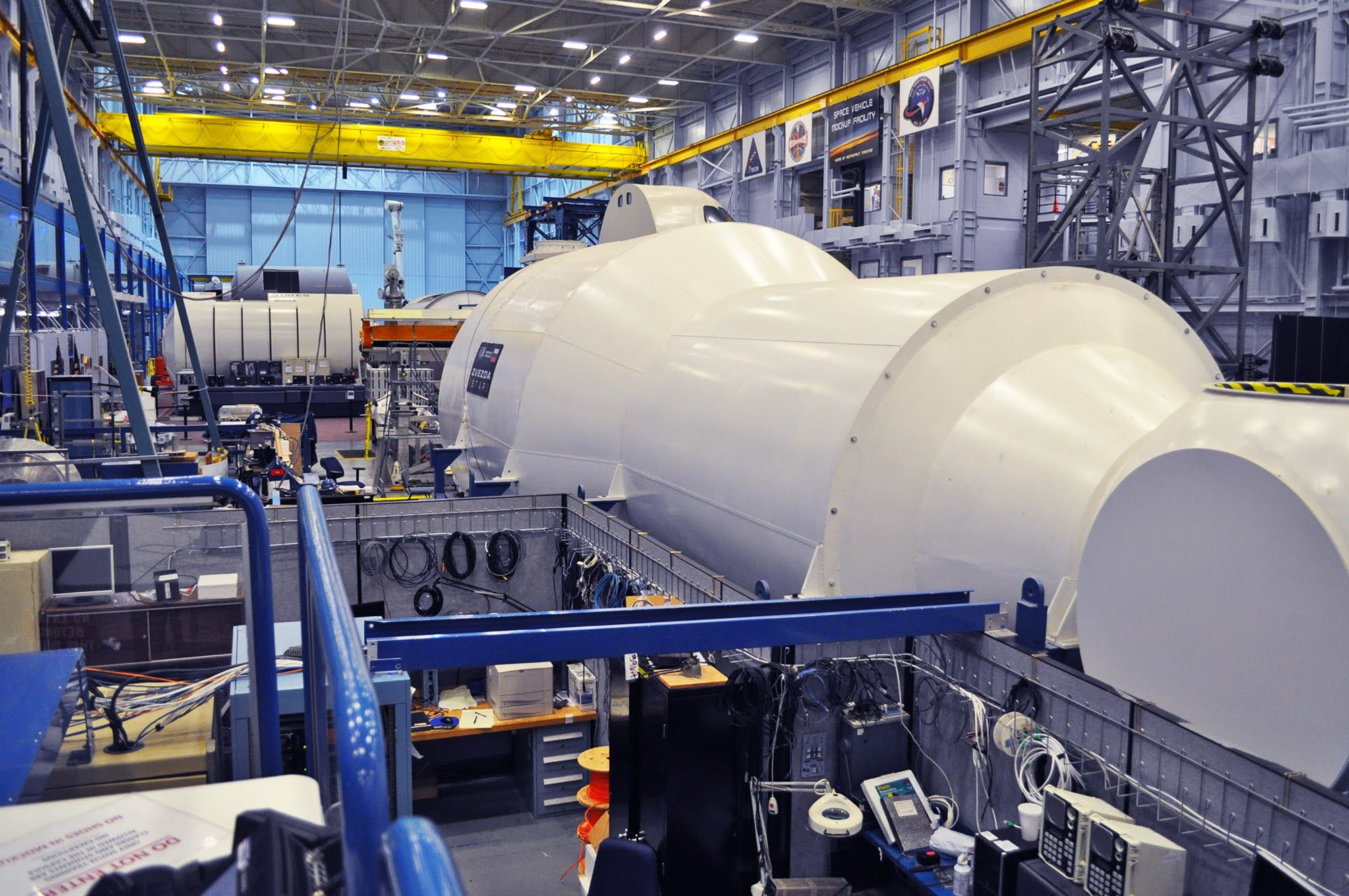
Zarya mockup

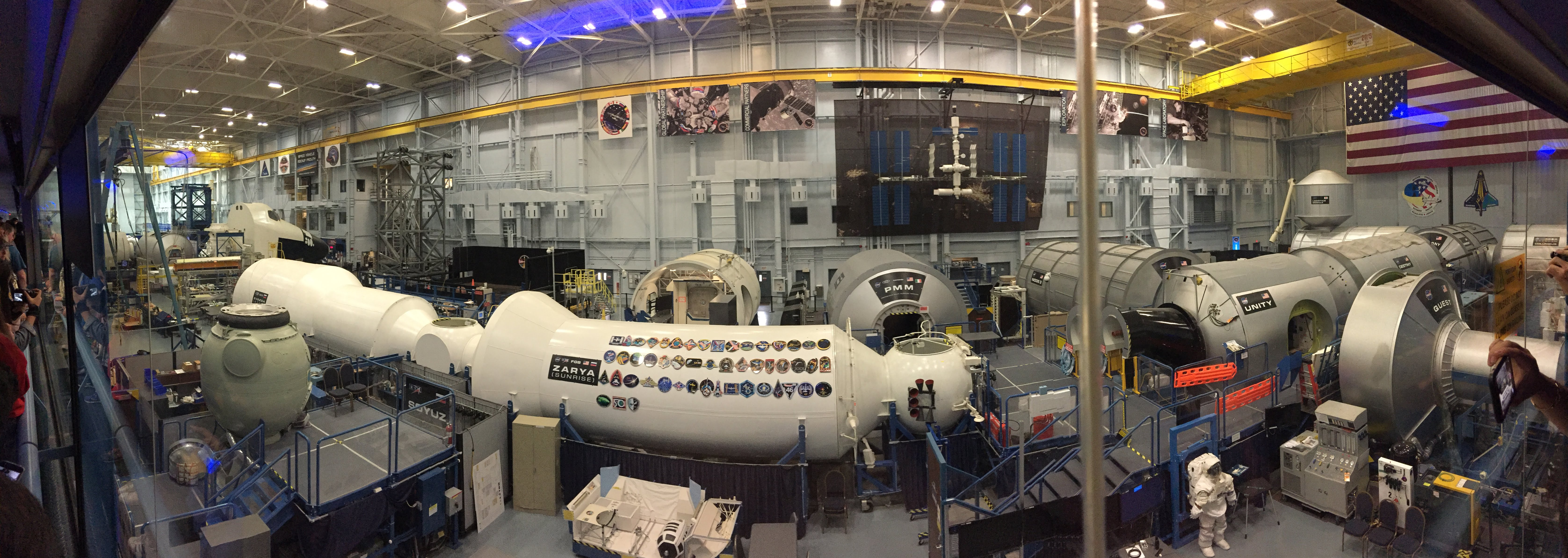
Panorama of the whole area

=== International Space Station Trainer ===
- Space Station Mockup and Training Facility (SSMTF)

=== Other facilities ===
- Precision Air Bearing Facility (PABF)
- Partial Gravity Simulator (POGO and ARGOS)
