= Envihab =

German medical research facility

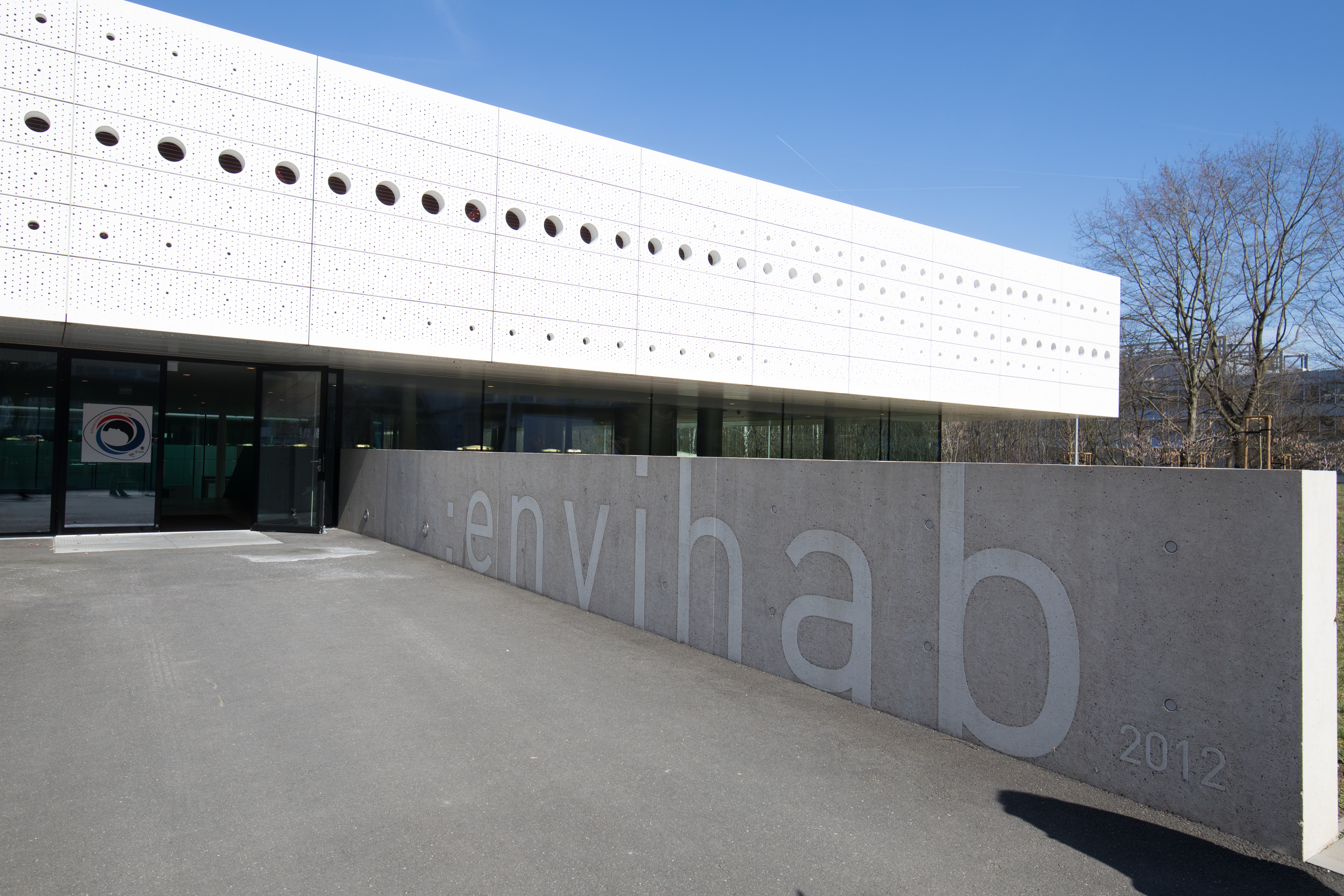
Entrance to envihab

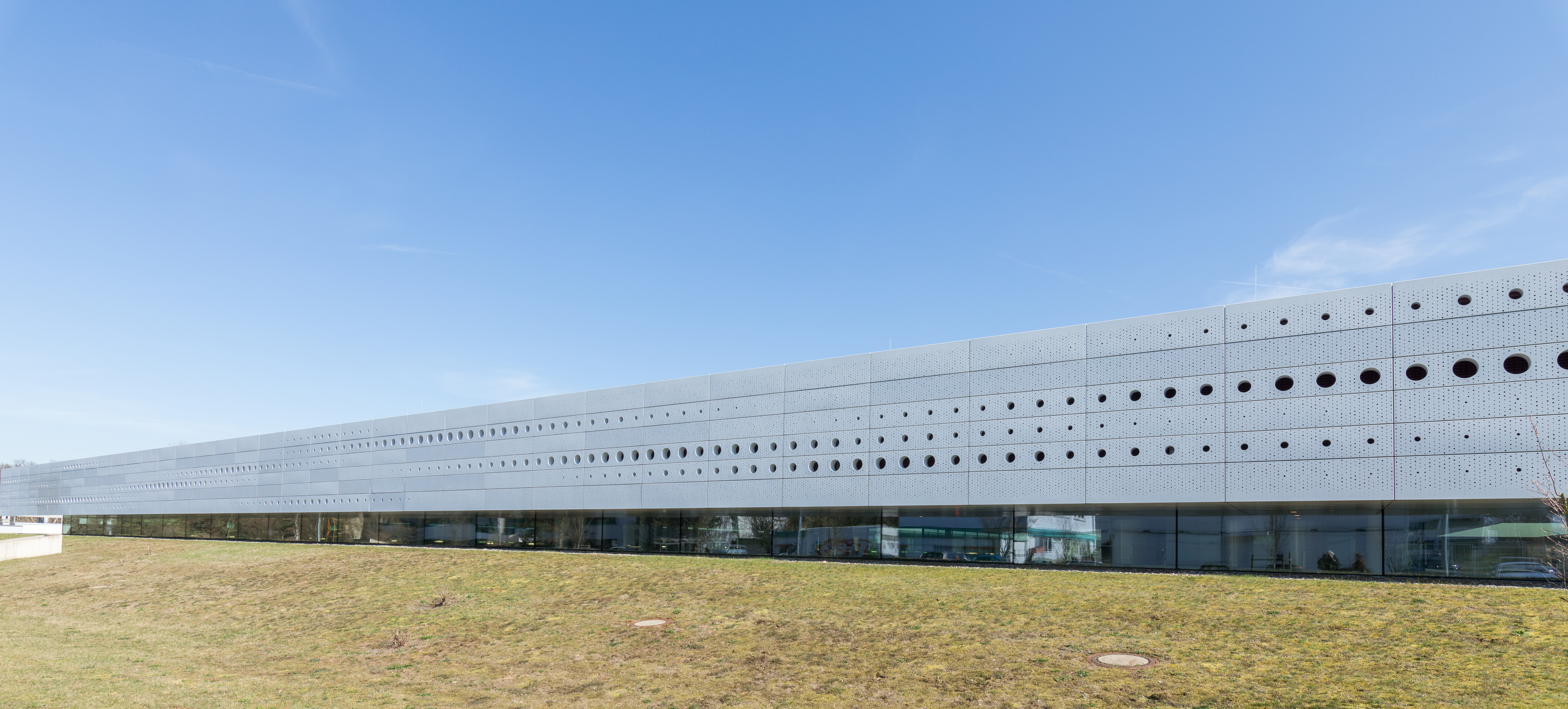
Side view of the building

Envihab is a medical research facility of the Institute of Aerospace Medicine of the German Aerospace Center (DLR) where the effects of diverse environmental conditions on humans are being analyzed and explored as well as possible countermeasures are being developed. The name Envihab is a combination of the words “environment” and “habitat” (Latin: home/living space). The concept of Envihab is to deal with complex problems of a life support system and the interaction between humans and the environment from a medical, biological and psychological point of view. Major focus will be put on research topics that deal with providing for health and performance of humans. The modular house-in-house concept makes it possible to use the different units and the technical equipment without leaving the building. 12 test persons can permanently be exposed to equal and controlled environmental conditions. Total floor space of :envihab is approx. 3.500 square meters.

== Modules ==
Video: human centrifuge

The 5 modules of Envihab are all linked with each other via the medical core area. They are lockable individually as well as in combination of different modules to control parameters like acoustics, climate (temperature, humidity, light), oxygen content and pressure. Test persons can be isolated, immobilized and purposely exposed to stress. In addition, psychological and physiological methods for rehabilitation and as countermeasures i.e. against the effects of immobilization/zero gravity will be analyzed. Envihab is designed to hold/house large training and simulation devices. Outstanding features will be the human centrifuge in the center of :envihab as well as areas where the amount of oxygen can be reduced and an area where pressure can be used to simulate altitudes of up to 5,500 meters.

=== EnviBio ===
The module EnviBio („Envihab – Biology“) provides a laboratory environment for microbiological research. The basic configuration and the steric features of the module support research up to safety class S2 (GenTSV) and under cleanroom conditions class 8. The three main topics investigated in EnviBio are

- Microbiological environment monitoring: analysis of the diversity of microbial burden and its evolution, also including the influence of humans
- Investigation on components of bioregenerative life support systems
- Development and preparation of biological space experiments

=== EnviFit ===
The sojourn of astronauts in space elicits substantial deconditioning effects within the cardiovascular system and equally great losses of bone and muscle mass. Astronauts share these problems with the older population, and especially with the bed-ridden and the immobilised. An aspect that becomes more important, in particular in the light of the demographic development in Germany. Even the young generation is affected. The incurring costs of akinesia and related disorders, such as osteoporosis, cardiovascular events, stroke and cancer are immense.

Hence, both the astronaut as well as immobilised and elderly people warrant the developing of efficient countermeasures. Accordingly, preventive interventions need to be identified in order mitigate or even prevent the negative side-effects of immobilisation.

EnviFit („Envihab – Fitness“) is an experimental station that is organized in different modules, and in which physiological alterations such as immobilisation and microgravity can be simulated. One way to do this is by 6° head-down-tilt bed-rest studies. Another method is the application of dry water immersion which means that the test persons float on a water-impermeable canvas cover and thus becomes ‘weightless’.

=== EnviMeet ===
EnviMeet is the area which will be accessible for the public. The visitors will be informed about the goals, projects and studies of Envihab as well as the functional elements in order to get an impression of the science.

=== EnviSim ===
EnviSim is a worldwide unique experimental station where it will be possible to simulate environmental conditions precisely. Thus, typical characteristics of diverse surroundings (cabin, space station, field hospital, etc.) will be generated realistically. On the one hand, analyses under uncommon and extreme conditions will be feasible, on the other hand, analyses on the human behaviour in defined and familiar environments will be far more economic, e.g. due to the abdication of flight tests. In addition, it will also be possible to modify single parameters of the surrounding explicitly so that the effect of a single factor as well as the interactions of multiple factors can be analysed regarding the impact on the human being.

EnviSim is planned to be a multi purpose area to explore diverse problems in the aerospace field. EnviSim is also planned to be a habitat making it possible for crews to live there for a longer period. For the exploration of long-term space missions a control center will be installed which simulates authentic flights and space stations. Following research topics will be part of EnviSim:

- Decision behaviour and performance in a team under work loading
- Modification of social structures under isolation
- Team formation and efficiency
- Impact of altered communicational opportunities on team work
- Test of digital expert systems for performance and social conflicts

=== EnviRec ===
Long-term habitation in artificial or isolated work environments entail the risk of a deprivation of impulses including fatal dangers for the human psychology and performance.

The main focus of EnviRec (“Envihab – Recreation”) is the exploration of diverse approaches of compensating the deprivation of impulses. Therefore, a presentation of authentic environmental effects will be created as a way for recovery for crew members. In touch with long-term studies of the EnviSim module and interdisciplinary research, the effects on crew members, team work and the supervision of the system as a whole will be quantified.

Following questions will be analysed in EnviRec:

- Test of virtual methods that support relieving stress
- Virtual reality and immersion
- Impact of virtual methods on performance and social behaviour

== Research ==
Envihab is designed for long-term medical habitat research which in general will strengthen Cologne and North Rhine-Westphalia as a location for aerospace business and science and will sharpen the profile of the DLR as a national and international research center of excellence in the field of aerospace medicine. Supported by the Regionale 2010 a research facility will be built that will supply scientific progress and economic surplus based on results that can be used by the industry. At the same time Envihab will increase the public's awareness for centralquestions of the future concerning life on Earth.

The new research facility of the DLR will create the basis for conducting integrative research in the field of life sciences on the highest international level.

Prior to conducting an experiment in orbit, the parameters of the project are being investigated on Earth. This applies to technical and material science experiments and is even more important when humans in space are involved or medical experiments are conducted.

In the future, the scientists of the Institute of Aerospace Medicine of the German Aerospace Center (DLR) will have a modern and ideal research facility customized to their needs at their disposal to conduct their studies: the Envihab.

== Architecture ==
Within the scope of the Regionale 2010, the architect's office Glass Kramer Löbbert won the pan-European architectural contest of the Envihab project at the German Aerospace Center (DLR) in Cologne/Germany.

The building consists of two levels: the user level which is located on the ground floor and the technical level housing the entire building supply units which is located on the second floor. The user level surrounding / grouped around the modules, the dividable auditorium and the exhibition hall /space will be accessible to the public.
