= Lunar Orbit and Landing Approach =

Facility at Langley Research Center

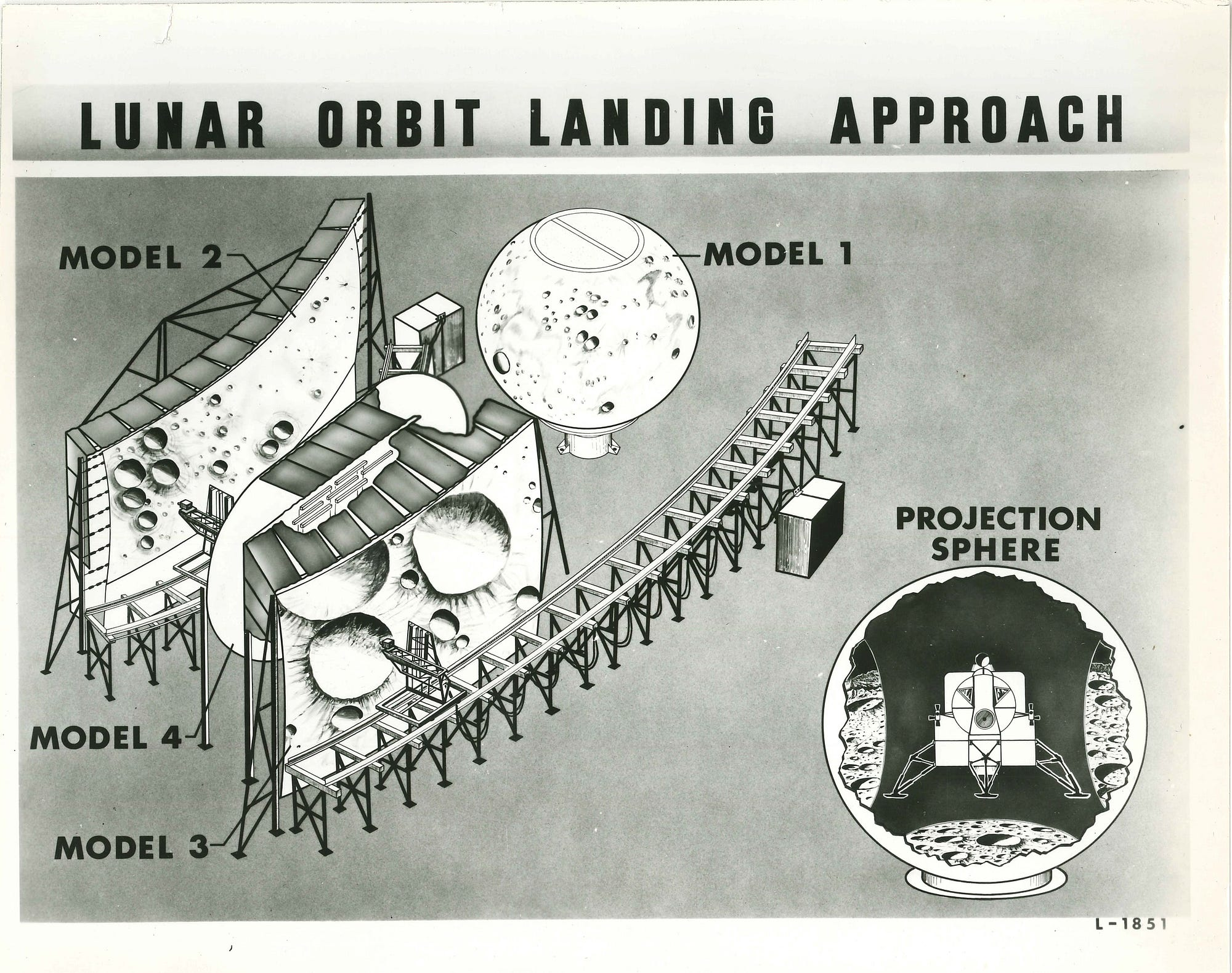
Project LOLA

Project LOLA, or Lunar Orbit and Landing Approach, was a simulator built at the NASA's Langley Research Center to study landing on the lunar surface. Built to aid the Apollo astronauts, it aimed to provide a detailed visual encounter with the Moon's landscape, costing nearly $2 million.

== Construction and design ==
The simulator's primary components included a cockpit, a closed-circuit television system, and four large-scale models depicting various altitudes of the lunar surface. Artists used paintbrushes and airbrushes to create the models. The four models created:

- A 6-meter diameter sphere that simulated the lunar surface seen from an altitude of 322 kilometers, with a scale of 1 centimeter per 5.7 kilometers
- Three smaller models, each approximately 4.5 meters by 12 meters in size; scaled sections of the large model
- A scaled-up section of the Crater Alphonsus, with a scale of 1 centimeter per 61 meters

The models were mounted on tracks to simulate the spacecraft's movement over the lunar surface. The pilot, positioned in the cockpit, could control the cameras moving along these tracks, switching between models to simulate the descent to the Moon.

Painting the Moon models

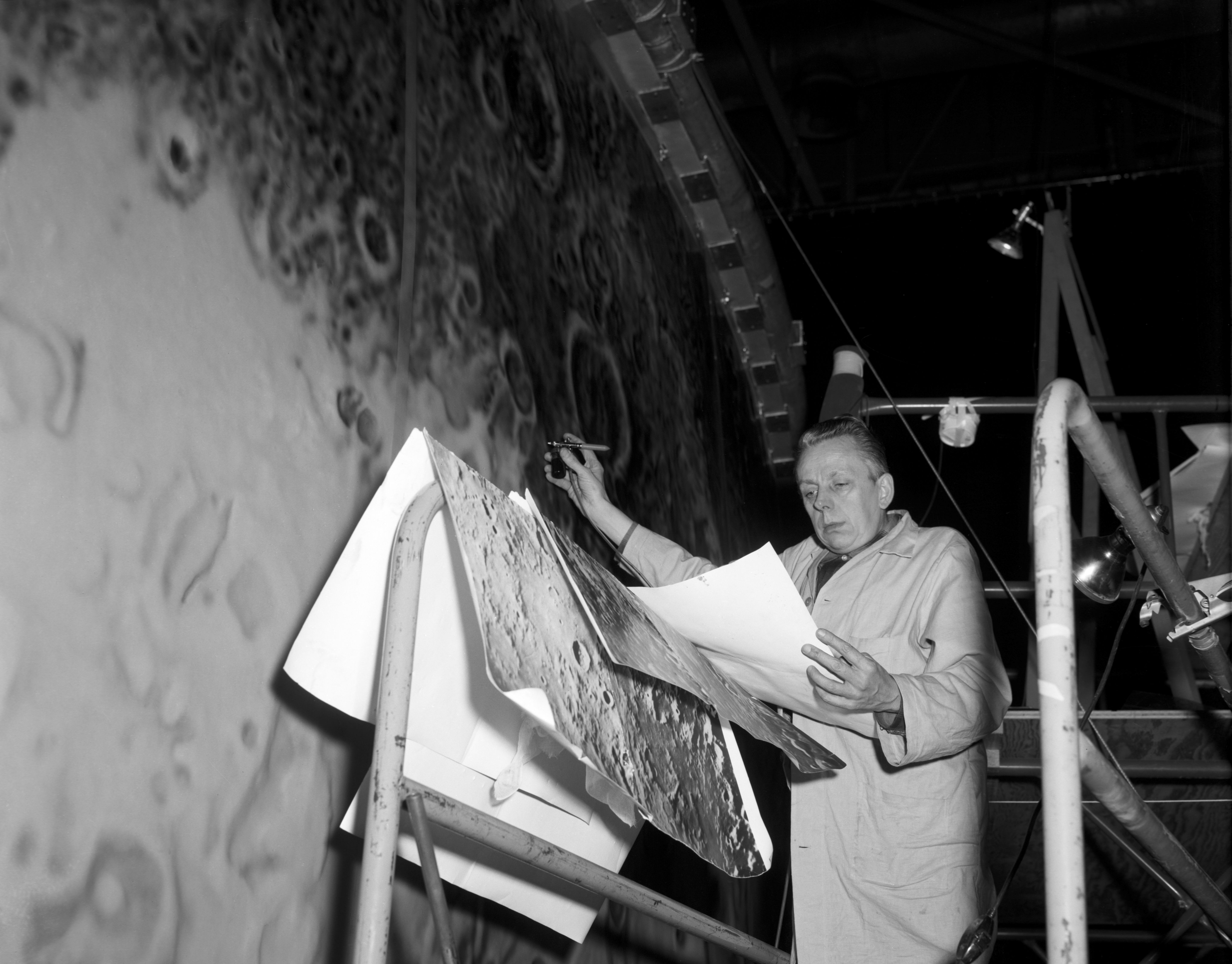

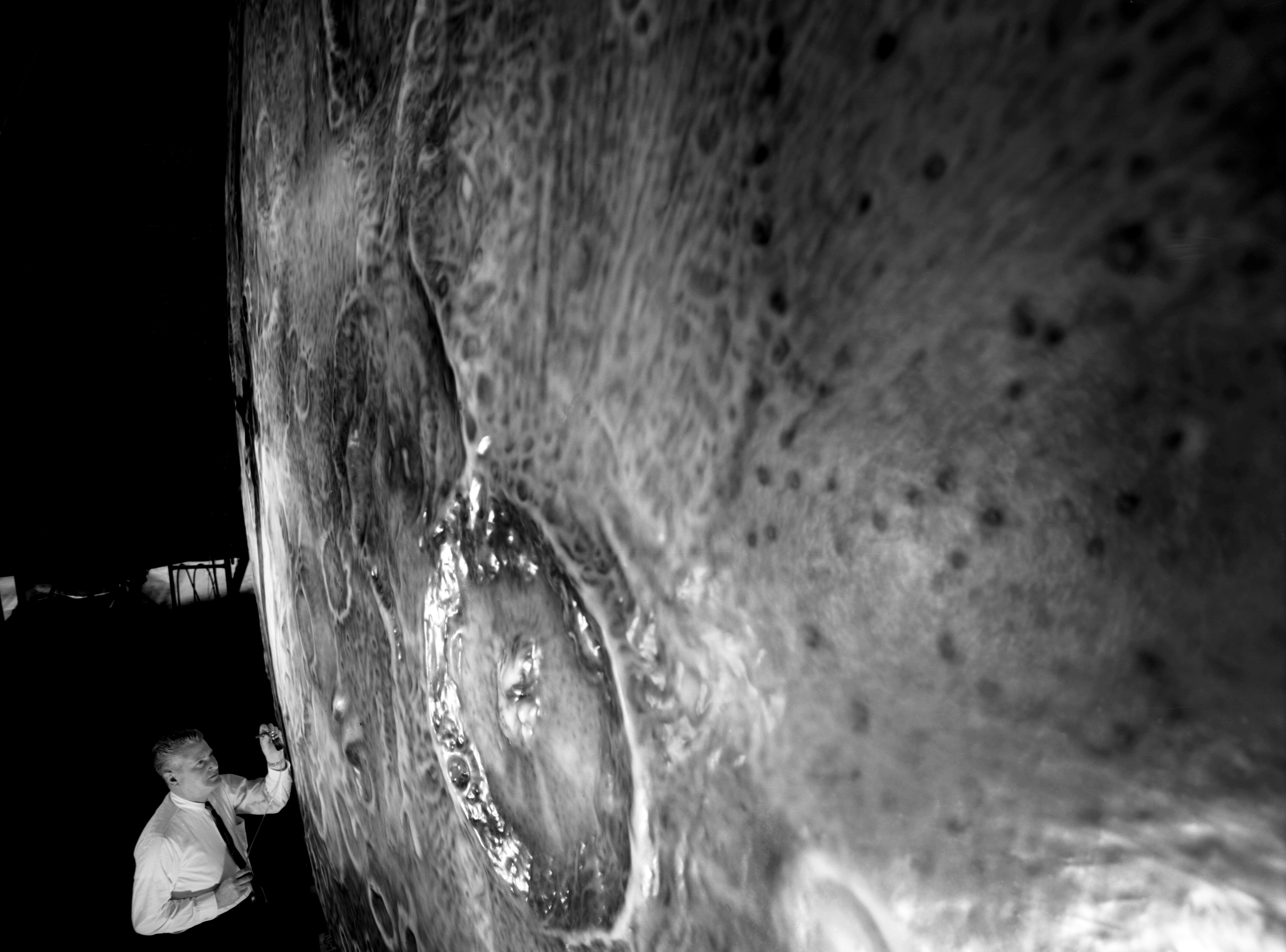

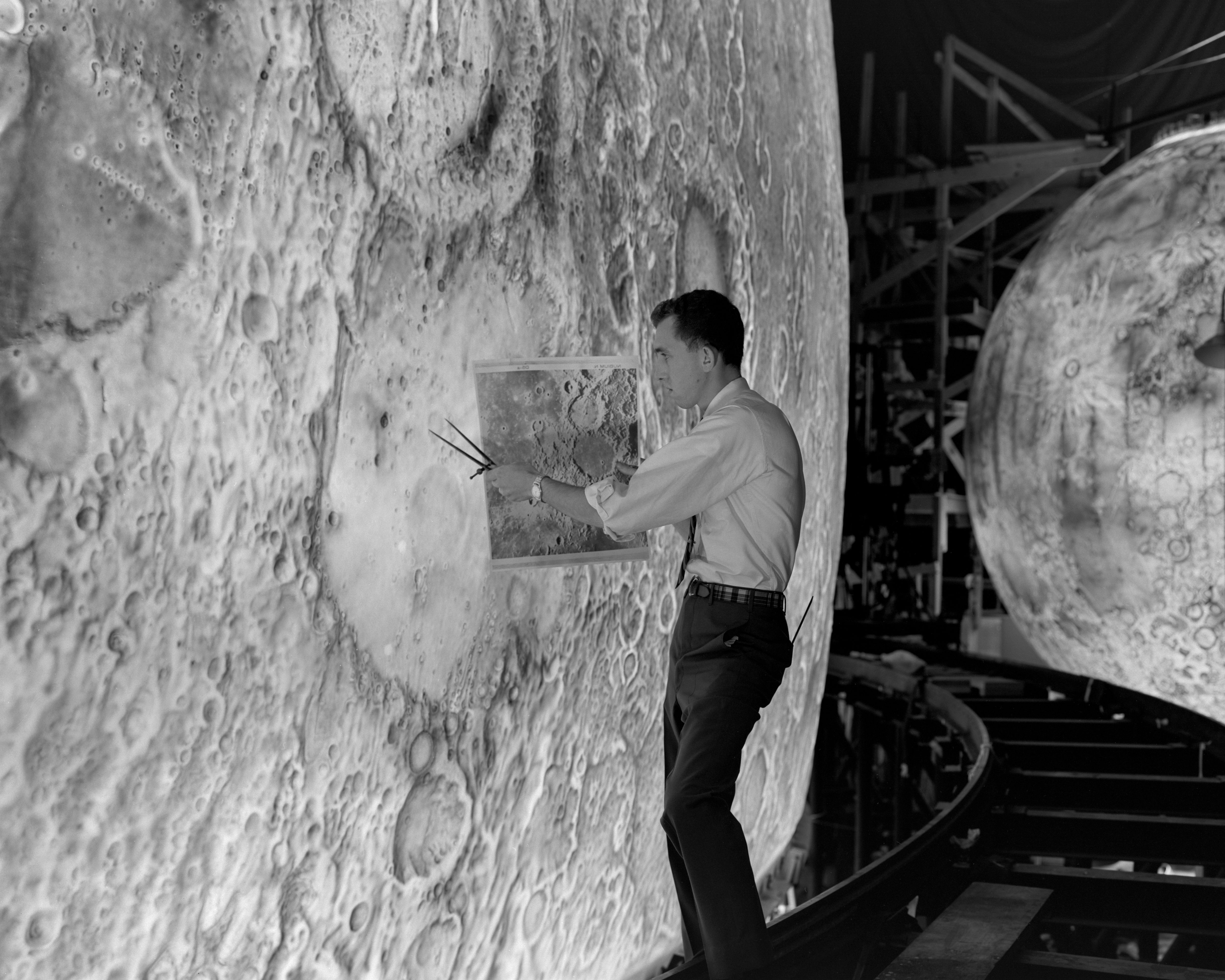

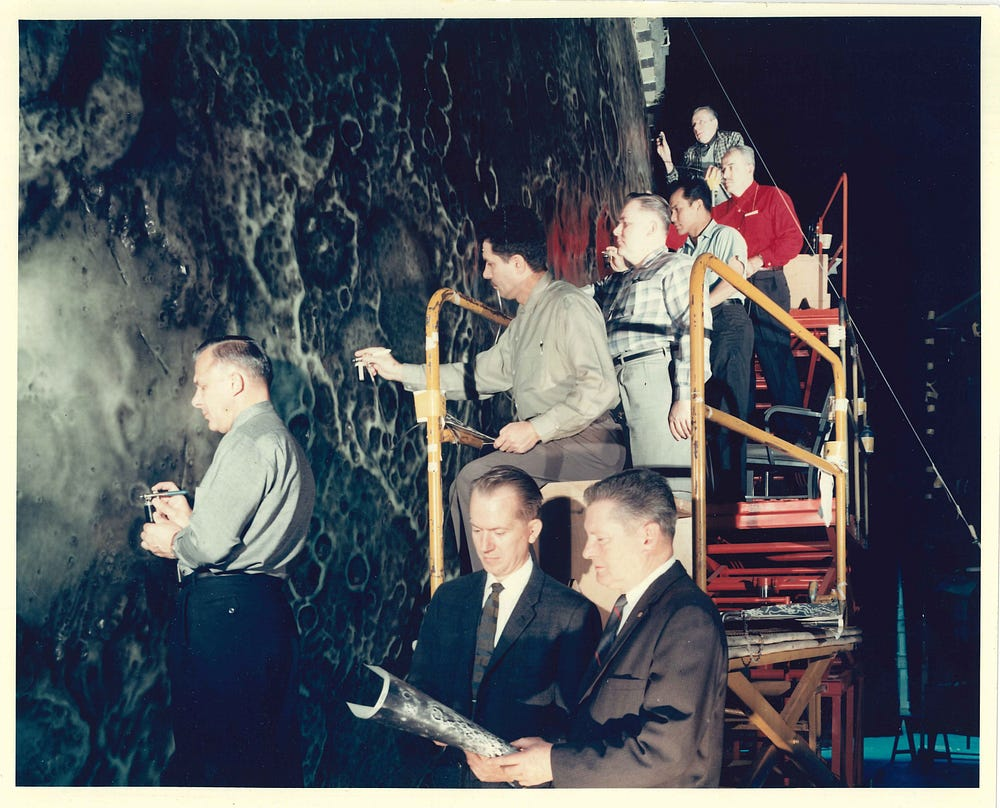

== Training ==
A training mission began with the pilot on Model 1, simulating the translunar approach and orbit establishment. As the descent progressed, the scene would switch to Model 2, and subsequently to Models 3. The simulation aimed to provide visual cues for controlling a spacecraft near the Moon. The lunar module cabin offered a 45-degree field of view through its windows, while the simulator's projection screens provided a broader 65-degree field of view. Four Schmidt television projectors rear-projected the lunar surface, while a starfield generator, mounted above the cabin, front-projected the stars.

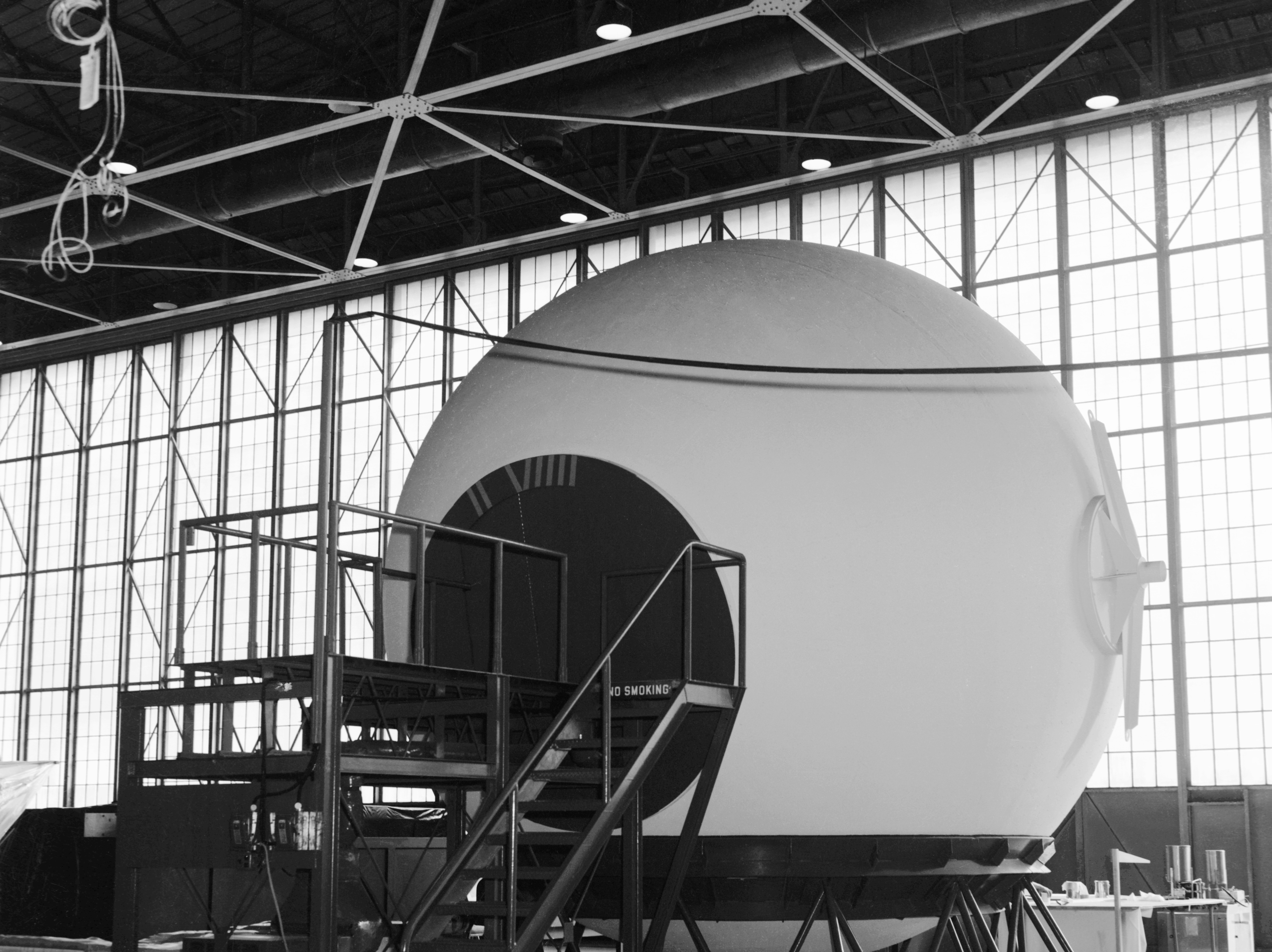
Construction of Model 1 used in the LOLA simulator.

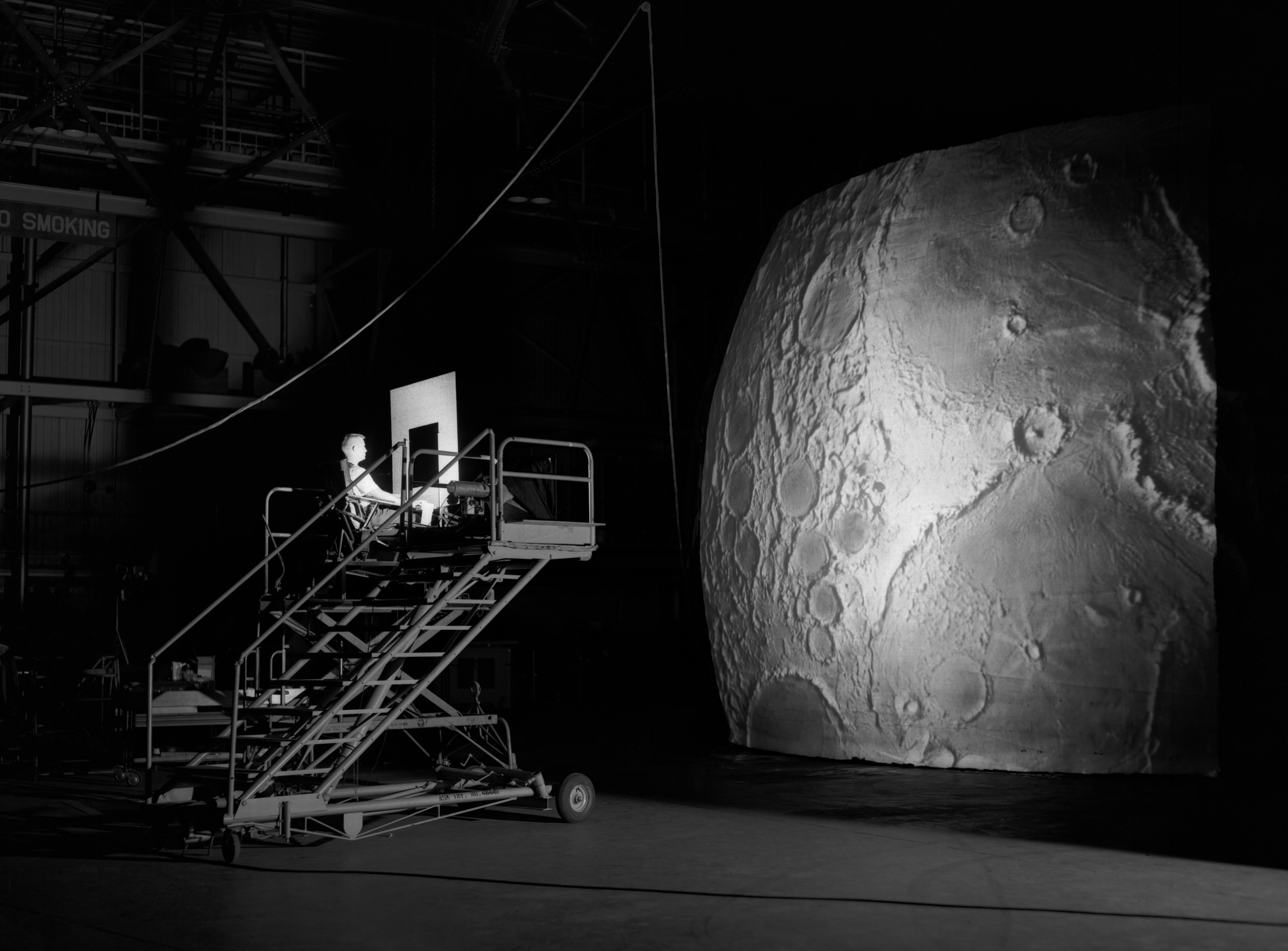
Test subject at controls of the simulator

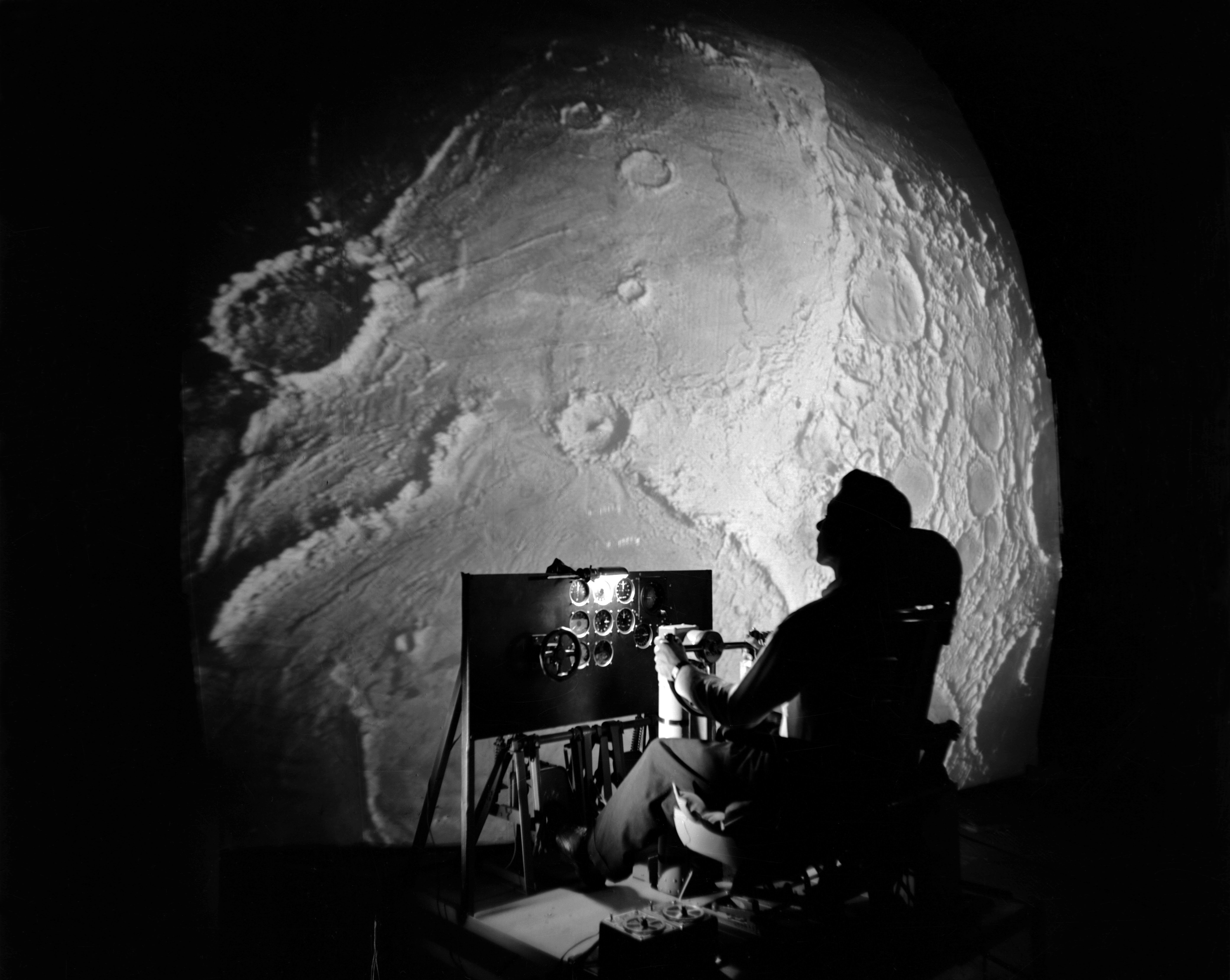
Test subject during the training session

== Evaluation and decommissioning ==
Project LOLA was deemed impractical for the actual flight in lunar orbit, as it did not simulate the rendezvous with the Lunar Excursion Module (LEM). The simulator was used by Apollo astronauts starting in 1964, but after Apollo 11 it became evident that the simulator was not necessary. Project LOLA was decommissioned shortly after the end of the Apollo missions and was completely dismantled by 1978.

According to the NASA statement from 1964, "LOLA was not built as a training device for astronauts but as 'a research tool with which NASA scientists can establish a fundamental understanding in the laboratory of the problems associated with the complex task of approaching the Moon and preparing for a landing on its surface.'"

== See also ==
- Reduced Gravity Walking Simulator
- Lunar Landing Research Facility
