= Reduced Gravity Walking Simulator =

NASA training and research facility

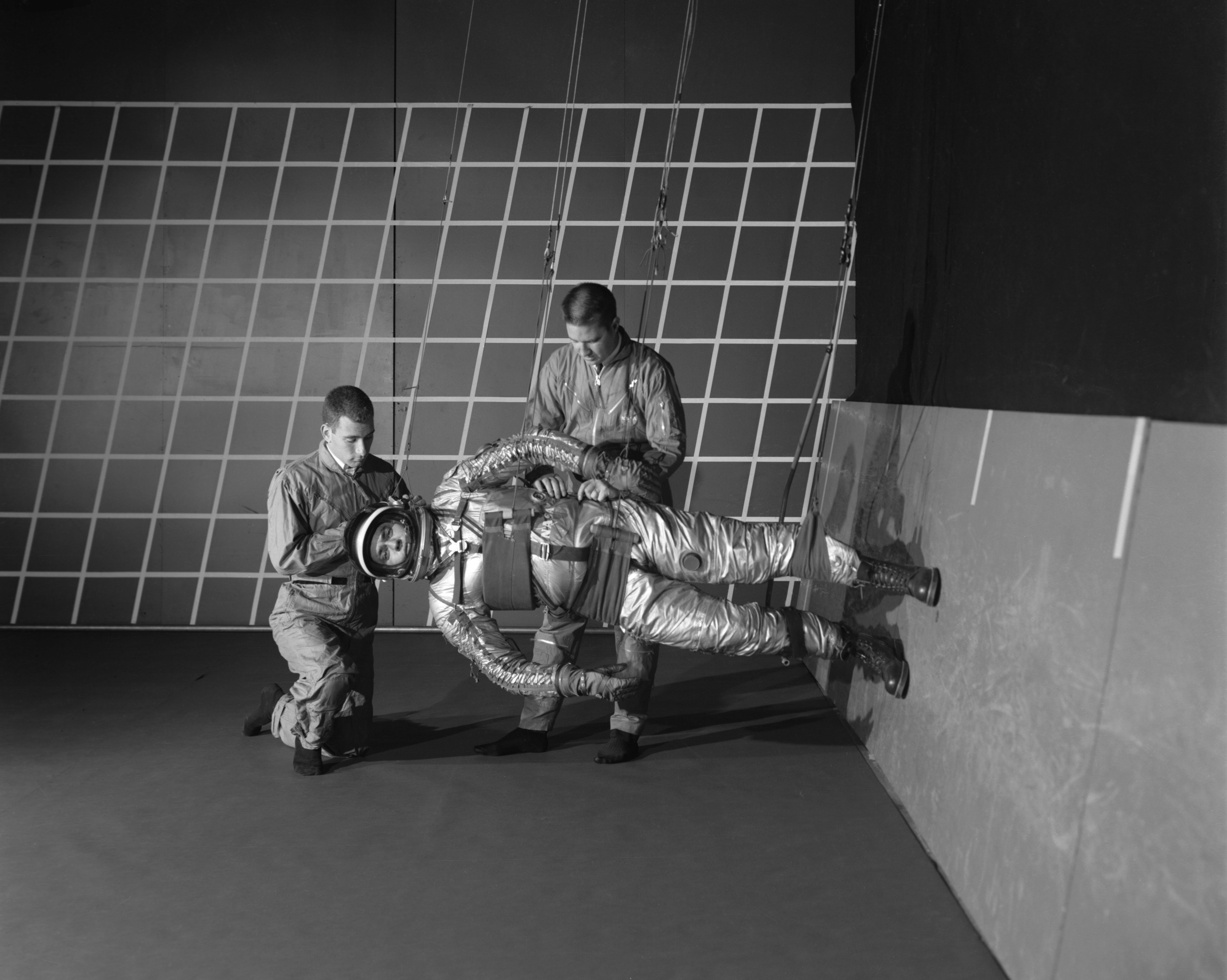
Astronaut training in the Reduced Gravity Walking Simulator located in the hangar at Langley Research Center. This position meant that a person's legs experienced only one sixth of their weight, which was the equivalent of being on the lunar surface.

The Reduced Gravity Walking Simulator, or Lunar Landing Walking Simulator, was a facility developed by NASA in the early 1960s to study human locomotion under simulated lunar gravity conditions. Located at NASA's Langley Research Center in Virginia, it was designed to prepare astronauts for the Moon landing during the Apollo program.

== Design and operation ==
A reduced gravity simulator was needed to prepare astronauts for the Moon landing. It was proposed by the NASA engineer William Hewitt Phillips. The simulator was a part of the Lunar Landing Research Facility (LLRF) and was completed in 1965. In 1972, the LLRF was redesigned into the Impact Dynamics Research Facility.

The simulator was made of "canvas slings, steel cables, a small trolley, and a wooden walking surface". The simulator consisted of an inclined walkway tilted at a 9.5° angle from vertical. Test subjects were suspended on their side via cables attached to different parts of their body, "a puppet-type suspension system at the end of a long pendulum", and were inclined on their side at the same 9.5° angle. This arrangement allowed them to walk along the inclined surface while experiencing only one-sixth (17%) of Earth's gravity — equivalent to the Moon's gravitational pull. The remaining weight was supported by the suspension system. The suspension system used multiple cables connected to an overhead monorail trolley that moved parallel to the walkway. This setup permitted subjects to walk, run, jump and perform other locomotive activities along the length of the walkway. However, lateral and rotational movements were restricted.

According to Francis B. Smith, during the training, the suspended astronaut feels "approximately 1/6 of the earth's normal gravity field ... a 180 pound astronaut "standing" on the platform would exert a force of only 30 pounds — the same as if he were standing upright on the lunar surface".

Scientists used the simulator to analyze the physiological effects of reduced gravity on various forms of locomotion: walking, jumping, and running; fatigue limit, energy expenditure, and speed of locomotion were also studied and measured.

Subjects wore pressurized spacesuits during some tests to more closely replicate lunar surface conditions. All three astronauts of the Apollo 1 trained there; in total, 24 astronauts used the simulator to train for the lunar missions. The simulator became popular among journalists. In 1968, Walter Cronkite of CBS tried it himself for a "rather comical televised walk on the moon".

== Gallery ==
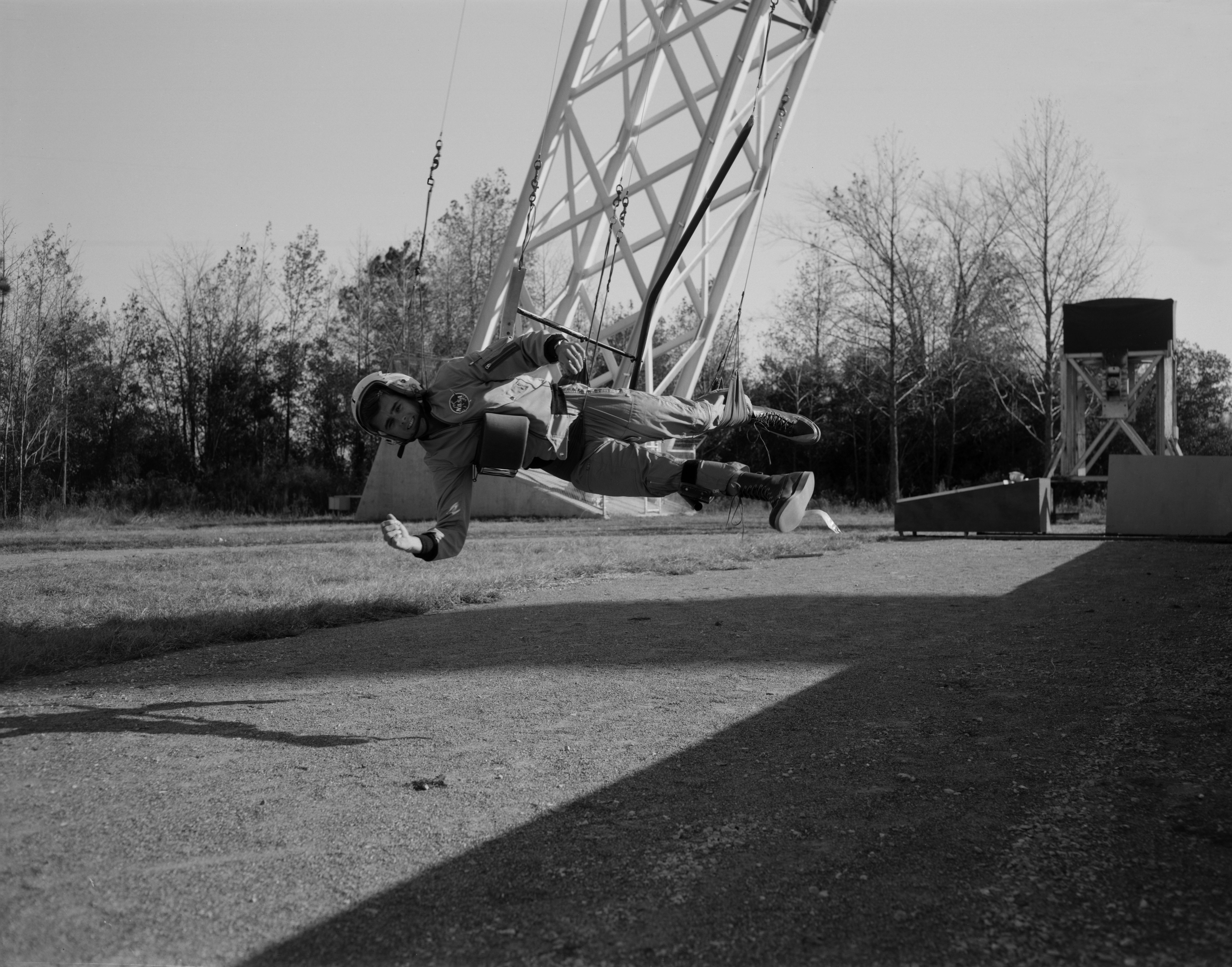
Apollo 1 astronaut Roger Chaffee training at the Reduced Gravity Simulator

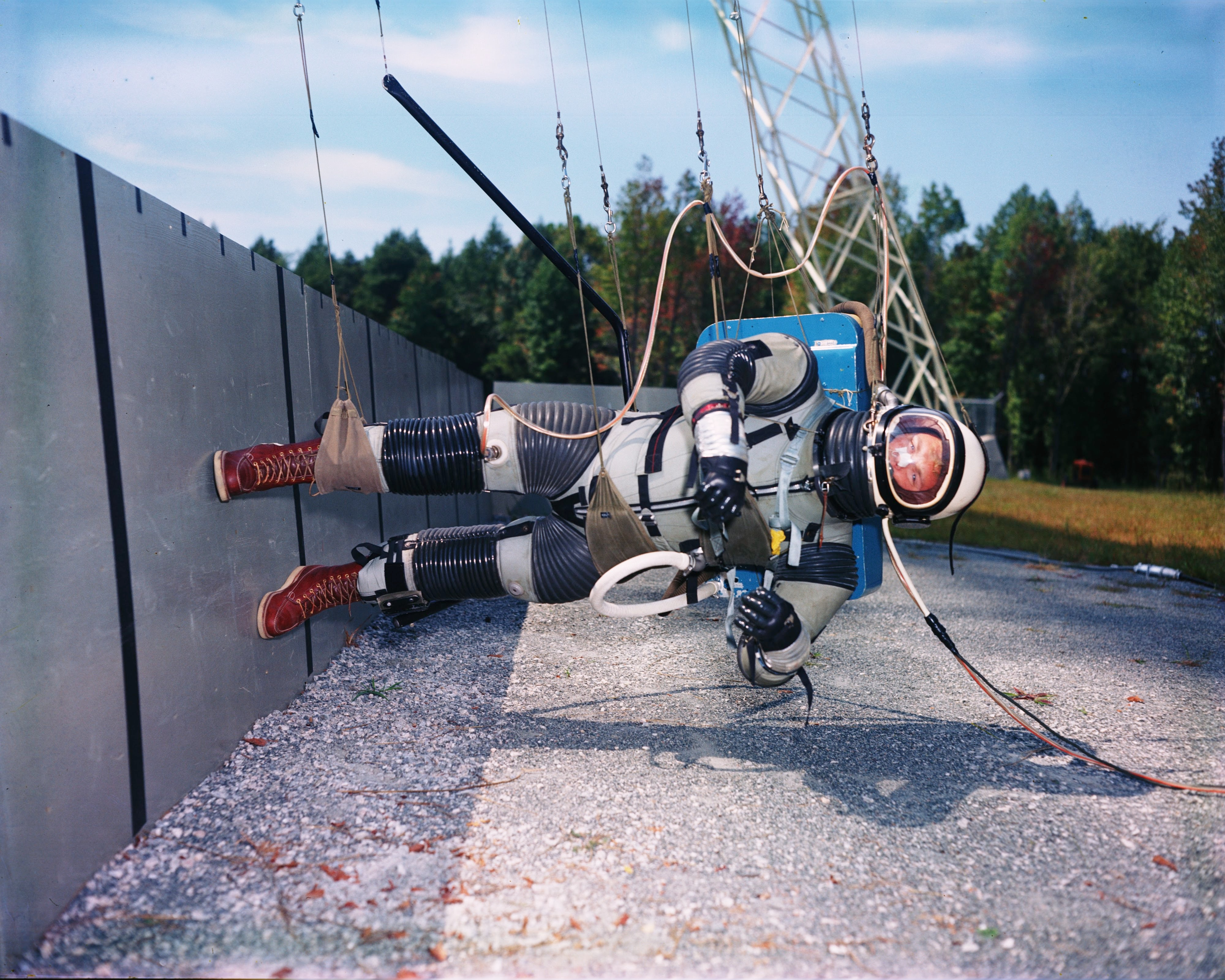
Astronaut training at the Reduced Gravity Simulator in the pressurized spacesuit

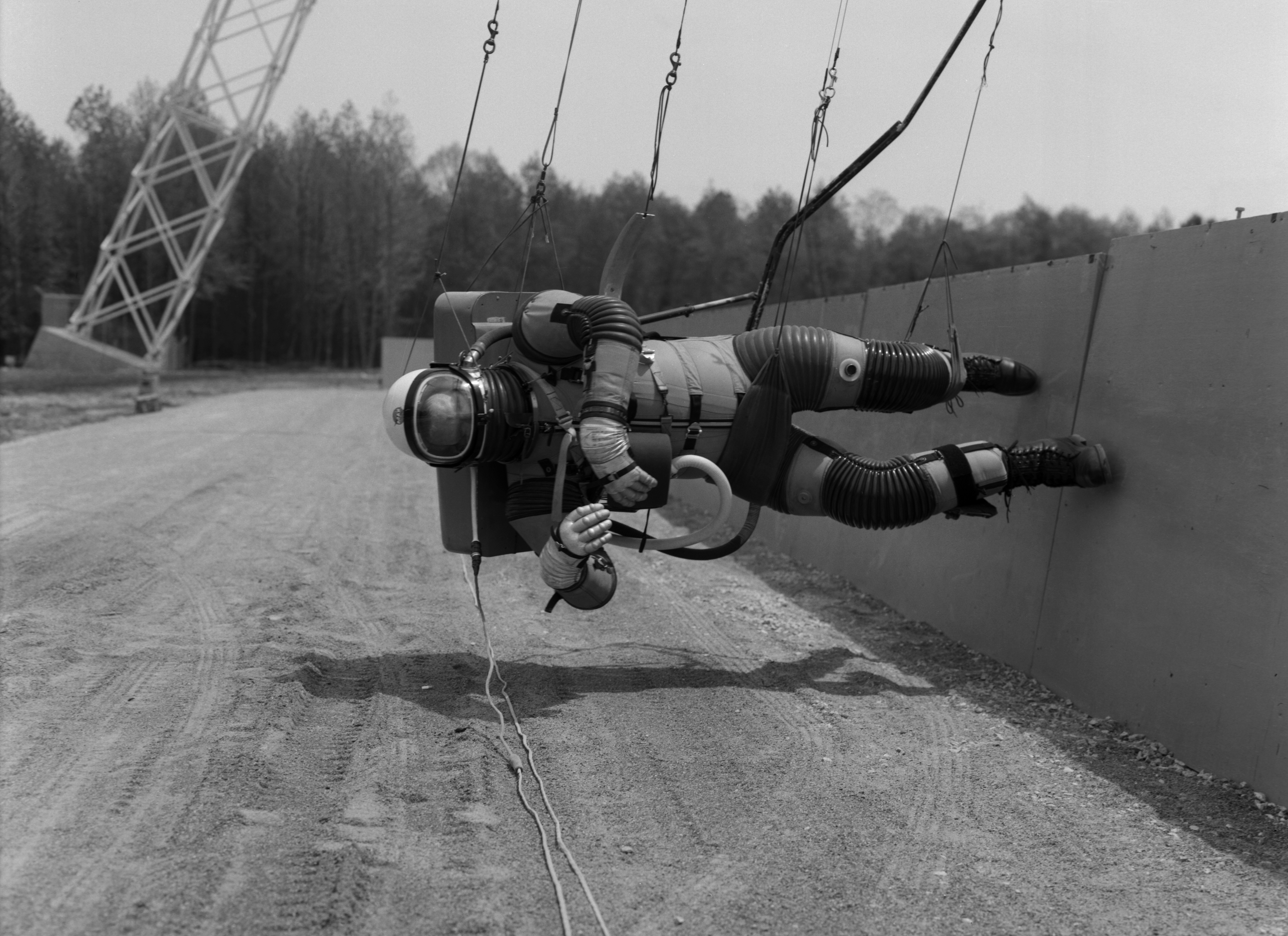
Astronaut in the pressurized spacesuit

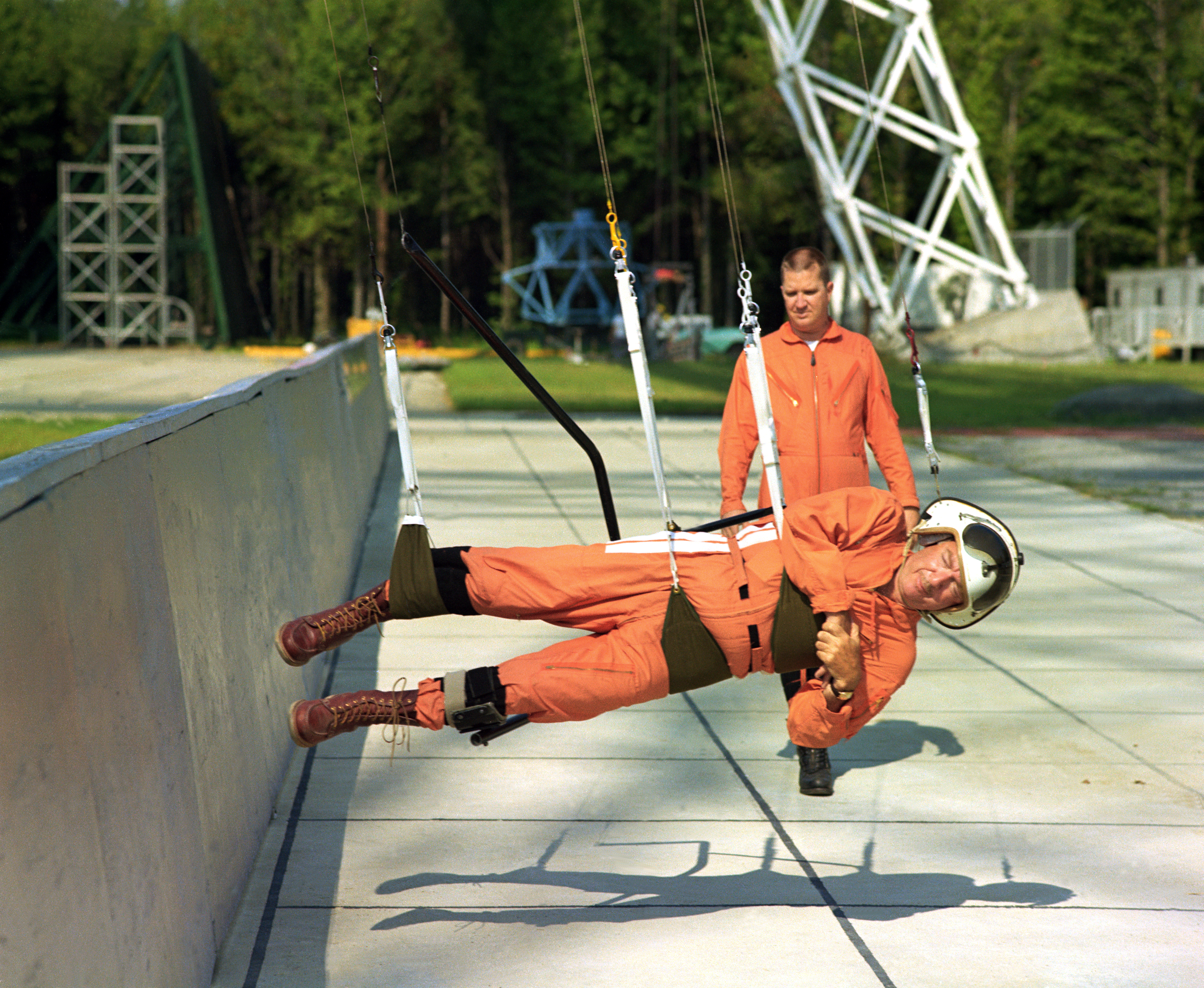
Journalist Walter Cronkite at the simulator

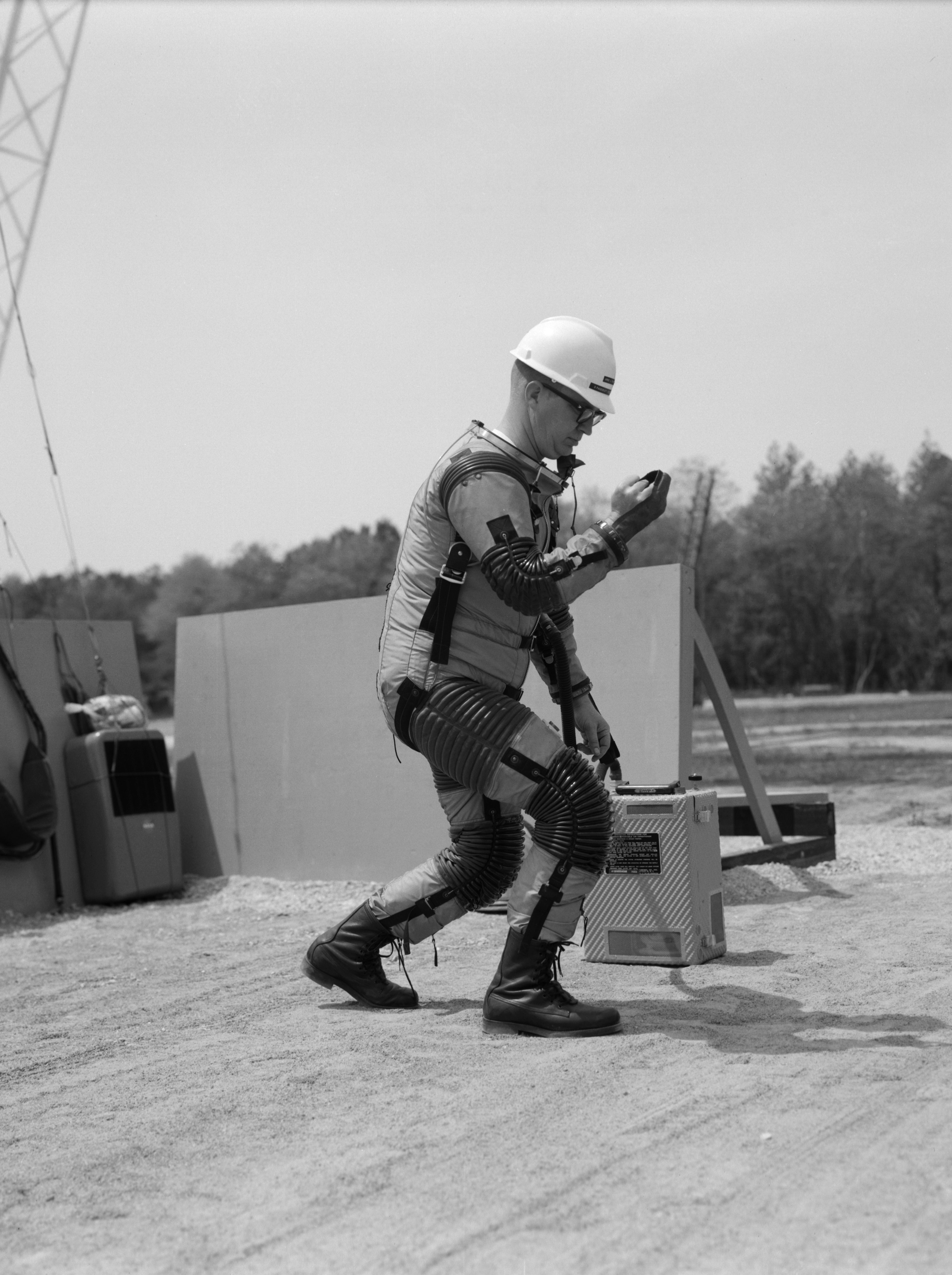
Special "space" suit for the Reduced Gravity Walking Simulator

== See also ==
- Lunar Orbit and Landing Approach
