= Lunar Landing Research Facility =

Facility at Langley Research Center

- U.S. National Register of Historic Places
- U.S. National Historic Landmark
- Virginia Landmarks Register
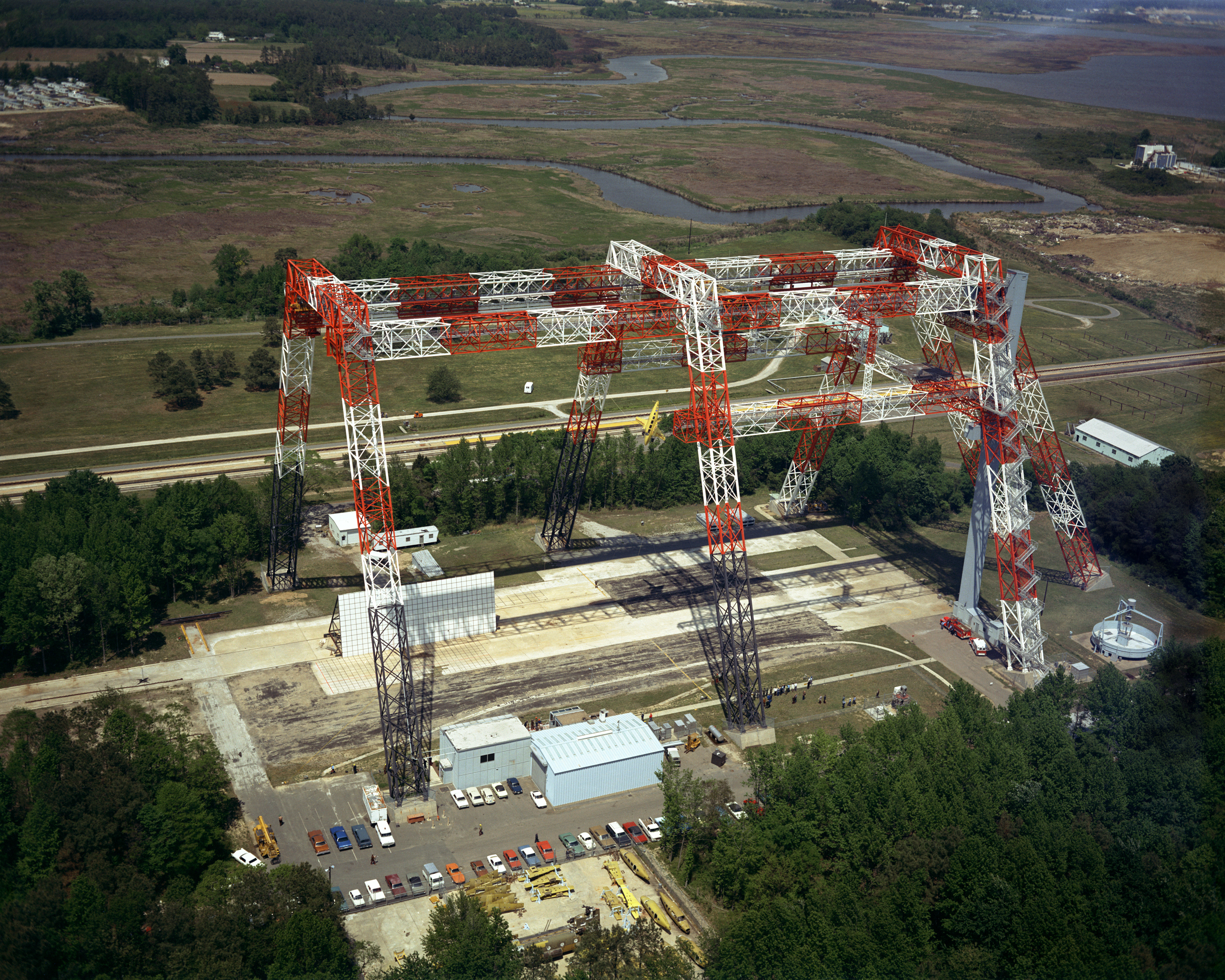
- The site as the Impact Dynamics Research Facility (1974)

- Location within Virginia Location within the United States
- Location: Hampton, Virginia
- Coordinates: 37°6′8″N 76°23′23″W
- Built: 1965
- Architect: NASA
- NRHP reference No.: 85002808
- VLR No.: 114-0140

Significant dates
- Added to NRHP: October 3, 1985
- Designated NHL: October 3, 1985
- Designated VLR: February 18, 1986

The Lunar Landing Research Facility (LLRF) was an area at NASA's Langley Research Center in Hampton, Virginia that was used to simulate Apollo Moon landings with a mock Lunar Module powered by a small rocket motor suspended from a crane over a simulated lunar landscape.

Completed in 1965 at a cost of $3.5 million, the facility was used by 24 astronauts, including Neil Armstrong and Buzz Aldrin, to practice solving piloting problems they would encounter in the last 150 feet (46 m) of descent to the surface of the Moon.

The structure was used to facilitate "flying" a full-scale Lunar Excursion Module Simulator (LEMS). The LEMS was suspended from a 200-foot (61 m)-tall, 400-foot (120 m)-long A-frame gantry by an overhead bridge crane. The LEMS is now on display at the Virginia Air and Space Center.

== Post-Apollo uses ==
Re-designated the Impact Dynamics Research Facility (IDRF) in 1974, the site was used for research on aircraft crashes until 2003. With limited funding for maintenance, NASA then closed the facility and it was listed for demolition.

In 2004, NASA determined that the IDRF could be adapted to support the Constellation program. It was re-opened in 2005 to conduct landing tests associated with the development of the Crew Exploration Vehicle (CEV) Orion. The facility was renamed the Landing and Impact Research Facility (LandIR) and minor modifications were made, including a new parallel winch system to support full-scale Orion testing and a new hydro-impact basin (splashdown pool) below the gantry. Construction of the basin was completed in 2011. After Constellation was cancelled, the LandIR continued performing impact testing since the CEV will be used to service the International Space Station.

The facility was designated a National Historic Landmark in 1985 for its role in the space program.

== Gallery ==
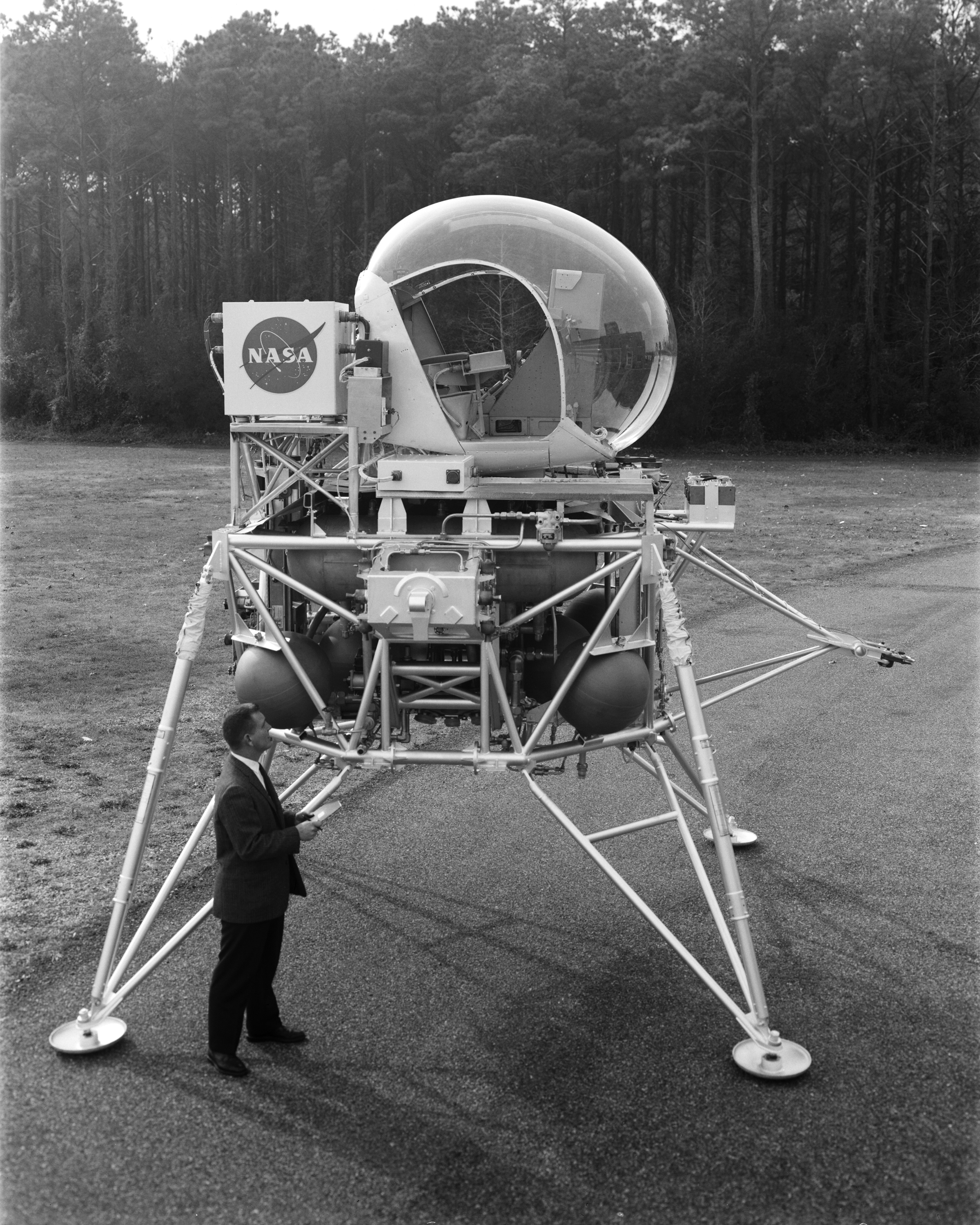
Vehicle for Lunar Landing Research Facility at Langley Research Center

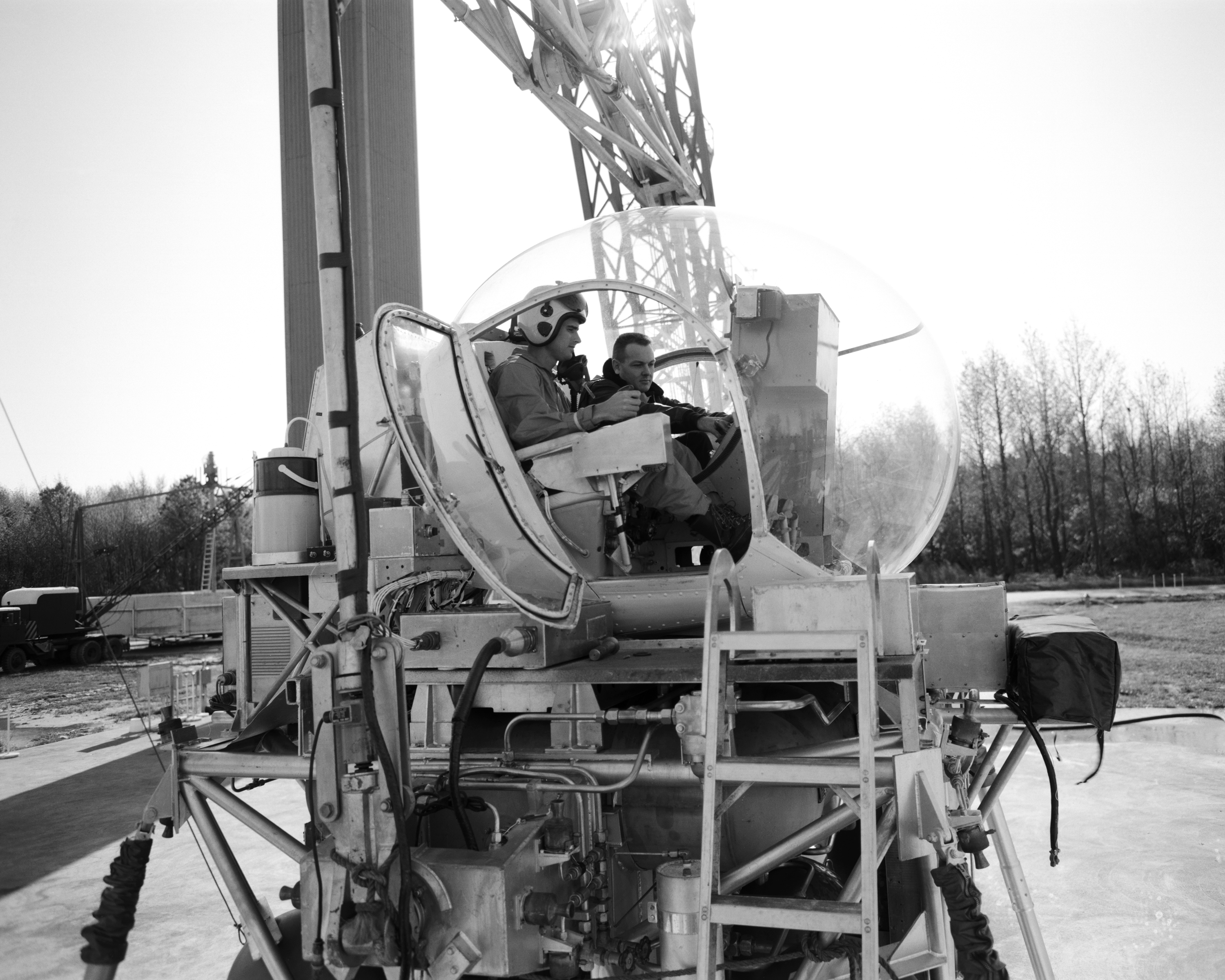
Astronaut Roger B. Chaffee (left) receives instruction from Maxwell W. Goode, a scientist at NASA's Langley Research Center

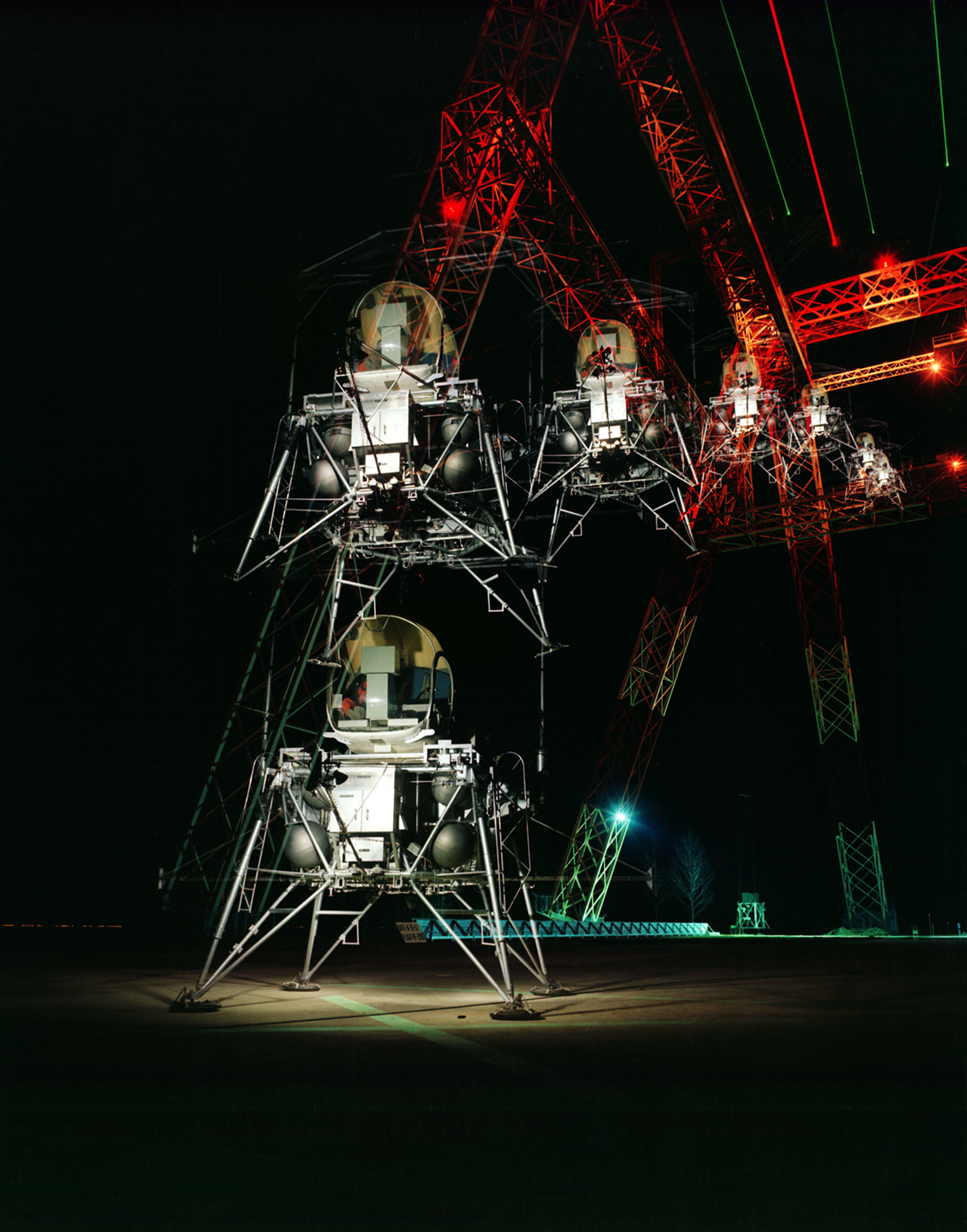
This multiple exposure shows a simulated Moon landing of the Lunar Lander trainer

== See also ==
- Reduced Gravity Walking Simulator, part of the LLRF
- Lunar Orbit and Landing Approach
- Lunar Landing Research Vehicle
- List of National Historic Landmarks in Virginia
- National Register of Historic Places listings in Hampton, Virginia
